= List of rulers of Saxony =

Monarchy of Saxony
- Royal coat of arms

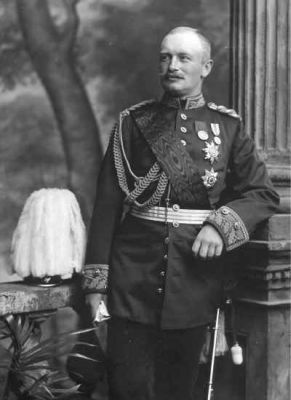
- Frederick Augustus III

Details
- Style: His Majesty
- First monarch: Hadugato
- Last monarch: Frederick Augustus III
- Formed: 531
- Abolished: 13 November 1918
- Appointer: Hereditary
- Pretenders: Disputed: Daniel, Margrave of Meissen or Prince Alexander

This article lists dukes, electors, and kings ruling over different territories named Saxony from the beginning of the Saxon Duchy in the 6th century to the end of the German monarchies in 1918.

The electors of Saxony from John the Steadfast onwards were Lutheran until Augustus II of Saxony converted to Catholicism in order to be elected King of Poland and Grand Duke of Lithuania. His descendants (including all Kings of Saxony) have since been Catholic.

== Old Saxony ==
The old Saxon coats of arms today lives on in the coats of arms of Lower Saxony and Westphalia.

The original Duchy of Saxony comprised the lands of the Saxons in the north-western part of present-day Germany, namely, the contemporary German state of Lower Saxony as well as Westphalia and Western Saxony-Anhalt, not corresponding to the modern German state of Saxony.

Frankish king Charlemagne conquered Saxony and integrated it into the Carolingian Empire. In the later 9th century, power began to shift from the (Eastern) Frankish king to the local Saxon rulers, resulting in the emergence of the Younger stem duchy.

=== Independent Saxony ===
- Hadugato (fl. c. 531)
- Berthoald (fl. c. 622)
- Theoderic (fl. c. 743–744)
- Widukind (c. 777–785), leader against Charlemagne
- Albion (fl. c. 785–811)

=== Saxony as part of Frankish kingdom(s) ===
Dukes of Saxony
Image	Name	Reign	Notes
Hattonid Dynasty
	Banzleib	838 – 840	Comes et marchio
Liudolfing/Ottonian Dynasty
	Liudolf I	850 – 12 March 864 or 866	Comes et marchio
	Bruno	12 March 864 or 866 – 2 February 880	Comes et marchio
	Otto I the Illustrious	2 February 880 – 30 November 912	First duke of the Younger stem duchy
	Henry I the Fowler	30 November 912 – 2 July 936	King 919–936
	Otto II the Great	2 July 936 – 961	King 936–973, emperor 962–973
Billung Dynasty
	Hermann	961 – 27 March 973	
	Bernard I	27 March 973 – 9 February 1011	
	Bernard II	9 February 1011 – 29 June 1059	
	Ordulf	29 June 1059 – 28 March 1072	
	Magnus	28 March 1072 – 23 August 1106	
Supplinburg Dynasty
	Lothar	1106 – 4 December 1137	King 1125–1137, emperor 1133–1137
Ascanian Dynasty
	Otto the Rich	1112	Appointed by Emperor Henry V in opposition to Duke Lothar. Otto was the son-in-law of Duke Magnus Billung and the father of later Duke, Albert the Bear.
House of Mansfeld
	Hoyer I, Count of Mansfeld	1115	Appointed by Emperor Henry V in opposition to Duke Lothar.
Welf Dynasty
	Henry the Proud	4 December 1137 – 20 October 1139	Son-in-law of Lothar; also duke of Bavaria
Ascanian Dynasty
	Albert the Bear	20 October 1139 – 1142	Son of Otto the Rich and grandson of Magnus Billung; also Margrave of Brandenburg
Welf Dynasty
	Henry the Lion	1142–1180	son of Henry the Proud and grandson of Lothair III; also Duke of Bavaria

With the removal of the Welfs in 1180, the Duchy of Saxony was sharply reduced in territory. Westphalia fell to the archbishop of Cologne, while the Duchy of Brunswick remained with the Welfs. The Ascanian dukes had their base further east, near the Elbe, in what is sometimes called the younger Duchy of Saxony, resulting in the name Saxony moving towards the east. After the division, the counting of the dukes started anew. Though the first Ascanian duke is competingly counted as Bernard III (because of two predecessors of the same name before 1180) or as Bernard I, his successor, Albert I is already usually counted as the first, although before 1180 he had one predecessor of the same name, Albert the Bear.

In the 10th century Emperor Otto I had created the County Palatine of Saxony in the Saale-Unstrut area of southern Saxony. The honour was initially held by a Count of Hessengau, then from the early 11th century by the Counts of Goseck, later by the counts of Sommerschenburg, and still later by the landgraves of Thuringia. When the Wettin landgraves succeeded to the Electorate of Saxony, the two positions merged.

== The Younger Saxony: The Duchy and the Electorate ==
Coat of arms of Saxony used since the accession of the House of Ascania to the dukedom in 1180, comprising the Ascanian arms with an added bendwise crancelin indicating the Saxon ducal rank

The new dukes replaced the Saxon horse emblem and introduced their Ascanian family colours and emblem added by a bendwise crancelin, symbolising the Saxon ducal crown, as new coat-of-arms of Saxony. The later rulers of the House of Wettin adopted the Ascanian coat-of-arms.

After the division, the counting of the dukes started anew. Though the first Ascanian duke is counted either as Bernard III (because of two predecessors of the same name before 1180) or as Bernard I, his successor, Albert I is counted as the first, although before 1180 he had one predecessor of the same name, Albert the Bear.

=== House of Ascania ===
==== Partitions of Saxony under Ascanian rule ====
Duchy of Saxony (1180–1296)
Duchy of Saxe-Wittenberg (1296–1356); Raised to: Electorate of Saxe-Wittenberg (1356–1422)	Duchy of Saxe-Lauenburg (1296–1303)
Duchy of Saxe-Wittenberg (1296–1356); Raised to: Electorate of Saxe-Wittenberg (1356–1422)		Duchy of Saxe-Ratzeburg (1303–1315)
Duchy of Saxe-Wittenberg (1296–1356); Raised to: Electorate of Saxe-Wittenberg (1356–1422)	Duchy of Saxe-Mölln (1303–1401)	Duchy of Saxe-Bergdorf (1303–1315); Renamed as Duchy of Saxe-Ratzeburg (1315-1401)
Duchy of Saxe-Wittenberg (1296–1356); Raised to: Electorate of Saxe-Wittenberg (1356–1422)	Duchy of Saxe-Lauenburg (Ratzeburg line) (1401–1689)

==== Table of rulers ====
(Note: Both lines follow the numbering established in this table until 1296, when they were created. From 1296 on, each line follows independently the succession of Saxon dukes until 1296)

Ruler	Born	Reign	Death	Ruling part	Consort	Notes
Bernard III	c.1134	1180–1212	2 February 1212	Saxony	Brigitte of Denmark six children Sophia of Thuringia one child Judith of Poland c.1173 no children	Also Count of Ballenstedt and Prince of Anhalt. Numberings starting with Ascanian rule or continuing after prior dukes of the same name. Father of the following.
Albert I	c.1175	1212–1260	7 October 1260	Saxony	Agnes of Austria; 1222 five children Agnes of Thuringia; 1238 three children Helene of Brunswick-Lüneburg; 1247 five children	Father of the following two dukes
Albert II	1250	1260–1296	25 August 1298	Saxony	Agnes of Austria; 1282 six children	Ruled jointly; and associated his nephews to the joint rulership after his brothers death. However, these three nephews divided the land with him. Albert II retained Saxe-Wittenberg, and became the head of the Elder Saxon Line; Albert III, Eric I and John II ruled together in Saxe-Lauenburg, becoming the founders of the Younger Saxon Line.
Albert II	1250	1296–1298	25 August 1298	Saxe-Wittenberg	Agnes of Austria; 1282 six children	Ruled jointly; and associated his nephews to the joint rulership after his brothers death. However, these three nephews divided the land with him. Albert II retained Saxe-Wittenberg, and became the head of the Elder Saxon Line; Albert III, Eric I and John II ruled together in Saxe-Lauenburg, becoming the founders of the Younger Saxon Line.
John I	1249	1260–1282	30 July 1285	Saxony	Ingeborg Birgersdotter of Sweden; 1270 eight children	Ruled jointly; and associated his nephews to the joint rulership after his brothers death. However, these three nephews divided the land with him. Albert II retained Saxe-Wittenberg, and became the head of the Elder Saxon Line; Albert III, Eric I and John II ruled together in Saxe-Lauenburg, becoming the founders of the Younger Saxon Line.
In 1296 Albert II and his nephews Albert III, Eric I, and John II ended their joint rule and divided Saxony into the Lauenburg line, where Albert III, Eric I, and John II continued to rule jointly until 1303, and the Wittenberg line, where Albert II continued as sole ruler until 1298. Since the Duke of Saxony was considered one of the prince-electors electing a new Holy Roman Emperor, conflict arose between the lines of Lauenburg and Wittenberg over the issue of who should cast Saxony's vote. In 1314 both lines found themselves on different sides in a double election. Eventually, the Dukes of Saxe-Wittenberg succeeded in 1356 after the promulgation of the Golden Bull. To distinguish him from other rulers bearing the title Duke of Saxony, he was commonly called Elector of Saxony.
John II	1275	1296–1303	22 April 1322	Saxe-Lauenburg	Elizabeth of Holstein-Rendsburg; 1315 one child	Children of John I, co-ruled first with their uncle Albert II since 1282 (since the death of their father), and in 1296 split the land with him. They retained Lauenburg, which they divided once more. Albert passed the land to his widow, and after her death, in 1315, the territory was realigned: Eric divided Bergdorf with his surviving brother and held all of his brother Albert's inheritance. However, he ended up abdicating to his son, and survived for most of his reign.
John II	1275	1303–1322	22 April 1322	Saxe-Mölln	Elizabeth of Holstein-Rendsburg; 1315 one child	Children of John I, co-ruled first with their uncle Albert II since 1282 (since the death of their father), and in 1296 split the land with him. They retained Lauenburg, which they divided once more. Albert passed the land to his widow, and after her death, in 1315, the territory was realigned: Eric divided Bergdorf with his surviving brother and held all of his brother Albert's inheritance. However, he ended up abdicating to his son, and survived for most of his reign.
Eric I	1280	1296–1303	1360	Saxe-Lauenburg	Elisabeth of Pomerania; 1316 or 1318 four children	Children of John I, co-ruled first with their uncle Albert II since 1282 (since the death of their father), and in 1296 split the land with him. They retained Lauenburg, which they divided once more. Albert passed the land to his widow, and after her death, in 1315, the territory was realigned: Eric divided Bergdorf with his surviving brother and held all of his brother Albert's inheritance. However, he ended up abdicating to his son, and survived for most of his reign.
Eric I	1280	1303–1338	1360	Saxe-Bergedorf (1303–15) Saxe-Ratzeburg (1315–38)	Elisabeth of Pomerania; 1316 or 1318 four children	Children of John I, co-ruled first with their uncle Albert II since 1282 (since the death of their father), and in 1296 split the land with him. They retained Lauenburg, which they divided once more. Albert passed the land to his widow, and after her death, in 1315, the territory was realigned: Eric divided Bergdorf with his surviving brother and held all of his brother Albert's inheritance. However, he ended up abdicating to his son, and survived for most of his reign.
Albert III	1281	1296-1303	1308	Saxe-Lauenburg	Margaret of Brandenburg-Salzwedel; 1302 two children	Children of John I, co-ruled first with their uncle Albert II since 1282 (since the death of their father), and in 1296 split the land with him. They retained Lauenburg, which they divided once more. Albert passed the land to his widow, and after her death, in 1315, the territory was realigned: Eric divided Bergdorf with his surviving brother and held all of his brother Albert's inheritance. However, he ended up abdicating to his son, and survived for most of his reign.
Albert III	1281	1303–1308	1308	Saxe-Ratzeburg	Margaret of Brandenburg-Salzwedel; 1302 two children	Children of John I, co-ruled first with their uncle Albert II since 1282 (since the death of their father), and in 1296 split the land with him. They retained Lauenburg, which they divided once more. Albert passed the land to his widow, and after her death, in 1315, the territory was realigned: Eric divided Bergdorf with his surviving brother and held all of his brother Albert's inheritance. However, he ended up abdicating to his son, and survived for most of his reign.
Margaret of Brandenburg-Salzwedel	1270	1308–1315	1 May 1315	Saxe-Ratzeburg	Przemysł II, King of Poland; 1302 two children Albert III; 1302 two children	Children of John I, co-ruled first with their uncle Albert II since 1282 (since the death of their father), and in 1296 split the land with him. They retained Lauenburg, which they divided once more. Albert passed the land to his widow, and after her death, in 1315, the territory was realigned: Eric divided Bergdorf with his surviving brother and held all of his brother Albert's inheritance. However, he ended up abdicating to his son, and survived for most of his reign.
In 1315, after the death of Margaret of Brandenburg, the remaining brothers Eric and John redesigned the political division in Saxe-Lauenburg; Eric retained all of Margaret's part, but had to give part of his original domains to his brother.
Rudolph I (Rudolf I)	1284	1298-1356 10 January 1356 – 12 March 1356	12 March 1356	Saxe-Wittenberg Electorate of Saxony	Jutta of Brandenburg; 1298 eight children Kunigunde of Poland; 28 August 1328 one child Agnes of Lindow-Ruppin; 1333 three children	In January 1356 the Golden Bull confirmed Rudolf I as the legitimate Saxon Prince-Elector, thus the rulers of Saxe-Wittenberg are conceived as Electors of Saxony.
The Golden Bull of 1356 confirmed the right to participate in the election of a Holy Roman Emperor to the Duke of Saxony in the Saxe-Wittenberg line.
Regency of Elizabeth of Holstein-Rendsburg (1322-1330)						
Albert IV	1315	1322–1343	1343	Saxe-Mölln	Beata of Schwerin; 1334 three child Sophia of Mecklenburg-Werle-Güstrow; 1341 no children	
Eric II	1318/20	1338–1368	1368	Saxe-Ratzeburg	Agnes of Holstein-Plön between 1342 and 1349 four children	
John III	c.1330	1343–1356	1356	Saxe-Mölln	Unmarried	Left no descendants. He was succeeded by his brother, Albert.
Albert V	c.1330	1356–1370	1370	Saxe-Mölln	Catherine of Mecklenburg-Werle-Güstrow; 25 January 1366 no children	Left no descendants. He was succeeded by his brother, Eric.
Rudolph II the Blind (Rudolf II. der Blinde)	1307	12 March 1356 – 6 December 1370	6 December 1370	Saxe-Wittenberg and Electorate of Saxony	Elisabeth of Hesse; Before 8 May 1336 one child	Left no descendants.
Wenceslaus I	1337	6 December 1370 – 15 May 1388	15 May 1388	Saxe-Wittenberg and Electorate of Saxony	Cecilia da Carrara; 23 January 1376 six children	Brother of his predecessor.
Eric III	c.1330	1370–1401	1401	Saxe-Mölln	Unmarried	Determined to enter to clergy, has to resign to succeed his brothers. He also left no descendants, which allowed the Saxe-Ratzeburg-Lauenburg line to reunite Saxe-Lauenburg.
Rudolph III	1378	15 May 1388 – 11 June 1419	11 June 1419	Saxe-Wittenberg and Electorate of Saxony	Anna of Meissen; 1387/89 three children Barbara of Legnica; March 1396 two children	Left no male descendants. he was succeeded by his brother, Albert.
In 1401 Saxe-Ratzeburg-Lauenburg inherited Saxe-Bergedorf-Mölln from the Ascanian Elder Lauenburg line there extinct upon Eric IV's death. The reunited duchy continued under the old name of Saxe-Lauenburg.
Eric IV	1354	1368–1401	21 June 1411/12	Saxe-Ratzeburg	Sophia of Brunswick-Lüneburg; 8 April 1373 ten children	In 1401 reunited Saxe-Lauenburg.
Eric IV	1354	1401–1411/12	21 June 1411/12	Saxe-Lauenburg	Sophia of Brunswick-Lüneburg; 8 April 1373 ten children	In 1401 reunited Saxe-Lauenburg.
Eric V	after 1373	1411/12–1436	1436	Saxe-Lauenburg	Elisabeth of Holstein-Rendsburg; 1404 no children Elisabeth of Weinsberg before 1422 one child	Ruled jointly. The numbering here leads to some confusion, as not all genealogists of the House of Ascania count John IV in the list of dukes of Saxe-Lauenburg, numbering John V (John IV's nephew) as John IV.
John IV	after 1373	1411/12–1414	1414	Saxe-Lauenburg	Unmarried	Ruled jointly. The numbering here leads to some confusion, as not all genealogists of the House of Ascania count John IV in the list of dukes of Saxe-Lauenburg, numbering John V (John IV's nephew) as John IV.
Albert IV	1375/80	11 June 1419 – (before 12 November) 1422	before 12 November 1422	Saxe-Wittenberg and Electorate of Saxony	Euphemia of Oleśnica; 14 January 1420 no children	Left no male descendants, which led the Ascanian Saxe-Wittenberg line to extinction.
The Ascanian Dynasty continued in Saxe-Lauenburg until 1689, but after the Lauenburgish line had finally lost the Saxon Electorate to the Wittenberg line in 1356 and failed to obtain the succession in the Electorate after 1422, recognition of the Dukes of Saxe-Lauenburg as Dukes of Saxony waned. To follow the remnant House of Ascania in Saxe-Lauenburg, follow this table. For the following Electors of Saxony, see below the House of Wettin.
Bernard IV	1385/93	1436–1463	16 July 1463	Saxe-Lauenburg	Adelaide of Pomerania-Stolp; 1428 two children	
John V	18 July 1439	1463–1507	15 August 1507	Saxe-Lauenburg	Dorothea of Brandenburg; 12 February 1464 twelve children	Sometimes numbered John IV. He is sometimes confused with his uncle, John IV (Eric V and Bernard IV's brother) and a son of his own (John IV, Bishop of Hildesheim).
Magnus I	1 January 1470	1507–1543	1 August 1543	Saxe-Lauenburg	Catherine of Brunswick-Wolfenbüttel; 20 November 1509; Wolfenbüttel six children	
Francis I	1510	1543-1571	19 March 1581	Saxe-Lauenburg	Sibylle of Saxony; 8 February 1540; Dresden nine children	In 1571 – highly indebted – Francis I resigned in favour of his eldest son Magnus II, who had promised to redeem the pawned ducal demesnes with funds he gained as Swedish military commander and by his marriage to a Swedish princess.
Magnus II	1543	1571–1573	14 March 1603	Saxe-Lauenburg	Sophia of Sweden; 4 July 1568; Stockholm one child	Eldest son of Francis I. He didn't pay the debts he promised to pay and led to war with his father and brothers. Two years later they deposed Magnus II and Francis I re-ascended. Magnus' violent and judicial attempts to regain the duchy failed. In 1588 he was imprisoned for the remainder of his life.
Francis I	1510	1573–1581	19 March 1581	Saxe-Lauenburg	Sibylle of Saxony; 8 February 1540; Dresden nine children	Regained the title in 1573, after pushing back Magnus II.
Francis II	10 August 1547	1581–1619	2 July 1619	Saxe-Lauenburg	Margaret of Pomerania-Wolgast; 26 December 1574; Wolgast four children Maria of Brunswick-Wolfenbüttel; 10 November 1582; Wolfenbüttel fourteen children	Brother of Magnus II. Vice-regent from 1578, administrator from 1581. Joint rule with his brother Maurice between 1581 and 1612. Father of Augustus and Julius Henry.
Maurice	1551	1581–1612	2 November 1612	Saxe-Lauenburg	Katharina von Spörck; 1581 (annulled 1582) no children	Ruled jointly with his brother Francis II.
Augustus	17 February 1577	1619–1656	18 January 1656	Saxe-Lauenburg	Elisabeth Sofie of Holstein-Gottorp; 5 March 1621; Husum six children Catherine of Oldenburg; 4 June 1633 no children	Left no male descendants; he was succeeded by his half-brother Julius Henry.
Julius Henry	9 April 1586	1656–1665	20 November 1665	Saxe-Lauenburg	Anna of East Frisia; 17 March 1617; Grabow no children Elisabeth Sophia of Brandenburg; 4 June 1633; Toužim one son Anna Magdalena of Lobkowicz; 18 August 1632; Vienna six children	
Francis Erdmann	25 February 1629	1665–1666	30 July 1666	Saxe-Lauenburg	Sibylle Hedwig of Saxe-Lauenburg; 1654 no children	Left no descendants; He was succeeded by his brother Julius Francis.
Julius Francis	16 September 1641	1666–1689	30 September 1689	Saxe-Lauenburg	Hedwig of the Palatinate-Sulzbach; 9 April 1668; Sulzbach two children	

The male line of the Saxe-Lauenburgish Ascanians was extinguished in 1689, after Julius Francis' death. In spite of having left two daughters to inherit the rights to the duchy, the House of Welf usurped the duchy, preventing the succession of the legitimate heiress, Anna Maria Franziska of Saxe-Lauenburg, and resucceeded with its Brunswick and Lunenburg-Celle line. In fact, George William, Duke of Brunswick-Lüneburg was a great-great-grandson of Magnus I through his great-grandmother Dorothea of Saxe-Lauenburg. His descendants became Monarchs of Great Britain from 1714 on. In 1814, after being deposed by various occupations in the Napoleonic Wars, George III's son, Regent George agreed to pass Saxe-Lauenburg to his Danish cousin in a general territorial realignment at the Congress of Vienna. This cousin was Frederick VI of Denmark, who changed the official colours of Saxe-Lauenburg to red and gold. The duchy changed hands again when, in 1865, Christian IX of Denmark was deposed in Second Schleswig War and resigned by Treaty of Vienna; Saxe-Lauenburg passed to William I of Prussia, to whom the Estates of Saxe-Lauenburg offered the ducal throne. The coat-of-arms of Saxe-Lauenburg was changed to the colours red and silver, with a border in the Prussian colours of black and white. Both duke and estates decided to merge Saxe-Lauenburg into Prussia, as district Duchy of Lauenburg, with effect from 1 July 1876.

=== House of Wettin ===
The Ascanian line of Saxe-Wittenberg became extinct with the death of Elector Albert III in 1422, whereafter Emperor Sigismund bestowed the country and electoral dignity upon Margrave Frederick IV of Meissen, who had been a loyal supporter in the Hussite Wars. Late Albert's Ascanian relative Duke Eric V of Saxe-Lauenburg protested in vain. Frederick, now one of the seven Prince-electors, was a member of the House of Wettin, which since 1089 had ruled over the adjacent Margraviate of Meissen up the Elbe river, established under Emperor Otto I in 965, and since 1242 also over the Landgraviate of Thuringia. Thus, in 1423, Saxe-Wittenberg, the Margraviate of Meissen and Thuringia were united under one ruler, and the unified territory. gradually received the name of (Upper) Saxony (or simply Saxony).

==== Partitions of Saxony under Wettin rule ====
Electorate of Saxony (1422–1464)
Albertine territories	Ernestine territories
Albertine Duchy of Saxony (1464–1547)	Ernestine Electorate of Saxony (1464–1547)
Coburg (1542–53)
Albertine Electorate of Saxony (1547–1806)	Ernestine Duchy of Saxony (1547–1554)
Coburg & Eisenach (1554–66)	Gotha (1554–65)	Weimar (1554–66)
Ernestine Duchy of Saxony (1566–72)
Coburg-Eisenach (1572–1638) (Divided in Coburg and Eisenach 1596–1633)	Weimar (1572–1741)
Altenburg (1603–1672)
Eisenach (1640–44)	Gotha (1640–72)
Zeitz (1656–1718)	Merseburg (1656–1738)	Weissenfels (1656–1746) (Renamed Querfurt 1680–1739)
Marksuhl (1662–71)	Jena (1662–90)
Eisenach (1662-1741)	Gotha & Altenburg (1672–1826)
Merseburg-Lauchstädt (1684–90)	Weissenfels-Barby (1680–1739)	Eisenberg (1675–1707)	Meiningen (1675–1918)	Saalfeld (1675–99)	Coburg (1675–99)	Römhild (1675–1710)
Zeitz-Pegau-Neustadt (1699–1713)	Merseburg-Zörbig (1691–1715)	Merseburg-Spremberg (1694–1731)	Coburg-Saalfeld (1699–1826)
Weissenfels-Dahme (1711–15)
Hildburghausen (1675–1826) renamed Altenburg (1826–1918)
Weimar-Eisenach (1741–1918) (Personal union between 1741 and 1809; Elevated to Grand Duchy 1815)
Kingdom of Saxony (1806–1918)
Prussian Province of Saxony (1815–1918)	Coburg-Gotha (1826–1918)

==== Table of rulers ====
Ruler	Born	Reign	Death	Ruling part	Consort	Notes
Frederick I the Warlike (Friedrich der Streitbare)	11 April 1370	6 January 1423 – 4 January 1428	4 January 1428	Duchy of Saxony and Electorate of Saxony	Catherine of Brunswick-Lüneburg; 7 February 1402 seven children	After the Wittenberg line of the Ascanians became extinct, the Electorate was given to Frederick, Margrave of Meissen and Landgrave of Thuringia, of the House of Wettin.
Frederick II the Gentle (Friedrich der Sanftmütige)	22 April 1412	4 January 1428 – 7 September 1464	7 September 1464	Duchy of Saxony and Electorate of Saxony	Margaret of Austria; 3 June 1431; Leipzig eight children	Son of Frederick I. Ruled jointly in Saxony with his brothers, but was the sole holder of the Electorate. Father of Ernest and Albert, founders of the Ernestine and Albertine Saxon lines.
Ernest I (Ernst)	24 March 1441	7 September 1464 – 26 August 1486	26 August 1486	Ernestine; Electorate of Saxony	Elisabeth of Bavaria-Munich; 25 November 1460; Leipzig seven children	Son of Frederick II. He was the founder and progenitor of the Ernestine line of Saxon princes.
Albert III the Bold	27 January 1443	1464–1500	12 September 1500	Albertine; Duchy of Saxony	Sidonie of Poděbrady; 11 November 1464; Cheb nine children	Son of Frederick II. He was the founder and progenitor of the Albertine line of Saxon princes.
Frederick III the Wise (Friedrich der Weise)	17 January 1463	26 August 1486 – 5 May 1525	5 May 1525	Ernestine; Electorate of Saxony	Unmarried	Son of Ernest. Protector of Martin Luther, but a lifelong Catholic. Left no male descendants. Ruled jointly with his brother John, who succeeded him.
George I the Bearded	27 August 1471	1500–1539	17 April 1539	Albertine; Duchy of Saxony	Barbara of Poland; 21 November 1496; Dresden ten children	Proponent of Catholic Reform and a staunch opponent of Martin Luther. Left no surviving male descendants. He was succeeded by his brother Henry.
John I the Steadfast (Johann der Beständige)	30 June 1468	5 May 1525 – 16 August 1532	16 August 1532	Ernestine; Electorate of Saxony	Sophie of Mecklenburg; 1 March 1500; Torgau one child Margaret of Anhalt-Köthen; 13 November 1513; Torgau four children	Co-regent of his brother Frederick III (26 August 1486 – 5 May 1525), with his own residence at Weimar since 1513. Established Lutheranism in his territories in 1527.
John Frederick I the Magnanimous (Johann Friedrich I der Großmütige)	30 June 1503	16 August 1532 – 19 May 1547	3 March 1554	Ernestine; Electorate of Saxony	Sibylle of Cleves; 9 February 1527; Torgau four children	Lost his Electoral dignity and territory to his cousin Maurice after being defeated by the Emperor in the Schmalkaldic War. He was left with some territories as the Duchy of Saxony. After his death the Duchy of Saxony was divided between his three sons.
John Frederick I the Magnanimous (Johann Friedrich I der Großmütige)	30 June 1503	19 May 1547 – 1554	3 March 1554	Ernestine; Duchy of Saxony	Sibylle of Cleves; 9 February 1527; Torgau four children	Lost his Electoral dignity and territory to his cousin Maurice after being defeated by the Emperor in the Schmalkaldic War. He was left with some territories as the Duchy of Saxony. After his death the Duchy of Saxony was divided between his three sons.
John Ernest I	10 May 1521	16 August 1532 – 8 February 1553	8 February 1553	Ernestine; Saxe-Coburg	Catherine of Brunswick-Grubenhagen; 12 February 1542; Torgau no children	Until 1542, John Ernest was co-regent of his brother, Elector John Frederick I. When John Frederick decided to rule alone, he created the Duchy of Saxe-Coburg for his brother. After his death without descendants, the land reverted to John Frederick.
Henry IV the Pious	16 March 1473	1539–1541	18 August 1541	Albertine; Duchy of Saxony	Catherine of Mecklenburg; 69 January 1541; Marburg nine children	Succeeded his brother George I. He established Lutheranism in Albertine Saxony.
Maurice I (Moritz)	21 March 1521	1541–1547	9 July 1553	Albertine; Duchy of Saxony	Agnes of Hesse; 9 January 1541; Marburg two children	Second cousin of John Frederick, grandson of Albert. Though a Lutheran, allied with Emperor Charles V against the Schmalkaldic League. Gained the Electorate for the Albertine line in 1547 after Charles V's victory at the Battle of Mühlberg. Left no male descendants. He was succeeded by his brother Augustus.
Maurice I (Moritz)	21 March 1521	4 June 1547 – 9 July 1553	9 July 1553	Albertine; Electorate of Saxony	Agnes of Hesse; 9 January 1541; Marburg two children	Second cousin of John Frederick, grandson of Albert. Though a Lutheran, allied with Emperor Charles V against the Schmalkaldic League. Gained the Electorate for the Albertine line in 1547 after Charles V's victory at the Battle of Mühlberg. Left no male descendants. He was succeeded by his brother Augustus.
Following their displacement by the Albertines, the Ernestine branch of the Wettins continued to rule in southern Thuringia as "Dukes of Saxony", but their lands eventually split up into many different tiny Ernestine duchies.
Augustus I (August)	31 July 1526	9 July 1553 – 11 February 1586	11 February 1586	Albertine; Electorate of Saxony	Anna of Denmark; 7 October 1548; Torgau fifteen children Agnes Hedwig of Anhalt; 3 January 1586; Dessau no children	Brother of Maurice. Recognized as Elector by the ousted John Frederick I in 1554. From 1573 he was also regent for Frederick William, in the Ernestine duchy of Saxe-Weimar.
John Frederick II	8 January 1529	1554–1565	19 May 1595	Ernestine; Saxe-Coburg -Eisenach	Agnes of Hesse; 26 May 1555; Weimar no children Elisabeth of the Palatinate-Simmern-Sponheim; 12 June 1558; Weimar four children	Received Saxe-Weimar. In 1565 united his domains with those of his younger brother in Gotha. In 1566 abdicated in favor of his brother John William, who reunited the duchy.
John Frederick II	8 January 1529	1565–1566	19 May 1595	Ernestine; Saxe-Coburg -Eisenach and Saxe-Gotha	Agnes of Hesse; 26 May 1555; Weimar no children Elisabeth of the Palatinate-Simmern-Sponheim; 12 June 1558; Weimar four children	Received Saxe-Weimar. In 1565 united his domains with those of his younger brother in Gotha. In 1566 abdicated in favor of his brother John William, who reunited the duchy.
John Frederick III the Younger	16 January 1538	1554–1565	21 October 1565	Ernestine; Saxe-Gotha	Unmarried	Received Saxe-Gotha. However he left its administration to his elder brothers. After his death, his domains were annexed by his elder brother.
John William I	11 March 1530	1554–1566	2 March 1573	Ernestine; Saxe-Weimar	Dorothea Susanne of the Palatinate-Simmern; 15 June 1560; Heidelberg five children	Received Saxe-Weimar. In 1565 united his domains with those of his younger brother in Gotha. Reunited Saxony in 1566, after the abdication of his older brother. In 1572, the Division of Erfurt divided Saxony once again, between John William and his nephews, sons of John Frederick II. He received once more Saxe-Weimar.
John William I	11 March 1530	1566–1572	2 March 1573	Ernestine; Duchy of Saxony	Dorothea Susanne of the Palatinate-Simmern; 15 June 1560; Heidelberg five children	Received Saxe-Weimar. In 1565 united his domains with those of his younger brother in Gotha. Reunited Saxony in 1566, after the abdication of his older brother. In 1572, the Division of Erfurt divided Saxony once again, between John William and his nephews, sons of John Frederick II. He received once more Saxe-Weimar.
John William I	11 March 1530	1572–1573	2 March 1573	Ernestine; Saxe-Weimar	Dorothea Susanne of the Palatinate-Simmern; 15 June 1560; Heidelberg five children	Received Saxe-Weimar. In 1565 united his domains with those of his younger brother in Gotha. Reunited Saxony in 1566, after the abdication of his older brother. In 1572, the Division of Erfurt divided Saxony once again, between John William and his nephews, sons of John Frederick II. He received once more Saxe-Weimar.
John Casimir	12 June 1564	1572–1596	16 July 1633	Ernestine; Saxe-Coburg -Eisenach	Anna of Saxony; 16 January 1586; Dresden no children Margaret of Brunswick-Lüneburg; 16 September 1599; Coburg no children	Sons of John Frederick II, ruled jointly. In 1596 divided the land. John Casimir received Saxe-Coburg and John Ernest received Saxe-Eisenach. In 1633 John Casimir died without descendants and John Ernest reunited again Saxe-Coburg-Eisenach. However, as he also didn't have heirs, the duchies were divided between its neighbours Saxe-Altenburg and Saxe-Weimar.
John Casimir	12 June 1564	1596–1633	16 July 1633	Ernestine; Saxe-Coburg	Anna of Saxony; 16 January 1586; Dresden no children Margaret of Brunswick-Lüneburg; 16 September 1599; Coburg no children	Sons of John Frederick II, ruled jointly. In 1596 divided the land. John Casimir received Saxe-Coburg and John Ernest received Saxe-Eisenach. In 1633 John Casimir died without descendants and John Ernest reunited again Saxe-Coburg-Eisenach. However, as he also didn't have heirs, the duchies were divided between its neighbours Saxe-Altenburg and Saxe-Weimar.
John Ernest I	9 July 1566	1572–1596	23 October 1638	Ernestine; Saxe-Coburg -Eisenach	Elisabeth of Mansfeld-Hinterort; 23 November 1591; Wiener Neustadt one child Christine of Hesse-Kassel; 14 May 1598; Rotenburg an der Fulda no children	Sons of John Frederick II, ruled jointly. In 1596 divided the land. John Casimir received Saxe-Coburg and John Ernest received Saxe-Eisenach. In 1633 John Casimir died without descendants and John Ernest reunited again Saxe-Coburg-Eisenach. However, as he also didn't have heirs, the duchies were divided between its neighbours Saxe-Altenburg and Saxe-Weimar.
John Ernest I	9 July 1566	1596–1633	23 October 1638	Ernestine; Saxe-Eisenach	Elisabeth of Mansfeld-Hinterort; 23 November 1591; Wiener Neustadt one child Christine of Hesse-Kassel; 14 May 1598; Rotenburg an der Fulda no children	Sons of John Frederick II, ruled jointly. In 1596 divided the land. John Casimir received Saxe-Coburg and John Ernest received Saxe-Eisenach. In 1633 John Casimir died without descendants and John Ernest reunited again Saxe-Coburg-Eisenach. However, as he also didn't have heirs, the duchies were divided between its neighbours Saxe-Altenburg and Saxe-Weimar.
John Ernest I	9 July 1566	1633–1638	23 October 1638	Ernestine; Saxe-Coburg -Eisenach	Elisabeth of Mansfeld-Hinterort; 23 November 1591; Wiener Neustadt one child Christine of Hesse-Kassel; 14 May 1598; Rotenburg an der Fulda no children	Sons of John Frederick II, ruled jointly. In 1596 divided the land. John Casimir received Saxe-Coburg and John Ernest received Saxe-Eisenach. In 1633 John Casimir died without descendants and John Ernest reunited again Saxe-Coburg-Eisenach. However, as he also didn't have heirs, the duchies were divided between its neighbours Saxe-Altenburg and Saxe-Weimar.
Saxe-Coburg-Eisenach divided between its neighbours Saxe-Altenburg and Saxe-Weimar
Regency of Augustus I, Elector of Saxony (1573-1586)						After his death, his brother took the land and in the next year divided it with his nephews (sons of Frederick William).
Frederick William I	25 April 1562	1573–1602	7 July 1602	Ernestine; Saxe-Weimar	Sophie of Württemberg; 5 May 1583; Weimar six children Anna Maria of the Palatinate-Neuburg; 9 September 1591; Neuburg an der Donau six children	After his death, his brother took the land and in the next year divided it with his nephews (sons of Frederick William).
Christian I (Christian I)	29 October 1560	11 February 1586 – 25 September 1591	25 September 1591	Albertine; Electorate of Saxony	Sophie of Brandenburg; 25 April 1582; Dresden seven children	
Regency of Sophie of Brandenburg (1591-1601)						
Christian II (Christian II)	23 September 1583	25 September 1591 – 23 June 1611	23 June 1611	Albertine; Electorate of Saxony	Hedwig of Denmark; 12 September 1602; Dresden no children	
John II	22 May 1570	1602–1605	18 July 1605	Ernestine; Saxe-Weimar	Dorothea Maria of Anhalt; 7 January 1593; Altenburg twelve children	Divided Saxe-Weimar with his nephews in 1603, retaining a smaller Saxe-Weimar (sometimes called Saxe-Weimar-Jena).
John Philip	25 January 1597	1603–1639	1 April 1639	Ernestine; Saxe-Altenburg	Elisabeth of Brunswick-Wolfenbüttel; 25 October 1618; Altenburg one child	Received and ruled jointly the newly created Saxe-Altenburg, after the partition of 1603. None of them had male descendants.
Frederick	12 February 1599	1603–1625	24 October 1625	Ernestine; Saxe-Altenburg	Unmarried	Received and ruled jointly the newly created Saxe-Altenburg, after the partition of 1603. None of them had male descendants.
John William	13 April 1600	1603–1632	2 December 1632	Ernestine; Saxe-Altenburg	Unmarried	Received and ruled jointly the newly created Saxe-Altenburg, after the partition of 1603. None of them had male descendants.
John Ernest I	21 February 1594	1605–1626	6 December 1626	Ernestine; Saxe-Weimar	Unmarried	Sons of John IV, ruled jointly. In 1640 divided the land. William kept Saxe-Weimar. In 1644 William reunited his own domains with Albert's. After William's death his domains were divided by his four sons. On the other hand, Ernest inherited Saxe-Gotha and reunited it with his wife's (as heiress of Saxe-Altenburg).
William I the Great	11 April 1598	1626–1644	17 May 1662	Ernestine; Saxe-Weimar	Eleonore Dorothea of Anhalt-Dessau; 23 May 1625; Weimar nine children	Sons of John IV, ruled jointly. In 1640 divided the land. William kept Saxe-Weimar. In 1644 William reunited his own domains with Albert's. After William's death his domains were divided by his four sons. On the other hand, Ernest inherited Saxe-Gotha and reunited it with his wife's (as heiress of Saxe-Altenburg).
William I the Great	11 April 1598	1644–1662	17 May 1662	Ernestine; Saxe-Weimar and Saxe-Eisenach	Eleonore Dorothea of Anhalt-Dessau; 23 May 1625; Weimar nine children	Sons of John IV, ruled jointly. In 1640 divided the land. William kept Saxe-Weimar. In 1644 William reunited his own domains with Albert's. After William's death his domains were divided by his four sons. On the other hand, Ernest inherited Saxe-Gotha and reunited it with his wife's (as heiress of Saxe-Altenburg).
Albert IV	27 July 1599	1605–1640	20 December 1644	Ernestine; Saxe-Weimar	Dorothea of Saxe-Altenburg; 24 June 1633; Weimar no children	Sons of John IV, ruled jointly. In 1640 divided the land. William kept Saxe-Weimar. In 1644 William reunited his own domains with Albert's. After William's death his domains were divided by his four sons. On the other hand, Ernest inherited Saxe-Gotha and reunited it with his wife's (as heiress of Saxe-Altenburg).
Albert IV	27 July 1599	1640–1644	20 December 1644	Ernestine; Saxe (-Weimar) -Eisenach	Dorothea of Saxe-Altenburg; 24 June 1633; Weimar no children	Sons of John IV, ruled jointly. In 1640 divided the land. William kept Saxe-Weimar. In 1644 William reunited his own domains with Albert's. After William's death his domains were divided by his four sons. On the other hand, Ernest inherited Saxe-Gotha and reunited it with his wife's (as heiress of Saxe-Altenburg).
Ernest I the Pious	25 December 1601	1605–1640	26 March 1675	Ernestine; Saxe-Weimar	Elisabeth Sophie of Saxe-Altenburg; 24 October 1636; Altenburg eighteen children	Sons of John IV, ruled jointly. In 1640 divided the land. William kept Saxe-Weimar. In 1644 William reunited his own domains with Albert's. After William's death his domains were divided by his four sons. On the other hand, Ernest inherited Saxe-Gotha and reunited it with his wife's (as heiress of Saxe-Altenburg).
Ernest I the Pious	25 December 1601	1640–1672	26 March 1675	Ernestine; Saxe (-Weimar) -Gotha	Elisabeth Sophie of Saxe-Altenburg; 24 October 1636; Altenburg eighteen children	Sons of John IV, ruled jointly. In 1640 divided the land. William kept Saxe-Weimar. In 1644 William reunited his own domains with Albert's. After William's death his domains were divided by his four sons. On the other hand, Ernest inherited Saxe-Gotha and reunited it with his wife's (as heiress of Saxe-Altenburg).
Ernest I the Pious	25 December 1601	1672–1675	26 March 1675	Ernestine; Saxe-Gotha-Altenburg	Elisabeth Sophie of Saxe-Altenburg; 24 October 1636; Altenburg eighteen children	Sons of John IV, ruled jointly. In 1640 divided the land. William kept Saxe-Weimar. In 1644 William reunited his own domains with Albert's. After William's death his domains were divided by his four sons. On the other hand, Ernest inherited Saxe-Gotha and reunited it with his wife's (as heiress of Saxe-Altenburg).
John George I (Johann Georg I)	5 March 1585	23 June 1611 – 8 October 1656	8 October 1656	Albertine; Electorate of Saxony	Sibylle Elisabeth of Württemberg; 16 September 1604; Dresden one child Magdalene Sibylle of Prussia; 19 July 1607; Torgau ten children	Brother of Christian II, ruled during the Thirty Years' War, during which he was at times allied with the Emperor and at times with the King of Sweden.
Frederick William II	12 February 1602	1639–1669	22 April 1669	Ernestine; Saxe-Altenburg	Sophie Elisabeth of Brandenburg; 18 September 1638; Altenburg no children Magdalene Sibylle of Saxony; 11 October 1652; Dresden three children	Brother of John Philip, Frederick and John William. Succeeded his childless brothers. Received part of Saxe-Weimar-Eiesnach in 1638.
John George II (Johann Georg II)	31 May 1613	8 October 1656 – 22 August 1680	22 August 1680	Albertine; Electorate of Saxony	Magdalene Sibylle of Brandenburg-Bayreuth; 13 November 1638; Dresden three children	Elector, he also served as regent in Saxe-Altenburg for Frederick William III. The minor duke never reached adulthood.
Augustus I	13 August 1614	1656–1680	4 June 1680	Albertine; Saxe-Weissenfels	Anna Maria of Mecklenburg-Schwerin; 23 November 1647; Schwerin twelve children Johanna Walpurgis of Leiningen-Westerburg; 29 January 1672; Halle three children	Son of Elector John George I. Inherited Saxe-Weissenfels. After his death, Weissenfels was divided.
Christian I	27 October 1615	1656–1691	18 October 1691	Albertine; Saxe-Merseburg	Christiana of Schleswig-Holstein-Sonderburg-Glücksburg; 19 November 1650; Dresden eleven children	Son of Elector John George I. Inherited Saxe-Merseburg.
Maurice I	28 March 1619	1662–1681	4 December 1681	Albertine; Saxe-Zeitz	Sophie Hedwig of Schleswig-Holstein-Sonderburg-Glücksburg; 19 November 1650; Dresden two children Dorothea Maria of Saxe-Weimar; 3 July 1656; Weimar ten children Sophie Elisabeth of Schleswig-Holstein-Sonderburg-Wiesenburg; 14 June 1676; Wiesenburg no children	Son of Elector John George I. Inherited Saxe-Zeitz.
Bernard II	14 October 1638	1662–1678	3 May 1678	Ernestine; Saxe-Jena	Marie Charlotte de la Trémoille; 10 June 1662; Paris five children	Son of William I. Received Saxe-Jena.
John Ernest II	11 September 1627	1662–1683	15 May 1683	Ernestine; Saxe-Weimar	Christine Elisabeth of Schleswig-Holstein-Sonderburg; 14 August 1656; Weimar five children	Son of William I. Received the remaining Saxe-Weimar. He also served as regent for his nephew, John William of Saxe-Jena.
Adolf William	15 May 1632	1662–1668	21 November 1668	Ernestine; Saxe-Eisenach	Marie Elisabeth of Brunswick-Wolfenbüttel; 18 January 1663; Wolfenbüttel five children	Son of William I. Received Saxe-Eisenach.
Regency of John George I, Duke of Saxe-Marksuhl (1668-1671)						Died as a minor. His uncle, as regent, inherited his domain.
William August	30 November 1668	1668–1671	23 February 1671	Ernestine; Saxe-Eisenach	Unmarried	Died as a minor. His uncle, as regent, inherited his domain.
John George I	11 April 1598	1662–1671	17 May 1662	Ernestine; Saxe-Marksuhl	Johannetta of Sayn-Wittgenstein; 29 May 1661; Wallau nine children	Son of William I. Received Saxe-Marksuhl. He also served as regent for his nephew William August in Saxe-Eisenach, but after his nephew's death in 1671, he inherited it himself, merging Marksuhl in Eisenach. From 1683 he also became regent for another nephew, John William III, in Saxe-Jena.
John George I	11 April 1598	1671–1686	17 May 1662	Ernestine; Saxe-Eisenach	Johannetta of Sayn-Wittgenstein; 29 May 1661; Wallau nine children	Son of William I. Received Saxe-Marksuhl. He also served as regent for his nephew William August in Saxe-Eisenach, but after his nephew's death in 1671, he inherited it himself, merging Marksuhl in Eisenach. From 1683 he also became regent for another nephew, John William III, in Saxe-Jena.
Saxe-Marksuhl merged in Saxe-Eisenach
Regency of John George II, Elector of Saxony (1669-1672)						Son of Frederick William II. Died as a minor. His lands were divided between Saxe-Gotha and Saxe-Weimar.
Frederick William III	12 July 1657	1669–1672	14 April 1672	Ernestine; Saxe-Altenburg	Unmarried	Son of Frederick William II. Died as a minor. His lands were divided between Saxe-Gotha and Saxe-Weimar.
Saxe-Altenburg merged in Saxe-Gotha to form Saxe-Gotha-Altenburg
Frederick I	15 July 1646	1675–1691	2 August 1691	Ernestine; Saxe-Gotha-Altenburg	Magdalena Sibylle of Saxe-Weissenfels; 14 November 1669; Halle eight children Christine of Baden-Durlach; 14 August 1681; Ansbach no children	Son of Ernest I. Received Saxe-Gotha-Altenburg.
Albert V	24 May 1648	1675–1699	6 August 1699	Ernestine; Saxe-Coburg	Marie Elisabeth of Brunswick-Wolfenbüttel; 18 July 1676; Gotha one child Susanne Elisabeth Kempinsky; 24 May 1688; Coburg (morganatic) no children	Son of Ernest I. Received Saxe-Coburg. Left no male descendants. His lands were annexed by Saafeld.
Saxe-Coburg merged in Saxe-Saalfeld to form Saxe-Coburg-Saalfeld
Bernard I	10 September 1649	1675–1706	27 April 1706	Ernestine; Saxe-Meiningen	Marie Hedwig of Hesse-Darmstadt; 20 November 1671; Gotha seven children Elisabeth Eleonore of Brunswick-Wolfenbüttel; 25 January 1681; Schöningen five children	Son of Ernest I. Received Saxe-Meiningen. He also served as regent, together with his brother Henry, for their nephew, Frederick II, in Saxe-Gotha-Altenburg.
Henry	19 November 1650	1675–1710	13 May 1710	Ernestine; Saxe-Römhild	Marie Elisabeth of Hesse-Darmstadt; 1 March 1676; Darmstadt no children	Son of Ernest I. Received Saxe-Römhild. Left no descendants and his lands were annexed to Saxe-Coburg-Saalfeld. He also served as regent, together with his brother Henry, for their nephew, Frederick II.
Saxe-Römhild was annexed by Saxe-Coburg-Saalfeld
Christian	6 January 1653	1675–1707	28 April 1707	Ernestine; Saxe-Eisenberg	Christiane of Saxe-Merseburg; 13 February 1677; Merseburg one child Sophie Marie of Hesse-Darmstadt; 9 February 1681; Darmstadt no children	Son of Ernest I. Received Saxe-Eisenberg. Left no male descendants and his lands were annexed to Saxe-Hildburghausen.
Saxe-Eisenberg was annexed by Saxe-Hildburghausen
Ernest I	12 June 1655	1675–1715	17 October 1715	Ernestine; Saxe-Hildburghausen	Sophie of Waldeck; 30 November 1680; Arolsen eighteen children	Son of Ernest I of Saxe-Gotha. Received Saxe-Hildburghausen.
John Ernest	22 August 1658	1675–1699	17 February 1729	Ernestine; Saxe-Saalfeld	Sophie Hedwig of Saxe-Merseburg; 18 February 1680; Merseburg five children Charlotte Johanna of Waldeck-Wildungen; 2 December 1690; Maastricht eight children	Son of Ernest I. Received Saxe-Saafeld. In 1699 reunified it with Saxe-Coburg, forming Saxe-Coburg-Saalfeld.
John Ernest	22 August 1658	1699–1729	17 February 1729	Ernestine; Saxe-Coburg-Saalfeld	Sophie Hedwig of Saxe-Merseburg; 18 February 1680; Merseburg five children Charlotte Johanna of Waldeck-Wildungen; 2 December 1690; Maastricht eight children	Son of Ernest I. Received Saxe-Saafeld. In 1699 reunified it with Saxe-Coburg, forming Saxe-Coburg-Saalfeld.
Regencies of John Ernest II, Duke of Saxe-Weimar (1678-83), John George I, Duke of Saxe-Eisenach (1683-86) and William Ernest, Duke of Saxe-Weimar (1686-90)						Son of Bernard II. Died as a minor.
John William	28 March 1675	1678–1690	4 November 1690	Ernestine; Saxe-Jena	Unmarried	Son of Bernard II. Died as a minor.
Saxe-Coburg-Eisenach divided between its neighbours Saxe-Eisenach and Saxe-Weimar
John George III (Johann Georg III)	20 June 1647	22 August 1680 – 12 September 1691	12 September 1691	Albertine; Electorate of Saxony	Anna Sophie of Denmark; 9 October 1666; Copenhagen two children	
John Adolph I	2 November 1649	1680–1697	24 May 1697	Albertine; Saxe-Weissenfels-Querfurt	Johanna Magdalena of Saxe-Altenburg; 25 October 1671; Altenburg eleven children Christiane Wilhelmine of Bünau; 3 February 1692; Querfurt (morganatic) eleven children	Inherited the remaining Saxe-Weissenfels.
Henry	29 September 1657	1680–1728	16 February 1728	Albertine; Saxe-Weissenfels-Barby	Elisabeth Albertine of Anhalt-Dessau; 30 March 1686; Dessau seven children	Inherited Saxe-Weissenfels-Barby.
Maurice William	12 March 1664	1681–1718	15 November 1718	Albertine; Saxe-Zeitz	Marie Amalie of Brandenburg; 25 June 1689; Potsdam five children	Left no descendants. After his death Saxe-Zeitz merged in the Electorate.
Saxe-Zeitz merged in the Electorate of Saxony
William Ernest I	19 October 1662	1683–1728	26 August 1728	Ernestine; Saxe-Weimar	Charlotte Marie of Saxe-Jena; 2 November 1683; Eisenach no children	Ruled jointly. John Ernest was just a nominal ruler; William Ernest had full government. William Ernest also served as regent for his cousin, John William, in Saxe-Jena.
John Ernest III	22 June 1664	1683–1707	10 May 1707	Ernestine; Saxe-Weimar	Sophie Auguste of Anhalt-Zerbst; 11 October 1685; Zerbst five children Charlotte of Hesse-Homburg; 4 November 1694; Kassel four children	Ruled jointly. John Ernest was just a nominal ruler; William Ernest had full government. William Ernest also served as regent for his cousin, John William, in Saxe-Jena.
Philip	26 October 1657	1684–1690	1 July 1690	Albertine; Saxe-Merseburg-Lauchstädt	Eleonore Sophie of Saxe-Weimar; 9 July 1684; Weimar two children Louise Elisabeth of Württemberg-Oels; 17 August 1688; Bernstadt one child	Son of Christian. Received from his father the town of Lauchstädt, and ruled it in his father's lifetime. After his death his land returned to is father.
John George II	24 July 1665	1686–1698	10 November 1698	Ernestine; Saxe-Eisenach	Sophie Charlotte of Württemberg; 20 September 1688; Kirchheim unter Teck no children	Left no descendants. He was succeeded by his brother.
John George IV (Johann Georg IV)	18 October 1668	12 September 1691 – 27 April 1694	27 April 1694	Albertine; Electorate of Saxony	Eleonore Erdmuthe of Saxe-Eisenach; 17 April 1692; Leipzig no children	
Christian II	19 November 1653	1691–1694	20 October 1694	Albertine; Saxe-Merseburg	Erdmuthe Dorothea of Saxe-Zeitz; 14 October 1679; Moritzburg seven children	
Augustus	15 February 1655	1691–1715	27 March 1715	Albertine; Saxe-Merseburg-Zörbig	Hedwig of Mecklenburg-Güstrow; 1 December 1686; Güstrow eight children	Son of Christian. Received from his brother the town of Zörbig. Left no male descendants. His lands returned to Saxe-Merseburg.
Saxe-Merseburg-Zörbig merged in Saxe-Merseburg
Regencies of Bernhard I, Duke of Saxe-Meiningen and Henry, Duke of Saxe-Römhild (1691-1693)						
Frederick II	28 July 1676	1691–1732	23 March 1732	Ernestine; Saxe-Gotha-Altenburg	Magdalena Augusta of Anhalt-Zerbst; 7 June 1696; Gotha nineteen children	
Frederick Augustus I the Strong (Friedrich August I)	12 May 1670	27 April 1694 – 1 February 1733	1 February 1733	Albertine; Electorate of Saxony	Christiane Eberhardine of Brandenburg-Bayreuth; 20 January 1693; Bayreuth one child	Brother of John George IV. Converted to Catholicism 1697 in order to compete for the crown of Poland. Took the Polish crown 1697, opposed by Stanisław Leszczyński, in 1704, forced to renounce the throne 1706, returned as monarch 1709 until his death. He also served as regent on behalf of Dukes Christian Maurice, and Maurice Wilhelm in Saxe-Merseburg.
Regencies of Erdmuthe Dorothea of Saxe-Zeitz and Frederick Augustus I, Elector of Saxony (1694-1712)						Both brothers left no descendants. Maurice William was succeeded by his uncle, Henry.
Christian III Maurice	7 November 1680	1694	14 November 1694	Albertine; Saxe-Merseburg	Unmarried	Both brothers left no descendants. Maurice William was succeeded by his uncle, Henry.
Maurice William	5 February 1688	1694–1731	21 April 1731	Albertine; Saxe-Merseburg	Henriette Charlotte of Nassau-Idstein; 4 November 1711; Istein one child	Both brothers left no descendants. Maurice William was succeeded by his uncle, Henry.
Henry	2 September 1661	1694–1731	28 July 1738	Albertine; Saxe-Merseburg-Spremberg	Elisabeth of Mecklenburg-Güstrow; 29 March 1692; Güstrow three children	Son of Christian. Received from his brother the town of Spremberg. In 1731 succeeded in Saxe-Merseburg, reuniting its original lands with those he unexpectedly inherited. Left no descendants and Saxe-Merseburg merged in the Electorate of Saxony.
Henry	2 September 1661	1731–1738	28 July 1738	Albertine; Saxe-Merseburg	Elisabeth of Mecklenburg-Güstrow; 29 March 1692; Güstrow three children	Son of Christian. Received from his brother the town of Spremberg. In 1731 succeeded in Saxe-Merseburg, reuniting its original lands with those he unexpectedly inherited. Left no descendants and Saxe-Merseburg merged in the Electorate of Saxony.
Saxe-Merseburg-Spremberg merged in Saxe-Merseburg
Saxe-Merseburg merged in the Electorate of Saxony
John George	13 July 1677	1697–1712	16 March 1712	Albertine; Saxe-Weissenfels-Querfurt	Fredericka Elisabeth of Saxe-Eisenach; 7 January 1698; Jena seven children	Left no male descendants. He was succeeded by his brother Christian.
John William III	17 October 1666	1698–1729	14 January 1729	Ernestine; Saxe-Eisenach	Amalie of Nassau-Dietz; 28 November 1690; Oranjewoud two children Christine Juliane of Baden-Durlach; 27 February 1697; Wolfenbüttel seven children Magdalene Sibylle of Saxe-Weissenfels; 28 July 1708; Weissenfels three children Marie Christine Felizitas of Leiningen-Dagsburg-Falkenburg-Heidesheim; 29 May 1727; Hanau no children	
Frederick Henry	21 July 1668	1699–1713	18 December 1713	Albertine; Saxe-Zeitz-Pegau-Neustadt	Sophie Angelika of Württemberg-Oels; 23 April 1699; Oleśnica no children Anna Fredericka Philippine of Schleswig-Holstein-Sonderburg-Wiesenburg; 27 February 1702; Moritzburg two children	Son of Maurice. Received from his brother the towns of Pegau and Neustadt. Left no male descendants. His lands returned to Saxe-Zeitz.
Saxe-Zeitz-Pegau-Neustadt merged in Saxe-Zeitz
Ernest Louis I	7 October 1672	1706–1724	24 November 1724	Ernestine; Saxe-Meiningen	Dorothea Marie of Saxe-Gotha-Altenburg; 19 September 1704; Gotha five children Elisabeth Sophie of Brandenburg; 3 June 1714; Coburg no children	
Frederick	20 November 1673	1711–1715	16 April 1715	Albertine; Saxe-Weissenfels-Dahme	Emilie Agnes Reuss of Schleiz; 13 February 1711; Dahme no children	Son of Augustus. His brother John Adolph gave him in 1711 Saxe-Weissenfels-Dahme. After his death Dahme was reabsorbed by Saxe-Weissenfels-Querfurt.
Saxe-Weissenfels-Dahme merged in Saxe-Weissenfels-Querfurt
Christian	23 February 1682	1712–1736	28 June 1736	Albertine; Saxe-Weissenfels-Querfurt	Louise Christine of Stolberg-Stolberg-Ortenberg; 12 May 1712; Stolberg no children	Left no male descendants. He was succeeded by his brother John Adolf.
Ernest Frederick I	21 August 1681	1715–1724	9 March 1724	Ernestine; Saxe-Hildburghausen	Sophia Albertine of Erbach-Erbach; 4 February 1704; Erbach im Odenwald fourteen children	
Ernest Louis II	8 August 1709	1724–1729	24 February 1729	Ernestine; Saxe-Meiningen	Unmarried	Left no descendants. He was succeeded by his brother.
Regency of Sophia Albertine of Erbach-Erbach (1724-1728)						
Ernest Frederick II	17 December 1707	1724–1745	13 August 1745	Ernestine; Saxe-Hildburghausen	Caroline of Erbach-Fürstenau; 19 June 1726; Fürstenau four children	
George Albert	19 April 1695	1728–1739	12 June 1739	Albertine; Saxe-Weissenfels-Barby	Auguste Louise of Württemberg-Oels; 18 February 1721; Forst no children	Left no descendants, and his land merged in Saxe-Weissenfels.
Saxe-Weissenfels-Barby merged in Saxe-Weissenfels
William Henry	10 November 1691	1729–1741	26 July 1741	Ernestine; Saxe-Eisenach	Albertine Juliane of Nassau-Idstein; 15 February 1713; Idstein no children Anna Sophie Charlotte of Brandenburg-Schwedt; 3 June 1723; Berlin no children	Left no descendants: Saxe-Eisenach merged with Saxe-Weimar.
Saxe-Eisenach merged in Saxe-Weimar to form Saxe-Weimar-Eisenach
Ernest Augustus I	19 April 1688	1728–1741	19 January 1748	Ernestine; Saxe-Weimar	Eleonore Wilhelmine of Anhalt-Köthen; 2 November 1683; Nienburg eight children Sophie Charlotte of Brandenburg-Bayreuth; 7 April 1734; Bayreuth four children	Son of John Ernest III. Reunited under his rule the duchies of Saxe-Weimar and Eisenach.
Ernest Augustus I	19 April 1688	1741–1748	19 January 1748	Ernestine; Saxe-Weimar-Eisenach	Eleonore Wilhelmine of Anhalt-Köthen; 2 November 1683; Nienburg eight children Sophie Charlotte of Brandenburg-Bayreuth; 7 April 1734; Bayreuth four children	Son of John Ernest III. Reunited under his rule the duchies of Saxe-Weimar and Eisenach.
Christian Ernest	18 August 1683	1729–1745	4 September 1745	Ernestine; Saxe-Coburg-Saalfeld	Christiane Fredericka of Koss; 18 August 1724; Naitschau (morganatic) no children	Left no descendants. He was succeeded by his brother.
Charles Frederick I	18 July 1712	1729–1743	28 March 1743	Ernestine; Saxe-Meiningen	Unmarried	Brother of Ernest Louis II. Left no descendants. He was succeeded by his uncle.
Frederick III	14 April 1699	1732–1772	10 March 1772	Ernestine; Saxe-Gotha-Altenburg	Luise Dorothea of Saxe-Meiningen; 17 September 1729; Gotha eight children	He also served as regent for Duke Ernest Augustus II of Saxe-Weimar-Eisenach.
Frederick Augustus II the Fat (Friedrich August II)	17 October 1696	1 February 1733 – 5 October 1763	5 October 1763	Albertine; Electorate of Saxony	Maria Josepha of Austria; 20 August 1719; Dresden sixteen children	Son of Frederick Augustus I. Converted to Catholicism 1712. King of Poland 1734–1763.
John Adolph II	4 September 1685	1736–1746	16 May 1746	Albertine; Saxe-Weissenfels-Querfurt	Johannette Antoinette Juliane of Saxe-Eisenach; 9 May 1721; Eisenach one child Fredericka of Saxe-Gotha-Altenburg; 27 November 1734; Altenburg five children	Left no male descendants. After his death the Duchy was reannexed by the Electorate of Saxony.
Saxe-Weissenfels-Querfurt merged in the Electorate of Saxony
Frederick William IV	16 February 1679	1743–1746	10 March 1746	Ernestine; Saxe-Meiningen	Unmarried	Brother of Ernest Louis I. Left no descendants. He was succeeded by his half-brother.
Regency of Caroline of Erbach-Fürstenau (1745-1748)						
Ernest Frederick III	10 June 1727	1745–1780	23 September 1780	Ernestine; Saxe-Hildburghausen	Louise of Denmark; 1 October 1749; Copenhagen one child Christiane Sophie Charlotte of Brandenburg-Bayreuth; 20 January 1757; Copenhagen one child Ernestine of Saxe-Weimar; 1 July 1758; Bayreuth three children	
Francis Josias	25 September 1697	1745–1764	16 September 1764	Ernestine; Saxe-Coburg-Saalfeld	Anna Sophie of Schwarzburg-Rudolstadt; 2 January 1723; Rudolstadt eight children	Brother of Christian Ernest. He also served as regent for Duke Ernest Augustus II of Saxe-Weimar-Eisenach.
Anthony Ulrich	22 October 1687	1746–1763	27 January 1763	Ernestine; Saxe-Meiningen	Philippine Elisabeth Caesar; January 1711 morganatic ten children Charlotte Amalie of Hesse-Philippsthal; 26 September 1750; Bad Homburg vor der Höhe eight children	
Regency of Francis Josias, Duke of Saxe-Coburg-Saalfeld (1748-1755)						
Ernest Augustus II	2 June 1737	1748–1758	28 May 1758	Ernestine; Saxe-Weimar-Eisenach	Anna Amalia of Brunswick-Wolfenbüttel; 16 March 1756; Brunswick two children	
Regency of Anna Amalia of Brunswick-Wolfenbüttel (1758-1775)						In 1815 his rank of Duke was elevated to Grand Duke; from 1815 Saxe-Weimar-Eisenach becomes a Grand Duchy.
Charles Augustus	3 September 1757	1758–1828	14 June 1828	Ernestine; Saxe-Weimar-Eisenach	Louise of Hesse-Darmstadt; 3 October 1775; Karlsruhe seven children	In 1815 his rank of Duke was elevated to Grand Duke; from 1815 Saxe-Weimar-Eisenach becomes a Grand Duchy.
Frederick Christian (Friedrich Christian)	5 September 1722	5 October 1763 – 17 December 1763	17 December 1763	Albertine; Electorate of Saxony	Maria Antonia of Bavaria; 13 June 1747; Munich (by proxy); 20 June 1747; Dresden (in person) nine children	Son of Frederick Augustus II, raised Catholic.
Regency of Charlotte Amalie of Hesse-Philippsthal (1763-1779)						Left no descendants. He was succeeded by his brother.
Charles William	19 November 1754	1763–1782	21 January 1782	Ernestine; Saxe-Meiningen	Louise of Stolberg-Gedern; 5 June 1780; Gedern no children	Left no descendants. He was succeeded by his brother.
Regency of Maria Antonia of Bavaria (1763-1768)						Son of Frederick Christian. His Electorate ceased with the fall of the Holy Roman Empire in 1806, and he became King of Saxony.
Frederick Augustus III the Just (Friedrich August III)	23 December 1750	17 December 1763 – 20 December 1806	5 May 1827	Albertine; Electorate of Saxony	Amalie of Zweibrücken-Birkenfeld; 17 January 1769; Mannheim (by proxy); 29 January 1769; Dresden (in person) four children	Son of Frederick Christian. His Electorate ceased with the fall of the Holy Roman Empire in 1806, and he became King of Saxony.
In 1806 The Elector of Saxony became King of an independent Kingdom of Saxony. For the Kings that followed the electors, see below the Kingdom of Saxony. To continue the list of the multiple duchies that were contemporaries of this kingdom, follow this table.
Ernest Frederick	8 March 1724	1764–1800	8 September 1800	Ernestine; Saxe-Coburg-Saalfeld	Sophie Antoinette of Brunswick-Wolfenbüttel; 23 April 1749; Wolfenbüttel seven children	
Ernest II	30 January 1745	1772–1804	20 April 1804	Ernestine; Saxe-Gotha-Altenburg	Charlotte of Saxe-Meiningen; 21 March 1769; Meiningen four children	
George I	4 February 1761	1782–1803	24 December 1803	Ernestine; Saxe-Meiningen	Louise Eleonore of Hohenlohe-Langenburg; 27 November 1782; Langenburg four children	
Francis	15 July 1750	1800–1806	9 December 1806	Ernestine; Saxe-Coburg-Saalfeld	Sophie of Saxe-Hildburghausen; 6 March 1776; Hildburghausen no children Augusta Reuss of Ebersdorf; 13 June 1777; Ebersdorf ten children	
Regency of Louise Eleonore of Hohenlohe-Langenburg (1803-1821)						
Bernard II	17 December 1800	1803–1866	3 December 1882	Ernestine; Saxe-Meiningen	Marie Frederica of Hesse-Kassel; 23 March 1825; Kassel two children	
Augustus	23 November 1772	1804–1822	17 May 1822	Ernestine; Saxe-Gotha-Altenburg	Louise Charlotte of Mecklenburg-Schwerin; 21 October 1797; Ludwigslust one child Karoline Amalie of Hesse-Kassel; 24 April 1802; Kassel no children	Left no male descendants. The land was inherited by his brother Frederick
Ernest I	2 January 1784	1806–1844	29 January 1844	Ernestine; Saxe-Coburg-Saalfeld (1800-1826) Ernestine; Saxe-Coburg and Gotha (1826-1844)	Louise of Saxe-Gotha-Altenburg; 3 July 1817; Gotha two children Marie of Württemberg; 23 December 1832; Coburg no children	Inherited Gotha from Frederick IX, but had to cede Saafeld to Saxe-Meiningen. The duchy changed its name to Saxe-Coburg and Gotha
Frederick IV	28 November 1774	1822–1825	11 February 1825	Ernestine; Saxe-Gotha-Altenburg	Unmarried	Brother of Augustus. Left no male descendants. The land was divided between Saxe-Coburg-Saalfeld and Saxe-Hildburghausen.
Saxe-Gotha-Altenburg divided between its neighbours Saxe-Coburg-Saalfeld and Saxe-Hildburghausen
Regency of Prince Joseph of Saxe-Hildburghausen (1780-1787)						Inherited Altenburg from Frederick IV, merging it with Hildburghausen. However, Frederick changed the name of the united duchy Saxe-Altenburg.
Frederick	29 April 1763	1780–1834	29 September 1834	Ernestine; Saxe-Hildburghausen (1787-1826) Ernestine; Saxe-Altenburg (1826–1834)	Charlotte Georgine of Mecklenburg-Strelitz; 3 September 1785; Hildburghausen twelve children	Inherited Altenburg from Frederick IV, merging it with Hildburghausen. However, Frederick changed the name of the united duchy Saxe-Altenburg.
Charles Frederick	2 February 1783	1828–1853	8 July 1853	Ernestine; Saxe-Weimar-Eisenach	Maria Pavlovna of Russia; 3 August 1804; St. Petersburg four children	
Joseph	27 August 1789	1834–1848	25 November 1868	Ernestine; Saxe-Altenburg	Amelia of Württemberg; 24 April 1817; Kirchheim unter Teck six children	He implemented several buildings in Altenburg, but his government was considered conservative and resistant to reform; for this, he was forced to abdicate during the civil revolution of 1848. Left no male descendants. He was succeeded by his brother George.
Ernest II	21 June 1818	1844–1893	22 August 1893	Ernestine; Saxe-Coburg and Gotha	Alexandrine of Baden; 3 May 1842; Karlsruhe no children	Left no descendants. He was succeeded by his nephews.
George	24 July 1796	1848–1853	3 August 1853	Ernestine; Saxe-Altenburg	Marie Louise of Mecklenburg-Schwerin; 7 October 1825; Ludwigslust three children	Brother of Joseph.
Charles Alexander	24 June 1818	1853–1901	5 January 1901	Ernestine; Saxe-Weimar-Eisenach	Sophie of the Netherlands; 8 October 1842; The Hague four children	
Ernest I	16 February 1826	1853–1908	7 February 1908	Ernestine; Saxe-Altenburg	Agnes of Anhalt-Dessau; 28 April 1853; Ludwigslust two children	Left no male descendants. He was succeeded by his nephew.
George II	2 April 1826	1866–1914	25 June 1914	Ernestine; Saxe-Meiningen	Charlotte of Prussia; 18 May 1850; Berlin four children Feodora of Hohenlohe-Langenburg; 23 October 1858; Langenburg three children Ellen Franz; 18 March 1873; Liebenstein (morganatic) no children	
Alfred	6 August 1844	1893–1900	30 July 1900	Ernestine; Saxe-Coburg and Gotha	Maria Alexandrovna of Russia; 23 January 1874; St Petersburg six children	Son of Prince Albert of Saxe-Coburg and Gotha and Queen Victoria. Nephew of Ernest II.
Regency of Prince Ernst of Hohenlohe-Langenburg (1900-1905)						Son of Prince Leopold, Duke of Albany; Nephew of Alfred. Monarchy abolished in 1918.
Charles Edward	19 July 1884	1900–1918	6 March 1954	Ernestine; Saxe-Coburg and Gotha	Victoria Adelaide of Schleswig-Holstein; 11 October 1905; Schleswig five children	Son of Prince Leopold, Duke of Albany; Nephew of Alfred. Monarchy abolished in 1918.
William Ernest	10 June 1876	1901–1918	24 April 1923	Ernestine; Saxe-Weimar-Eisenach	Caroline Reuss of Greiz; 30 April 1903; Bückeburg no children Feodora of Saxe-Meiningen; 14 January 1910; Meiningen four children	Grandson of Charles Alexander, as son of Charles Augustus, Hereditary Grand Duke of Saxe-Weimar-Eisenach. Monarchy abolished in 1918.
Ernest II	31 August 1871	1908–1918	22 March 1955	Ernestine; Saxe-Altenburg	Adelaide of Schaumburg-Lippe; 17 February 1898; Bückeburg (annulled 1920) four children Maria Triebel; 15 July 1934; Trockenborn-Wolfersdorf (morganatic) no children	Grandson of George III, as son of Prince Moritz of Saxe-Altenburg. Monarchy abolished in 1918.
Bernard III	1 April 1851	1914–1918	16 January 1928	Ernestine; Saxe-Meiningen	Charlotte of Prussia; 18 February 1878; Berlin two children	Monarchy abolished in 1918.

== Kingdom of Saxony ==
Royal Standard of the King of Saxony (1806–1918)

The Holy Roman Empire came to an end in 1806. The Elector of Saxony, allied to Napoleon, anticipated its dissolution by becoming the ruler of an independent Kingdom of Saxony in 1806.

Ruler	Born	Reign	Death	Ruling part	Consort	Notes
Frederick Augustus I the Just (Friedrich August I der Gerechte)	23 December 1750	20 December 1806 – 5 May 1827	5 May 1827	Kingdom of Saxony	Amalie of Zweibrücken-Birkenfeld; 17 January 1769; Mannheim (by proxy); 29 January 1769; Dresden (in person) four children	In 1806 became king of the newly independent Kingdom of Saxony. Also Duke of Warsaw 1807–1813. Left no male descendants. He was succeeded by his brother. (The numbering resets in this point).
Anthony the Kind (Anton der Gütige)	27 December 1755	5 May 1827 – 6 June 1836	6 June 1836	Kingdom of Saxony	Maria Carolina of Savoy; 29 September 1781; Stupinigi (by proxy); 24 October 1781; Dresden (in person) no children Maria Theresa of Austria; 8 September 1787; Florence (by proxy); 18 October 1787; Dresden (in person) four children	Left no male descendants. He was succeeded by his nephew.
Frederick Augustus II (Friedrich August II)	18 May 1797	6 June 1836 – 9 August 1854	9 August 1854	Kingdom of Saxony	Maria Carolina of Austria; 26 September 1819; Vienna (by proxy); 7 October 1819; Dresden (by person) no children Maria Anna of Bavaria; 24 April 1833; Dresden no children	Son of Prince Maximilian of Saxony. Left no descendants. He was succeeded by his brother.
John (Johann I)	12 December 1801	9 August 1854 – 29 October 1873	29 October 1873	Kingdom of Saxony	Amalie Auguste of Bavaria; 10 November 1822; Munich (by proxy); 21 November 1822; Dresden (in person) nine children	Became a subordinate ruler in the German Empire after the Unification of Germany in 1871.
Albert the Good (Albrecht der Gute)	23 April 1828	29 October 1873 – 19 June 1902	19 June 1902	Kingdom of Saxony	Carola of Sweden; 18 June 1853; Dresden no children	
George (Georg)	8 August 1832	19 June 1902 – 15 October 1904	15 October 1904	Kingdom of Saxony	Maria Anna of Portugal; 11 May 1859; Lisbon eight children	
Frederick Augustus III (Friedrich August III)	25 May 1865	15 October 1904 – 13 November 1918	18 February 1932	Kingdom of Saxony	Louise of Austria; 21 November 1891; Vienna (annulled by royal decree in 1903, after her escape from court) seven children	The last King of Saxony. Abdicated voluntarily in the German Revolution of 1918–1919.

== Free state of Saxony ==
For heads of government of Saxony since 1918, see List of minister-presidents of Saxony. For heads of state, see List of presidents of Germany.

== See also ==
- Coat of arms of Saxony
- History of Saxony
