= Anna Margaret of Hesse-Homburg =

- Born: 31 August 1629; Homburg
- Died: 3 August 1686 (aged 56); Oberkotzau
- Spouse: Philip Louis, Duke of Schleswig-Holstein-Sonderburg-Wiesenburg
- House: House of Hesse
- Father: Frederick I, Landgrave of Hesse-Homburg
- Mother: Margaret Elisabeth of Leiningen-Westerburg

Anna Margaret of Hesse-Homburg, (31 August 1629 in Homburg – 3 August 1686 in Oberkotzau), was a Landgravine of Hesse-Homburg by birth and by marriage Duchess of Schleswig-Holstein-Sonderburg-Wiesenburg.

== Life ==
Anna Margaret was the only daughter of Landgrave Frederick I of Hesse-Homburg (1585–1638) from his marriage to Margaret Elizabeth (1604–1667), the daughter of Count Christopher of Leiningen-Westerburg.

She married Duke Philip Louis of Holstein-Wiesenburg (1620–1689) on 5 May 1650, in Homburg. Her husband purchased Wiesenburg Castle and the associated Lordship in 1663.

From 1659, she employed her goddaughter Johanna Eleonora von Merlau. Johanna Eleonora would later marry Johann Wilhelm Petersen and formulate a radical form of pietism. At court, Johanna Eleonora met Philipp Jacob Spener and Johann Jakob Schütz and developed a deep friendship with Anna Margaret's daughter Sophie Elisabeth.

== Issue ==
From her marriage Anna Margaret had the following children:

- Frederick, Duke of Schleswig-Holstein-Sonderburg-Wiesenburg (1651–1724)

married in 1672 to Duchess Charlotte of Legnica (1652–1707), divorced in 1680

- George William (1652–1652)
- Sophie Elisabeth (1653–1684)

married in 1676 to Duke Maurice of Saxe-Zeitz (1619–1681)

- Charles Louis (1654–1690)
- Eleanor Margaret (1655–1702)

married in 1674 to Prince Maximilian II von und zu Liechtenstein (1641–1709)

- Christine Amalie (1656–1666)
- Anna Wilhelmina (1657–1657)
- John George (1658–1658)
- Leopold George (1660–1660)
- William Christian (1661–1711)
- Friederike Louise (1662–1663)
- Sophie Magdalene (1664–1720)
- Anna Friederike Philippine (1665–1748)

married in 1702 to Duke Frederick Henry of Saxe-Zeitz-Pegau-Neustadt (1668–1713)

- Unnamed child (1666–1666)
- Johanna Magdalene Louise (1668–1732)
