= Maurice of Saxony (disambiguation) =

Maurice of Saxony (German: Moritz von Sachsen) is the name of:

- Maurice, Elector of Saxony (1521–1553)
- Maurice, Duke of Saxe-Lauenburg (1551–1612)
- Maurice, Duke of Saxe-Zeitz (1619–1681)
- Moritz Wilhelm, Duke of Saxe-Zeitz (1664–1718)
- Maurice Wilhelm, Duke of Saxe-Merseburg (1688–1731)
- Maurice de Saxe (1696–1750), Marshal General of France
- Prince Moritz of Saxe-Altenburg (1829–1907)
