= Margaret Elisabeth of Leiningen-Westerburg =

- Born: 30 June 1604; Schadeck, today part of Runkel
- Died: 13 August 1667 (aged 63); Wiesenburg Castle
- Noble family: House of Leiningen
- Spouse: Frederick I, Landgrave of Hesse-Homburg (m. 1622; died 1638)
- Father: Christopher of Leiningen-Westerburg
- Mother: Anna Maria Ungnad, Baroness of Weissenwolff

Margaret Elisabeth of Leiningen-Westerburg (30 June 1604 in Schadeck, today part of Runkel – 13 August 1667 at Wiesenburg Castle), was a Countess of Leiningen and regent of the Landgraviate of Hesse-Homburg during the minority of her sons from 1638.

== Life ==
Margaret Elizabeth was the only child from the first marriage of Count Christopher of Leiningen-Westerburg (1575-1635) and Anna Maria Ungnad, Baroness of Weissenwolff (1573-1606). She married on 10 August 1622 at Butzbach to Landgrave Frederick I of Hesse-Homburg. After Margaret Elizabeth had given birth to her second son, primogeniture was introduced in the landgraviate.

After the death of her husband on 9 May 1638, she led the regency for her infant sons. Her youngest son was Frederick II of Hesse-Homburg, the famous Prince of Homburg.

== Issue ==
Margaret Elisabeth and Frederick I had the following children:

- Louis Philippe (1623–1643)
- George (1624–1624)
- William Christoph (1625–1681), Landgrave of Hesse-Homburg

married firstly in 1650 Princess Sophia Eleonore of Hesse-Darmstadt (1634–1663)
married secondly in 1665 Princess Anna Elisabeth of Saxe-Lauenburg (1624–1688)

- George Christian (1626–1677)

married in 1666 Anna Catherine of Pogwisch, widow of von Ahlefeldt (1633–1694)

- Anna Margaret (1629–1686)

married in 1650 Duke Philip Louis of Schleswig-Holstein-Sonderburg-Wiesenburg (1620–1689)

- Frederick II (1633–1708), Landgrave of Hesse-Homburg, better known as The Prince of Homburg

married firstly in 1661 Countess Margareta Brahe, widow of Oxenstierna (1603–1669)
married secondly in 1670 Princess Louise Elisabeth of Courland (1646–1690)
married thirdly in 1691 Countess Sophia Sibylle of Leiningen-Westerburg, widow of the Count of Leiningen-Dagsburg (1656–1724)
