= Sophie Elisabeth of Schleswig-Holstein-Sonderburg-Wiesenburg =

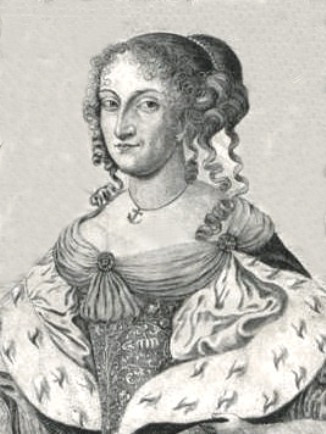

Duchess consort of Saxe-Zeitz
- Tenure: 1676-1681
- Born: 4 May 1653; Homburg vor der Höhe
- Died: 19 August 1684 (aged 31); Schleusingen
- Spouse: Maurice, Duke of Saxe-Zeitz
- House: Oldenburg
- Father: Philip Louis, Duke of Schleswig-Holstein-Sonderburg-Wiesenburg
- Mother: Anna Margaret of Hesse-Homburg

Sophie Elisabeth of Schleswig-Holstein-Sonderburg-Wiesenburg (4 May 1653 - 19 August 1684), was a German noblewoman member of the House of Oldenburg, and by marriage Duchess of Saxe-Zeitz.

Born in Homburg vor der Höhe, she was the third of fifteen children born from the second marriage of Philip Louis, Duke of Schleswig-Holstein-Sonderburg-Wiesenburg with Anna Margaret of Hesse-Homburg. From her fourteen full siblings, only seven survived to adulthood: Frederick, Charles Louis, Eleanor Margaret (by marriage Princess of Liechtenstein), William Christian, Sophie Magdalene (Abbess in Quedlinburg), Anna Fredericka Philippine (by marriage Duchess of Saxe-Zeitz-Pegau-Neustadt) and Johanna Magdalene Louise. In addition, she had two further older half-siblings from her father's first marriage with Catharina of Waldeck-Wildungen, of whom only one survived: Dorothea Elisabeth (by her two marriages Countess of Sinzendorf, Rabutin and Marchioness de Fremonville).

== Life ==
In Wiesenburg on 14 June 1676, Sophie Elisabeth married Maurice, Duke of Saxe-Zeitz as his third wife. They had no children.

Sophie Elisabeth died in Schleusingen, aged 31. She was buried in the Hallenkrypta of the Dom St.Peter und Paul, Zeitz.

Sophie Elisabeth of Schleswig-Holstein-Sonderburg-Wiesenburg House of Oldenburg Born: 4 May 1653 Died: 19 August 1684
German royalty
Vacant Title last held by Dorothea Maria of Saxe-Weimar	Duchess consort of Saxe-Zeitz; 1676–1681	Vacant Title next held by Marie Amalie of Brandenburg
