= Sophie Angelika of Württemberg-Oels =

Duchess consort of Saxe-Zeitz-Pegau-Neustadt
- Tenure: 1699-1700
- Born: 30 May 1677; Bernstadt
- Died: 11 November 1700 (aged 23); Pegau
- Spouse: Frederick Henry, Duke of Saxe-Zeitz-Pegau-Neustadt
- House: Württemberg
- Father: Christian Ulrich I, Duke of Württemberg-Oels
- Mother: Anna Elisabeth of Anhalt-Bernburg

Sophie Angelika of Württemberg-Oels (30 May 1677 - 11 November 1700), was a Duchess of Württemberg-Oels by birth and by marriage She became the Duchess of Saxe-Zeitz-Pegau-Neustadt.

== Early life ==
Born in Bernstadt (now called Bierutów), the capital of the Duchy of Bernstadt in Silesia, she was the fifth of the seven children of Duke Christian Ulrich I of Württemberg-Oels and his first wife, Anna Elisabeth, a daughter of Prince Christian II of Anhalt-Bernburg and Eleonore Sophie of Schleswig-Holstein-Sonderburg.

== Biography ==
Her mother died after complications in her last childbirth on 3 September 1680 and her father remarried three more times: in Doberlug on 27 October 1683 to Sibylle Maria, a daughter of Duke Christian I of Saxe-Merseburg; in Hamburg on 4 February 1695 to Sophie Wilhelmine, a daughter of Prince Enno Louis Cirksena of East Frisia and in Güstrow on 6 December 1700 with Sophia, a daughter of Duke Gustav Adolph of Mecklenburg-Güstrow. Sophie Angelika and her older sister Louise Elisabeth (by marriage Duchess of Saxe-Merseburg-Lauchstädt) are the only surviving children from her parents' marriage. From her father's later marriages she had eight half-siblings, of whom only three survive adulthood: Charles Frederick II, Duke of Württemberg-Oels, Christian Ulrich II, Duke of Württemberg-Wilhelminenort (both sons of Sibylle Maria) and Auguste Louise (daughter of Sophie Wilhelmine; by marriage Duchess of Saxe-Weissenfels-Barby).

== Private life ==
In Öls on 23 April 1699, Sophie Angelika married Prince Frederick Henry of Saxe-Zeitz. Shortly after, he received from his older brother Maurice Wilhelm, Duke of Saxe-Zeitz, the towns of Pegau and Neustadt as appanage. From then on, Frederick Henry assumed the title Duke of Saxe-Zeitz-Pegau-Neustadt (Herzog von Sachsen-Zeitz-Pegau-Neustadt).

Sophie Angelika and her husband settled their residence in Pegau, where she died aged 23 after only nineteen months of childless union. She was buried in the Hallenkrypta of the Dom St.Peter und Paul, Zeitz.

Sophie Angelika of Württemberg-Oels House of Württemberg Born: 30 May 1677 Died: 11 November 1700
German royalty
New creation	Duchess consort of Saxe-Zeitz-Pegau-Neustadt; 1699–1700	Vacant Title next held by Anna Fredericka Philippine of Schleswig-Holstein-Sonderburg-Wiesenburg
