= Frederick I of Hesse-Homburg =

Landgrave of Hesse-Homburg

Frederick I
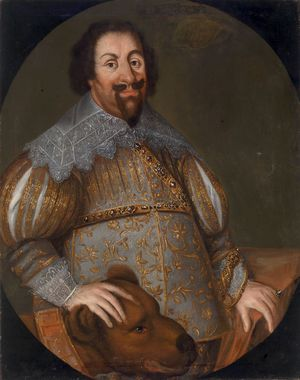
- Born: 5 March 1585; Lichtenberg Castle in Fischbachtal
- Died: 9 May 1638 (aged 53); Bad Homburg
- Spouse: Margaret Elisabeth of Leiningen-Westerburg (m. 1622)
- House: House of Hesse
- Father: George I, Landgrave of Hesse-Darmstadt
- Mother: Magdalene of Lippe

Frederick I of Hesse-Homburg (5 March 1585, at Lichtenberg Castle in Fischbachtal – 9 May 1638, in Bad Homburg), was the first Landgrave of Hesse-Homburg and founder of the eponymous family line.

== Life ==
Frederick was the youngest son of Count George I of Hesse-Darmstadt from his first marriage to Magdalene, daughter of Count VIII Bernhard of Lippe.

Frederick did not have any rights to inherit, because in Hesse-Darmstadt primogeniture had been introduced properly. Nevertheless, Frederick received in 1622 an apanage consisting of the City and district of Homburg, as well as a one-off payment plus an annual sum. He was not considered a sovereign prince, but fell under the sovereignty of Hesse-Darmstadt. In 1626, he introduced primogeniture in Hesse-Homburg.

One of his sons was Frederick II of Hesse-Homburg, better known as The Prince of Homburg.

== Marriage and issue ==
Frederick I married on 10 August 1622 in Butzbach with Margaret Elisabeth, daughter of Count Christopher of Leiningen-Westerburg. They had the following children:

- Louis Philippe ( 22 December, 1623 – 26 August, 1643) Never married or had issue.
- George ( 2 March, 1624 – 2 March, 1624) Died young
- William Christoph (1625–1681), Landgrave of Hesse-Homburg

married firstly in 1650 Princess Sophia Eleonore of Hesse-Darmstadt (1634–1663)
married secondly in 1665 Princess Anna Elisabeth of Saxe-Lauenburg (1624–1688)

- George Christian (1626–1677)

married in 1666 Anna Catherine of Pogwisch, widow of von Ahlefeldt (1633–1694)

- Anna Margaret (1629–1686)

married in 1650 Duke Philip Louis of Schleswig-Holstein-Sonderburg-Wiesenburg (1620–1689)

- Frederick II (1633–1708), Landgrave of Hesse-Homburg, better known as The Prince of Homburg

married firstly in 1661 Countess Margareta Brahe (1603–1669), widow of Johan Oxenstierna
married secondly in 1670 Princess Louise Elisabeth of Courland (1646–1690)
married thirdly in 1691 Countess Sophia Sibylle of Leiningen-Westerburg, widow of the Count of Leiningen-Dagsburg (1656–1724)

Frederick I of Hesse-Homburg House of Hesse Born: 5 March 1585 Died: 9 May 1638
Preceded by Louis V as Landgrave of Hesse-Darmstadt	Landgrave of Hesse-Homburg; 1622–1638	Succeeded by William Christoph
