= George Christian, Landgrave of Hesse-Homburg =

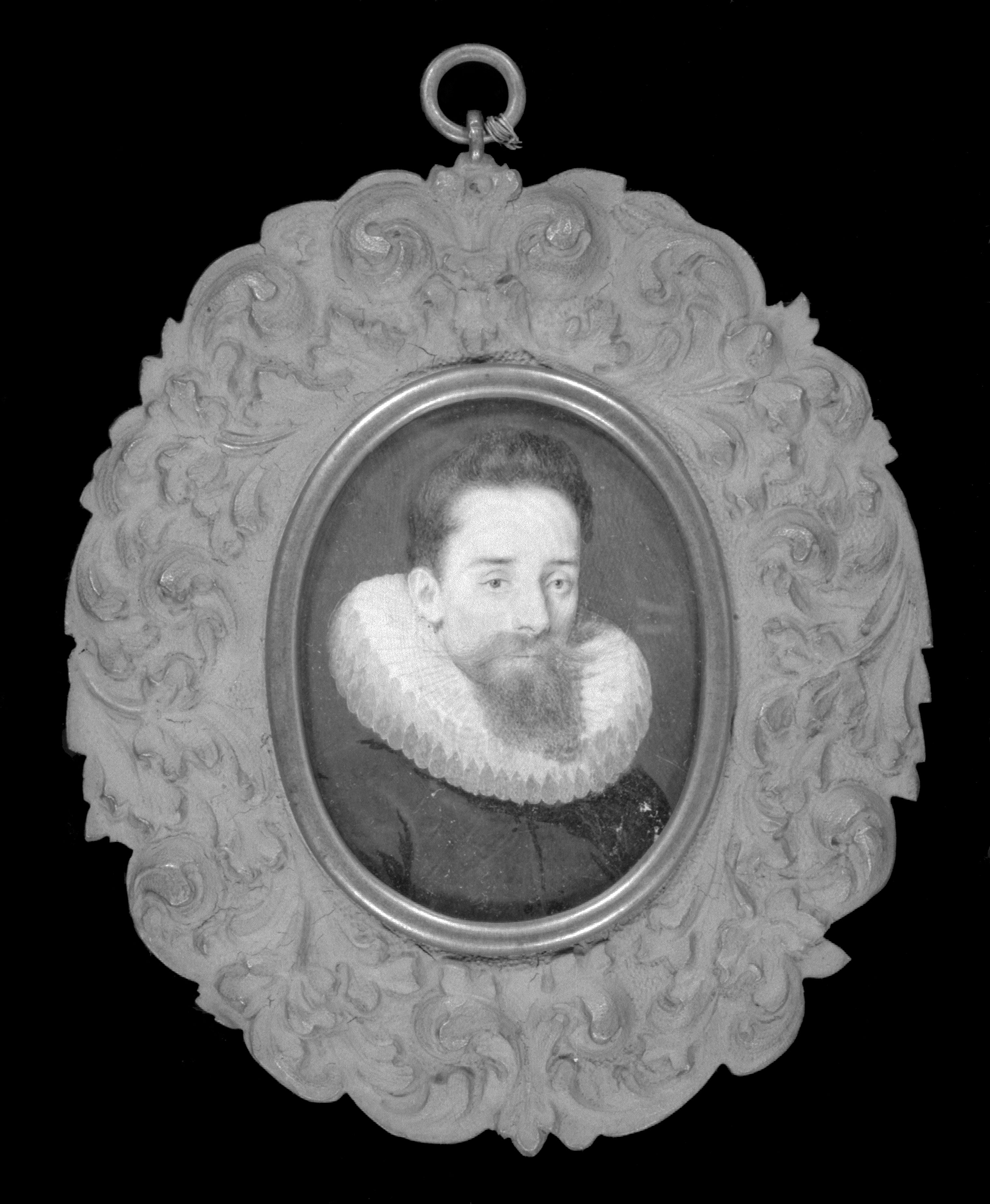
- Georg Christian von Hessen-Homburg
- Born: 10 December 1626; Homburg
- Died: 1 August 1677 (aged 50); Frankfurt
- Spouse: Anna Catharina of Pogwitsch
- House: House of Hesse
- Father: Frederick I, Landgrave of Hesse-Homburg
- Mother: Margaret Elisabeth of Leiningen-Westerburg

George Christian (10 December 1626 in Homburg – 1 August 1677 in Frankfurt) was the third Landgrave of Hesse-Homburg.

== Background ==
George Christian was the fifth child of Landgrave Frederick I born of Hesse-Homburg. After his father died in 1638, the children grew up under the tutelage of their mother, Margaret Elisabeth of Leiningen-Westerburg.

== Military and political career ==
In 1648, George Christian entered Spanish military service and remained there until 1653, most recently as "Capitan General". During this time, in 1651, he converted to Catholicism, for undocumented reasons. It is often said that a "gallant adventure" may have led to his conversion, but this alleged adventure is not documented in historical sources. It is possible that he hoped to gain better career opportunities in the Spanish army.

After he left the Spanish service, George Christian went to France, to seek his fortune in the French army. After he was promoted to Lieutenant General in 1656, he tried to raise an infantry regiment and a cavalry regiment. However, he did not succeed. He did play an important rôle, when he acted as mediator and representative of the French Cardinal Mazarin in the imperial election of 1658 and the negotiations that led to the formation of the Rhenish Alliance, also in 1658.

Around 1660, George Christian stayed in Saxony. It is not apparent from historic sources how long he stayed there. He was at the court of Duke William in Weimar. He joined the Fruitbearing Society under the nickname der Beherzte ("the Brave") and as his slogan "in the open Field". He is recorded as member number 755 in the Society's register in Köthen.

In September 1665, he served in the Netherlands as commander of the army of Bernhard von Galen, who was allied with the King of England. The military struggle for control of Borculo ended with the intervention of France and Brandenburg, to the detriment of von Galen.

== "Mad year" in Hanau ==
In 1669, he was a major participant in the "mad year" in Hanau, a dispute between the reigning Count Frederick Casimir, who was also a member of the Fruitbearing Society, and his relatives about the disastrous financial situation in Hanau and Frederick Casimir's megalomaniac projects, such as the Hanauish Indies, a projected colony of Hanau on the Orinoco river on the north coast of South America. George Christian acted as an advisor to Frederick Casimir. In an attempt to compensate for this financial disaster, Frederick Casimir was considering mortgaging the county of Hanau-Lichtenberg to the Duke of Lorraine and to convert to Roman Catholicism, in the hope of securing support from that side. Frederick Casimir sold the district of Rodheim for 9000 Taler to George Christian. George Christian then attempted to purchase the district of Dorheim, including the salt mine of Nauheim, which was very important for the economy of Hanau. In an attempt to sideline Frederick Casimir's relatives, who were opposed to selling off large parts of the county, George Christian tried to become regent of Hanau. The relatives then engaged the emergency brake and staged a coup d'état. After lengthy negotiations, Emperor Leopold I decided that Count Palatine Christian II of Zweibrücken-Birkenfeld and his sister Countess Palatine Anna Magdalena of Birkenfeld-Bischweiler, the guardians of Frederick Casimir's nephews and successors were appointed co-regent of Hanau, with the right to veto the decisions of the Count. Their position would be supported by the army of Hesse-Kassel. Frederick Casimir's advisors, including George Christian, were released from prison.

== Landgraviate of Homburg ==
Also in 1669, George Christian purchased Hesse-Homburg from his brother William Christoph. In 1671, he sold Hesse-Homburg to his largest creditors, Johann Christian von Boyneburg and the banker Johann Ochs from Frankfurt. They then sold Hesse-Homburg to Landgrave Louis VI of Hesse-Darmstadt in 1673.

== Death ==
George Christian died on 1 August 1677 in Frankfurt am Main. Unusually for a Landgrave of Hesse-Homburg, he was not buried in the crypt below the castle church in Homburg; instead he has a baroque grave near the southern entrance of the crypt below Mainz Cathedral.

== Marriage ==
On 11 October 1666 in Hamburg, George Christian married Anna Catharina of Pogwitsch (1638-1694), the widow Count Frederick of Ahlefeldt (1618-1665). The marriage does not seem to have been a happy one, because in 1668 he is found again in Homburg, while his wife remained in northern Germany.

George Christian, Landgrave of Hesse-Homburg House of Hesse Born: 10 December 1626 Died: 1 August 1677
Preceded by William Christoph	Landgrave of Hesse-Homburg; 1669-1671	Succeeded by Frederick II
