= Philip Louis, Duke of Schleswig-Holstein-Sonderburg-Wiesenburg =

17th Century Duke

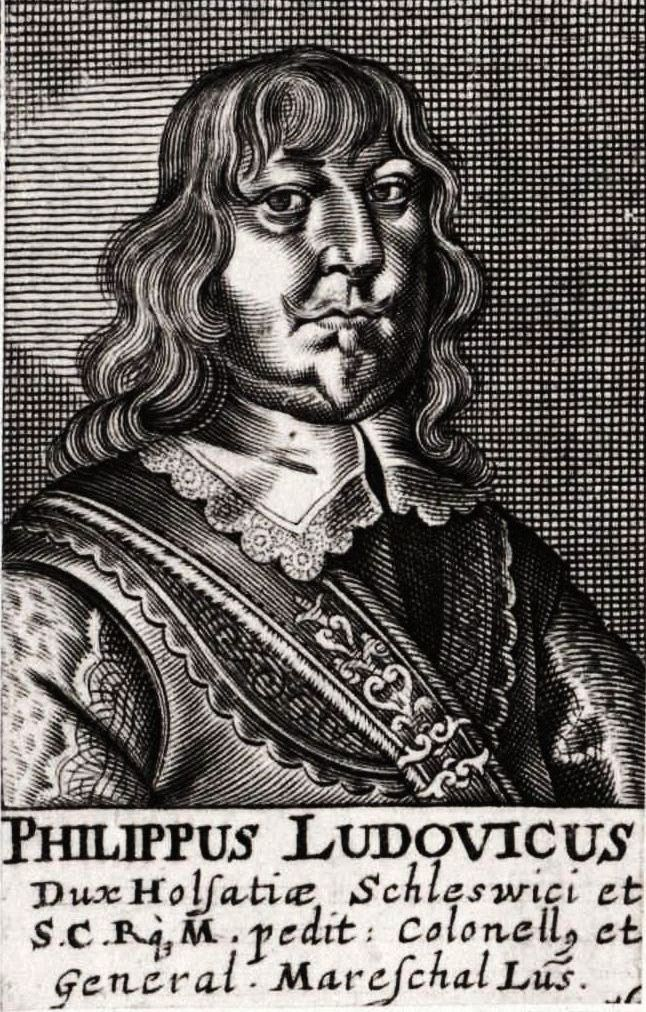
- Born: 27 October 1620; Beck
- Died: 10 March 1689 (aged 68); Schneeberg
- Noble family: House of Oldenburg
- Spouses: Catherine of Waldeck-Wildungen; Anna Margaret of Hesse-Homburg; Christine Magdalene of Reuss to Obergreiz
- Issue Detail: Sophie Elisabeth; Anna Friederike Philippine
- Father: Alexander, Duke of Schleswig-Holstein-Sonderburg
- Mother: Dorothea of Schwarzburg-Sondershausen

Philip Louis of Schleswig-Holstein-Sonderburg-Wiesenburg (born 27 October 1620 in Beck; died: 10 March 1689 in Schneeberg) was the founder and first duke of the line Schleswig-Holstein-Sonderburg-Wiesenburg. His branch of the House of Schleswig-Holstein-Sonderburg is named after Wiesenburg Castle, near Zwickau.

== Life ==
Philip Louis was the youngest son of Duke Alexander of Schleswig-Holstein-Sonderburg (1573–1627) from his marriage to Dorothea (1579–1639), daughter of Count John Günther I of Schwarzburg-Sondershausen.

Philip Louis spent his youth at various courts in Hesse. In 1663 he acquired the district of Wiesenburg, with Wiesenburg Castle and the city of Kirchberg and 20 villages from Elector John George II of Saxony, with whom he had a very good relationship. Wiesenburg Castle became his seat and gave its name to his family line.

In 1668, he appointed Johann Winckler to educate his sons at the Wiesenburg Castle. He invested in the mining industry in Schneeberg and Neustädtel. Initially, it appeared to be a failure, but in the 1670s he made large profits and became a wealthy mining entrepreneur. He had his castle thoroughly renovated.

Until 1672, Philip Louis was an imperial field marshal lieutenant in a Cuirassiers regiment. He had his castle thoroughly renovated and in 1675, he sold Wiesenburg (both the Castle and the district) for 100000Taler to his eldest son, Frederick (1651–1724). In 1686, he purchased Oberkotzau. He lived until his death on 10 March 1689 with his old friend Veit Hans Schnorr von Carolsfeld in Schneeberg.

== Marriage and issue ==
His first marriage, he completed on 15 November 1643 in Lemgo with Catherine (1612–1649), daughter of Count Christian of Waldeck-Wildungen, and widow of Simon Louis, Count of Lippe. The marriage produced two children:

- Unnamed child (1645–1645)
- Dorothea Elisabeth (1645–1725)

married firstly in 1661 Count Georg Ludwig of Sinzendorf (1616–1681)
married secondly in 1682 Count Ludwig of Rabutin (1641–1716)

He married his second wife, Anna Margaret (1629–1686), daughter of Count Frederick I of Hesse-Homburg on 5 May 1650 in Bad Homburg. With her he had the following children:

- Frederick, Duke of Schleswig-Holstein-Sonderburg-Wiesenburg (1651–1724)

married in 1672 (divorced 1680) Princess Karolina of Legnica-Brieg (1652–1707)

- George William (1652–1652)
- Sophie Elisabeth (1653–1684)

married in 1676 Duke Maurice of Saxe-Zeitz (1619–1681)

- Charles Louis (1654–1690)
- Eleanor Margaret (1655–1702)

married in 1674 Prince Maximilian II von und zu Liechtenstein (1641–1709)

- Christine Amalie (1656–1666)
- Anna Wilhelmina (1657–1657)
- Johann Georg (1658–1658)
- Leopold George (1660–1660)
- William Christian (1661–1711)
- Friederike Louise (1662–1663)
- Sophie Magdalene (1664–1720)
- Anna Friederike Philippine (1665–1748)

married in 1702 Duke Frederick Henry of Saxe-Zeitz-Pegau-Neustadt (1668-1713)

- Unnamed child (1666-1666)
- Johanne Magdalene Louise (1668–1732)

He married for the third time in Greiz on 28 July 1688 Christine Magdalene (1652–1697), daughter of Count Henry I of Reuss to Obergreiz. This marriage was childless.

== References and sources ==
- entry in Dansk biografisk leksikon (in Danish)
- Claudia Tietz: Johann Winckler (1642-1705) p. 68 ff
