= Dorothea Maria of Saxe-Weimar, Duchess of Saxe-Zeitz =

German duchess

Dorothea Maria of Saxe-Weimar
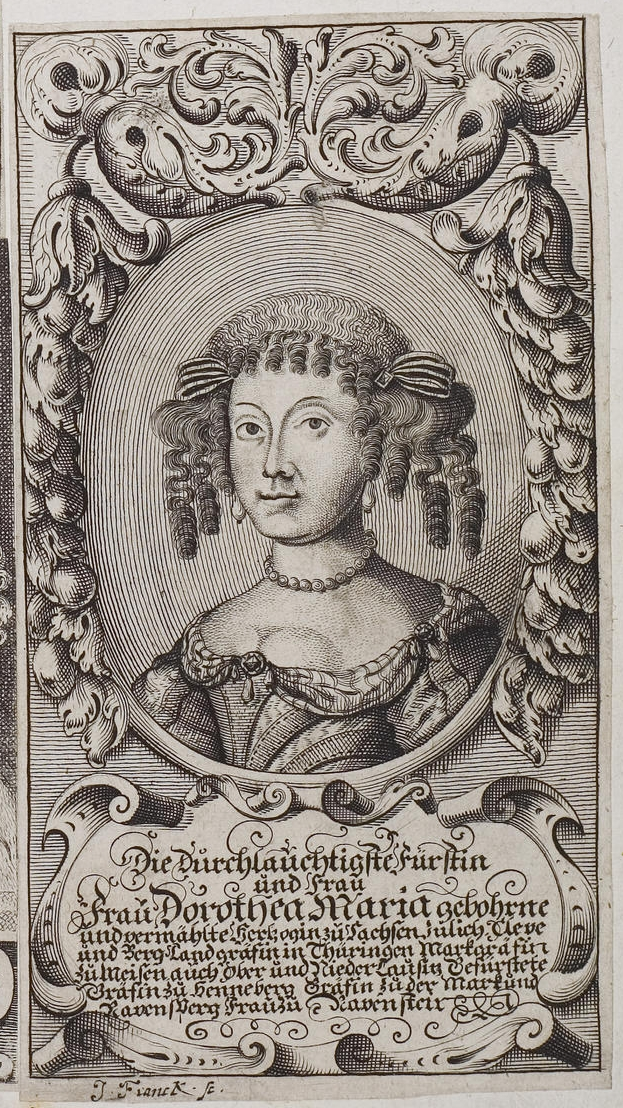

Duchess consort of Saxe-Zeitz
- Tenure: 1657–1675
- Born: 14 October 1641; Weimar
- Died: 11 June 1675 (aged 33); Moritzburg Palace in Zeitz
- Spouse: Maurice, Duke of Saxe-Zeitz
- Issue Detail: Erdmuthe Dorothea, Duchess of Saxe-Merseburg; Maurice William, Duke of Saxe-Zeitz; Prince Christian August; Frederick Henry, Duke of Saxe-Zeitz-Pegau-Neustadt
- House: Wettin
- Father: William, Duke of Saxe-Weimar
- Mother: Eleonore Dorothea of Anhalt-Dessau

Dorothea Maria of Saxe-Weimar (14 October 1641 – 11 June 1675), was by birth Duchess of Saxe-Weimar from the Ernestine branch of the House of Wettin and by marriage Duchess of Saxe-Zeitz.

== Life ==
=== Family ===
Born in Weimar, Dorothea Maria was the youngest daughter of Duke William IV of Saxe-Weimar from his marriage to Eleonore Dorothea of Anhalt-Dessau, the daughter of Prince John George I of Anhalt-Dessau. She was named after her maternal grandmother Dorothea Maria of Anhalt, who had already died at that point in time.

=== Wedding to Maurice of Saxony, and activity in the Principality of Saxe-Zeitz ===
Her marriage to Duke Maurice of Saxe-Zeitz can be understood against the background of the fact that Maurice had been administrator of the Bishopric of Naumburg-Zeitz since 1653 and lived in City Palace in Naumburg. Furthermore, Maurice had been a member since 1646, of the Fruitbearing Society, led by Dorothea Maria's father.

Maurice had been married before and had been a widower since 7 October 1652. When the customary mourning period had ended, he married Dorothea Maria, who was only 15 years old. Maurice's father, Elector John George I of Saxony died. Maurice inherited the Lordship of Zeitz as an apanage, making him the founder of the Saxe-Zeitz branch of the House of Wettin.

Maurice held that the City Palace in Naumburg was not a befitting residence for a person of his station and summoned his father court architect, Johann Moritz Richter, to discuss the design of a magnificent baroque palace, Moritzburg Palace, in his new capital Zeitz.

The Duke and Duchess saw as their main task to revive the economy and to repair the devastation of the infrastructure of their principality during the Thirty Years' War. They also devoted themselves to the reconstruction of the seminary in Zeitz. Christoph Cellarius would later add great prestige to this seminary.

Dorothea Maria died in the Moritzburg Palace, Zeitz on 11 June 1675, at the age of 33. She was buried in a magnificent sarcophagus in the hall crypt below the Cathedral of St. Peter and Paul in Zeitz. Her husband remarried after her death. This third marriage, however, remained childless, so that the Saxe-Zeitz line descends from Dorothea Maria. However, the line died out after the third generation, due to lack of male heirs.

== Marriage and issue ==
She married on 3 July 1656 in Weimar with Duke Maurice of Saxe-Zeitz, the youngest surviving son of Elector John George I of Saxony, from his second marriage, with Duchess Magdalene Sibylle of Prussia. They had ten children:

1. Eleonore Magdalene (Weimar, 30 October 1658 – Dresden, 26 February 1661).
2. Wilhelmine Eleonore (born and died Dresden, September 1659).
3. Erdmuthe Dorothea (Naumburg, 13 November 1661 – Merseburg, 29 April 1720), married on 14 October 1679 to Duke Christian II of Saxe-Merseburg.
4. Maurice William, Duke of Saxe-Zeitz (Moritzburg Palace, 12 March 1664 – d. Weida, 15 November 1718).
5. John George (Moritzburg Palace, 27 April 1665 – Moritzburg Palace, 5 September 1666).
6. Christian August (Moritzburg Palace, 9 October 1666 – d. Regensburg, 23 August 1725), Cardinal, Archbishop of Gran (Esztergom) and Primate of Hungary.
7. Frederick Henry (Moritzburg Palace, 21 July 1668 – Neustadt an der Orla, 18 December 1713), inherited Pegau and Neustadt.
8. Marie Sophie (Moritzburg Palace, 3 November 1670 – Moritzburg Palace, 31 May 1671).
9. Magdalene Sibylle (Moritzburg Palace, 7 April 1672 – Moritzburg Palace, 20 August 1672)
10. Wilhelmine Sophie (born and died Moritzburg Palace, 11 June 1675).

Dorothea Maria of Saxe-Weimar, Duchess of Saxe-Zeitz House of Wettin Born: 14 October 1641 Died: 11 June 1675
German royalty
New creation	Duchess consort of Saxe-Zeitz; 1657–1675	Vacant Title next held by Sophie Elisabeth of Schleswig-Holstein-Sonderburg-Wiesenburg
