= Anna Fredericka Philippine of Schleswig-Holstein-Sonderburg-Wiesenburg =

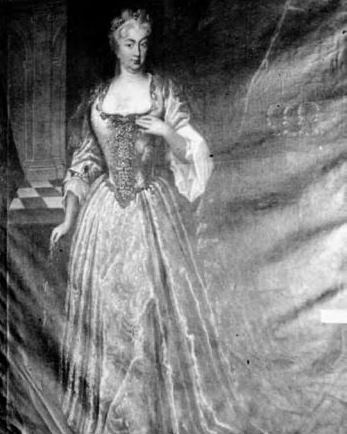

Duchess consort of Saxe-Zeitz-Pegau-Neustadt
- Tenure: 1702-1713
- Born: 4 July 1665; Wiesenburg
- Died: 25 February 1748 (aged 82); Neustadt an der Orla
- Spouse: Frederick Henry, Duke of Saxe-Zeitz-Pegau-Neustadt
- House: Oldenburg
- Father: Philip Louis, Duke of Schleswig-Holstein-Sonderburg-Wiesenburg
- Mother: Anna Margaret of Hesse-Homburg

Anna Fredericka Philippine of Schleswig-Holstein-Sonderburg-Wiesenburg (4 July 1665 - 25 February 1748), was a German noblewoman member of the House of Oldenburg and by marriage Duchess of Saxe-Zeitz-Pegau-Neustadt.

Born in Wiesenburg, Margraviate of Brandenburg, she was the thirteenth of fifteen children born from the second marriage of Philip Louis, Duke of Schleswig-Holstein-Sonderburg-Wiesenburg with Anna Margaret of Hesse-Homburg. From her fourteen full-siblings, only seven survive adulthood: Frederick, Sophie Elisabeth (by marriage Duchess of Saxe-Zeitz), Charles Louis, Eleanor Margaret (by marriage Princess of Liechtenstein), William Christian, Magdalene Sophie (Abbess in Quedlinburg) and Johanna Magdalene Louise. In addition, she had two further older half-siblings from her father's first marriage with Catharina of Waldeck-Wildungen, of whom only one survive: Dorothea Elisabeth (by her two marriages Countess of Sinzendorf, Rabutin and Marchioness de Fremonville).

== Life ==
On 27 February 1702, Anna Fredericka Philippine married Frederick Henry, Duke of Saxe-Zeitz-Pegau-Neustadt in Moritzburg Castle. They had two children, of whom only one survive adulthood:

1. Maurice Adolph Charles (Moritzburg, 1 December 1702 - Pöltenberg, 20 June 1759), Duke of Saxe-Zeitz-Pegau-Neustadt (1713–18), Bishop of Hradec Králové (Königrgrätz) (1732) and Litoměřice (Leitmeritz) (1733–52),
2. Dorothea Charlotte (Moritzburg, 20 May 1708 - Moritzburg, 8 November 1708).

Anna Fredericka Philippine died in Neustadt an der Orla, aged 82.

Anna Fredericka Philippine of Schleswig-Holstein-Sonderburg-Wiesenburg House of Oldenburg Born: 4 July 1665 Died: 25 February 1748
German royalty
Vacant Title last held by Sophie Angelika of Württemberg-Oels	Duchess consort of Saxe-Zeitz-Pegau-Neustadt; 1702–1713	Merged to the Duchy of Saxe-Zeitz
