= Christian August of Saxe-Zeitz =

German prince

His Eminence Christian August von Sachsen-Zeitz
- Cardinal, Archbishop of Esztergom; Primate of Hungary
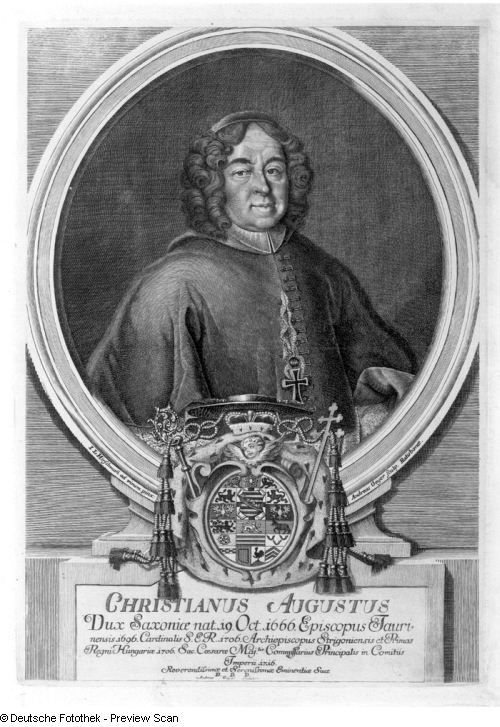
- Church: Catholic
- Archdiocese: Esztergom
- Appointed: 24 January 1701
- In office: 1707-1725
- Predecessor: Leopold Karl von Kollonitsch
- Successor: Imre Esterházy
- Other post: Bishop of Győr

Orders
- Created cardinal: 17 May 1706 by Clement XI
- Rank: Cardinal-Priest

Personal details
- Born: 9 October 1666 Moritzburg, Germany
- Died: 23 August 1725 (aged 58) Regensburg, Germany
- Buried: St. Martin's Cathedral, Bratislava
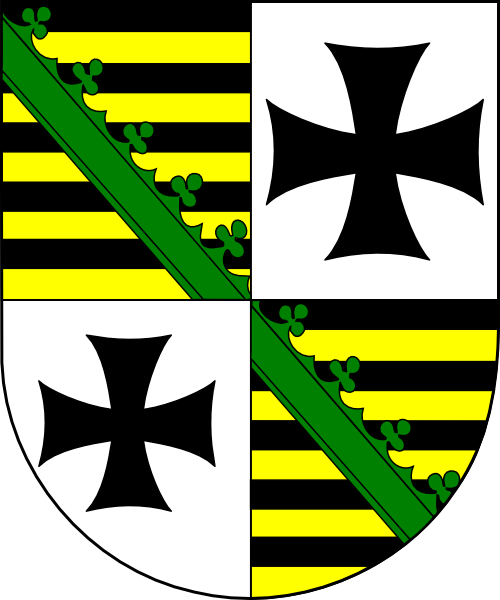
- Coat of arms

Christian August of Saxe-Zeitz (9 October 1666 in Moritzburg – 23 August 1725 in Regensburg), was a German prince of the House of Wettin. He was also a cardinal of the Catholic Church.

Christian August of Saxe-Zeitz was a Teutonic Knight, the Primas of Hungary and finally a cardinal. On 22 May 1712 he crowned Charles VI, Holy Roman Emperor as the King of Hungary and on 18 October 1714 also his wife Elisabeth Christine of Brunswick-Wolfenbüttel in St. Martin's Cathedral.

== Life ==
He was the third (but second surviving) son of Maurice, Duke of Saxe-Zeitz, and his second wife, Dorothea Maria of Saxe-Weimar.

A Teutonic Knight, he converted to Catholicism in 1696 and became Provost of Cologne (1696–1725), then Bishop of Raab (1696–1725) and finally on 17 May 1706 was created a Cardinal by Pope Clement XI.

At that time, it was the law that the king of Poland must be a Catholic. As such, Christian August was chosen to convert his kinsman, the King-Elector August the Strong of Poland to the Catholic faith. Christian August instructed him secretly and on 1 June 1697 baptized him secretly in the Court Chapel (Hofkapelle) in Baden bei Wien, then publicly and solemnly in the German Piekar in Oppeln. When the conversion was finally formalized, Christian August issued a certificate to the king, which was authenticated by the Papal nunzio.

In 1707 Christian August was elected Archbishop of Esztergom (Gran) and consequently, Primas of Hungary. He used the office of a deputy of the Emperor as Principal Commissioner (Prinzipalkommissar) in the Perpetual Imperial Diet (Reichstag) of Regensburg.

On the occasion of the victory over the Turks in Belgrade in 1717 Christian August, as representative of the Emperor Charles VI, organized a magnificent celebration in the Imperial Diet realm. During the festivities, the Order of St. Emmeram was created in the knight's hall on 26 October.

The death of his brother Maurice Wilhelm, Duke of Saxe-Zeitz, on 15 November 1718 without surviving male issue, made him heir to the duchy of Saxe-Zeitz, but because he took the monastic vows (and the next in line to the inheritance, Christian August's nephew Maurice Adolf, was also a priest), Zeitz was merged into the Electorate of Saxony in accordance with the will of Elector Johann Georg I.

== Death ==
Christian August of Saxe-Zeitz died on 23 August 1725 in Regensburg; he is buried in the crypts of St. Martin's Cathedral in Bratislava the capital of present-day Slovakia.

Catholic Church titles
Preceded by Leopold Karl von Kollonitsch	Archbishop of Esztergom; 1707–1725	Succeeded by Imre Esterházy
