= Wiesenburg Castle =

Castle in Wildenfels, Germany

Coordinates: 50°39′06.1″N 12°34′01.0″E

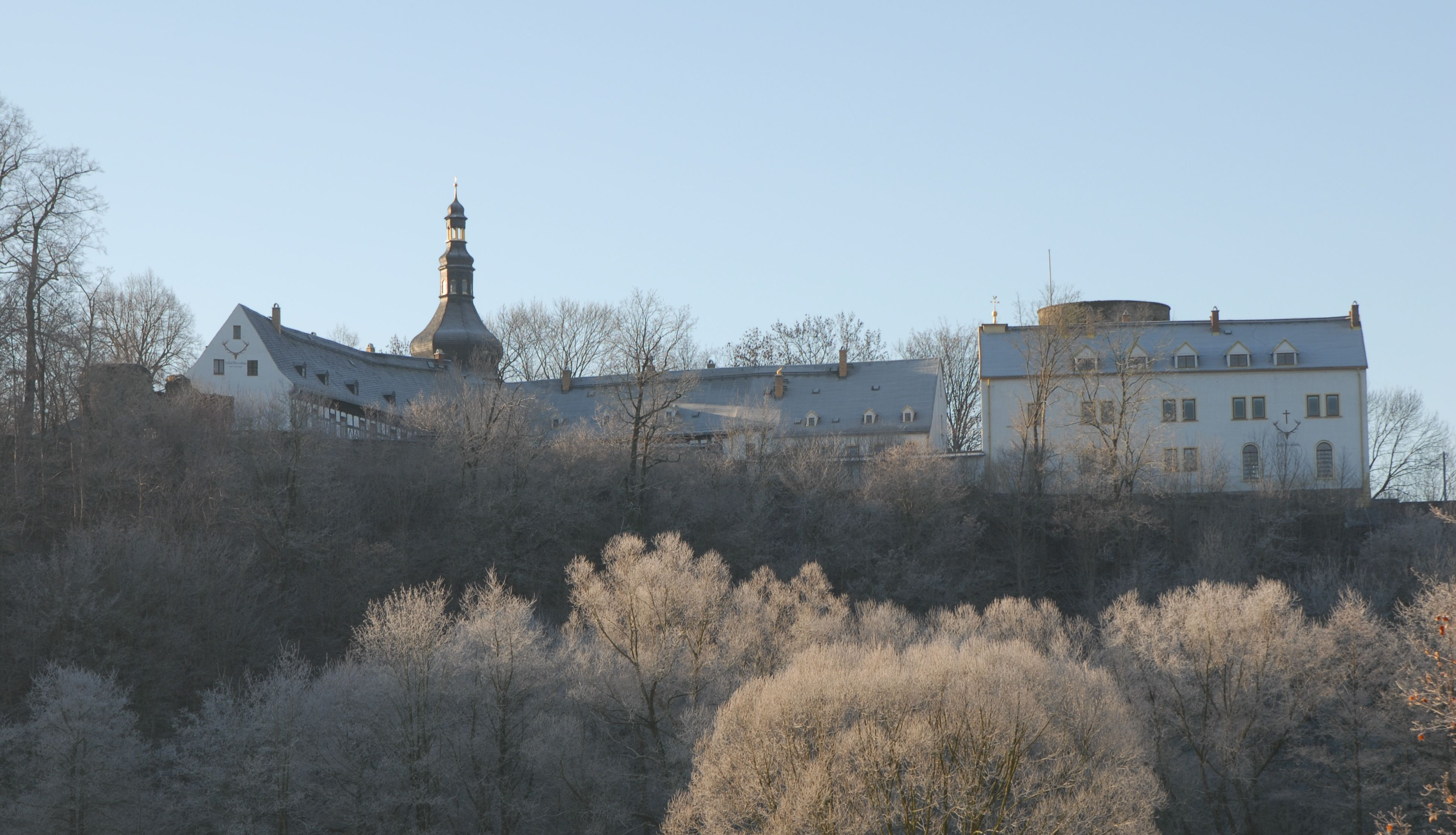
Wiesenburg Castle

The Wiesenburg Castle (German: Burg Wiesenburg or Schloss Wiesenburg) is a castle located in the Wiesenburg district of Wildenfels, Germany, on a hill overlooking the eastern shore of the Mulde river. The castle protects the bridge across the Mulde to Schönau and Wildenfels.

== Structure ==
The modern structure arose out of a medieval castle, the construction of which probably began around the year 1200. The castle was first mentioned in a document dated 1251. The building was expanded in the 14th century.

The only remains of the original castle are a part of the round keep, remnants of the castle wall, and a moat. The modern courtyard, with timber construction and a octagonal gate tower, were developed when the castle was reconstructed in 1664 after the Thirty Years' War.

== History and owners ==
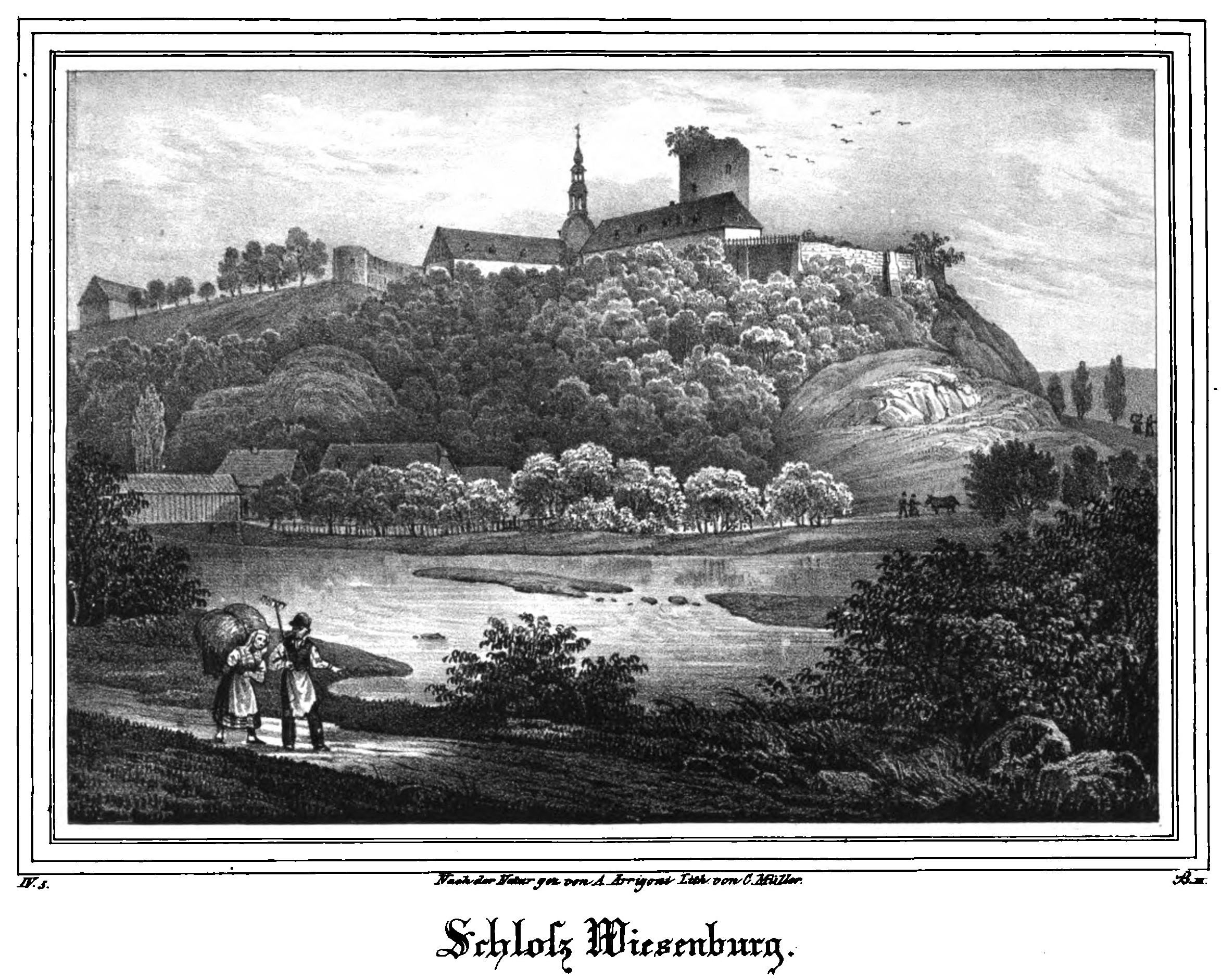
Wiesenburg Castle, lithograph 1839

The first owners were the Vogts of Weida, who monitored the settling of the Kirchberg, Saxony basin and the Mulde area south-east of Zwickau. The inhabitants of more than twenty villages in the area had to pay socage to the castle, for example, all villages in the Rödel valley. Later, the castle ownership changed many times:

- 1350 – the castle came into the possession of the House of Wettin
- 1412 – the castle was owned by the von der Planitz family
- 1523 – the castle was sacked by the serfs. Two years later, the peasants revolted again. Based on the time-imposed fines, one can calculate that 283 farmers must have participated in the uprising. That would have been almost all farmers of the estate subject to socage.
- 1591 – the city of Zwickau purchased the castle and the dominion
- 1618 – the Elector of Saxony obtained the castle
- 1663 – castle was sold to Philip Louis of Holstein-Sonderburg
- 1724 – the lordship was acquired by Augustus II the Strong, who turned it into am Amt
- 1803 – the great hall collapsed
- 1864 – the castle and dominion were separated, the castle was sold to the district poor law association
- 1911 – the castle was bought back
- 1945 – the castle was publicly owned; many homes were created inside the structure. The farm buildings were used by the local Landwirtschaftliche Produktionsgenossenschaft (collectived farms, comparable to a Kolkhoz in the Soviet Union).
- 1990 – the castle is privately owned again. It is not publicly accessible.

== Legend ==
Legends tell of a secret passage which connects the castle with a "robber's castle" in the Kiefericht (a grove on the other side of the Mulde Valley).
