= Moritz Wilhelm, Duke of Saxe-Zeitz =

Duke of Saxe-Zeitz (1664–1718)

Mortiz Wilhelm
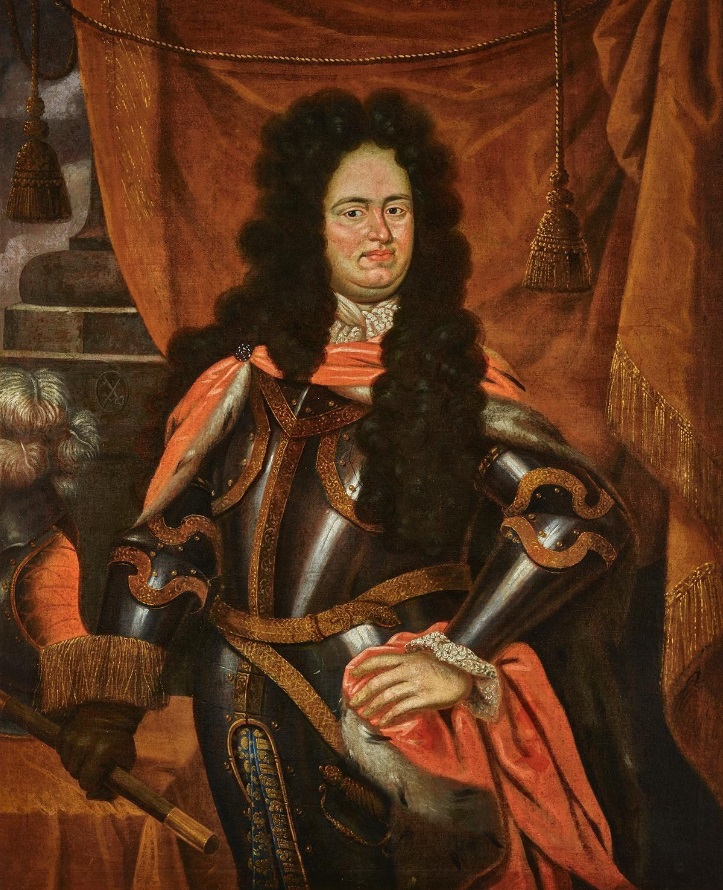

Duke of Saxe-Zeitz
- Reign: 4 December 1681 – 15 November 1718
- Predecessor: Maurice
- Born: 12 March 1664; Schloss Moritzburg, Duchy of Saxe-Zeitz
- Died: 15 November 1718 (aged 54); Osterburg, Weida
- Spouse: Marie Amalie of Brandenburg (m. 1689)
- Issue among others..: Dorothea Wilhelmine, Landgravine of Hesse-Kassel
- House: Wettin
- Father: Maurice, Duke of Saxe-Zeitz
- Mother: Dorothea Maria of Saxe-Weimar

Moritz Wilhelm (English: Maurice William; 12 March 1664 – 15 November 1718), a member of the Saxon House of Wettin, was the second and last Duke of Saxe-Zeitz from 1681 until his death.

== Life ==
He was born at Moritzburg Castle in the Wettin residence of Zeitz, the eldest son of Duke Maurice of Saxe-Zeitz and his second wife, Dorothea Maria, a younger daughter of the Wettin duke Wilhelm of Saxe-Weimar. Duke Maurice had received the secundogeniture of Saxe-Zeitz from the hands of his father, Elector John George I of Saxony in 1652 and had Moritzburg Castle erected as his residence. He had two sons from his first marriage, but both died in infancy long before Moritz Wilhelm's birth.

Moritz Wilhelm received a comprehensive education, mainly in ancient languages and theology; in 1681 he met with Philipp Spener during his Grand Tour in Frankfurt and in his later years kept up a fruitful correspondence with the philosopher Gottfried Wilhelm Leibniz. The sixteen-year-old succeeded as duke of Saxe-Zeitz upon the death of his father on 4 December 1681. However, he had to accept the guardianship of his Wettin cousin Elector John George III until 1684.

The relationship with the Saxon electors remained tense, similar to the other Wettin secundogenitures of Saxe-Weissenfels and Saxe-Merseburg. Suspiciously eyed by his cousins, Moritz Wilhelm sought support at the Imperial court in Vienna as well as by the Electors of Brandenburg, leading to his marriage with Princess Marie Amalie, a daughter of the "Great Elector" Frederick William and devout promoter of the Calvinist faith. It was due to his published defense of this marriage that philosopher Christian Thomasius was forced to leave the strongly Lutheran Leipzig to settle in Halle, where he was involved in the creation of the university there, under the patronage of Frederick William.

Moritz Wilhelm tried to reach the acknowledgement of his Saxe-Zeitz lands as a sovereign Imperial State, referring to the princely Hochstift rights of the former Bishops of Naumburg-Zeitz; however, his attempts failed due to the veto of the Saxon electors. When he even tried to gain Swedish support during the Great Northern War, Saxon troops temporarily occupied his country in 1709.

After Moritz Wilhelm's only son and heir, Frederick August, died in 1710 at the age of nine, the duke finally reconciled with the Saxon electors and waived all claims to Imperial immediacy. Already in 1699, he had given the towns of Pegau and Neustadt as appanages to his youngest brother Frederick Henry. Chosen as being the heir of Saxe-Zeitz, Frederick Henry, nevertheless, died in 1713. As Moritz Wilhelm's brother Christian August had chosen an ecclesiastical career, the secundogeniture would fell back to the main line of Wettin electors.

Shortly before his death in 1717, the duke converted from Calvinism to Catholicism in order to please his brother Christian August, who was a Prince of that Church as Archbishop of Esztergom and Primate of Hungary. Forced out of his Zeitz residence, he shifted the seat of his government to Weida and retired to Osterburg Castle. Urged by his consort and the Halle pietist August Hermann Francke, he revoked his conversion a few weeks before his death.

== Marriage and issue ==
In Potsdam on 25 June 1689, Moritz Wilhelm married Marie Amalie of Brandenburg. They had six children:

1. Frederick William (b. Moritzburg, 26 March 1690 – d. Moritzburg, 15 May 1690) died in infancy.
2. Dorothea Wilhelmine (b. Moritzburg, 20 March 1691 – d. Kassel, 17 March 1743), married on 27 September 1717 to Landgrave William VIII of Hesse-Kassel (or Hesse-Cassel).
3. Karoline Amalie (b. Moritzburg, 24 May 1693 – d. Moritzburg, 5 September 1694) died in infancy.
4. Sophie Charlotte (b. Moritzburg, 25 April 1695 – d. Moritzburg, 18 June 1696) died young.
5. Frederick Augustus (b. Moritzburg, 12 August 1700 – d. Halle, 17 February 1710) died young.

Moritz Wilhelm's monogram

He died at Weida without surviving male issue. Because his two remaining heirs, his brother Christian August and his nephew Maurice Adolf, were ordained priests, Zeitz was merged back to the Electorate of Saxony.

Moritz Wilhelm, Duke of Saxe-Zeitz House of Wettin Born: 12 March 1664 Died: 15 November 1718
Preceded by Maurice	Duke of Saxe-Zeitz; 1681 – 1718	Succeeded by Duchy returned to the Electorate of Saxony
