= Frederick Henry, Duke of Saxe-Zeitz-Pegau-Neustadt =

Friedrich Heinrich
- Duke of Saxe-Zeitz-Pegau-Neustadt
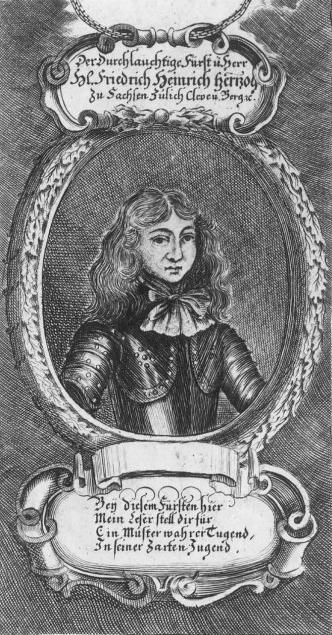
- Born: 21 July 1668; Moritzburg
- Died: 18 December 1713 (aged 45); Neustadt an der Orla
- Spouse: Sophie Angelika of Württemberg-Oels; Anna Fredericka Philippine of Schleswig-Holstein-Sonderburg-Wiesenburg
- Issue: Maurice Adolf Karl; Dorothea Charlotte
Names
- German: Friedrich Heinrich
- House: Wettin
- Father: Maurice, Duke of Saxe-Zeitz
- Mother: Dorothea Maria of Saxe-Weimar

Frederick Heinrich of Saxe-Zeitz-Pegau-Neustadt (21 July 1668 in Moritzburg – 18 December 1713 in Neustadt an der Orla), was a German prince of the House of Wettin.

He was the fourth (but third surviving) son of Maurice, Duke of Saxe-Zeitz, and his second wife, Dorothea Maria of Saxe-Weimar.

== Life ==
In Öls on 23 April 1699, Frederick Henry married Sophie Angelika of Württemberg-Oels. Shortly after, his older brother, Duke Moritz Wilhelm, Duke of Saxe-Zeitz, gave him the towns of Pegau and Neustadt as appanage. From then on, he assumed the title duke of Saxe-Zeitz-Pegau-Neustadt (Herzog von Sachsen-Zeitz-Pegau-Neustadt). His wife Sophie died after only nineteen months of marriage on 11 November 1700.

In Moritzburg on 27 February 1702, Frederick married for a second time to Anna Fredericka Philippine of Schleswig-Holstein-Sonderburg-Wiesenburg. They had two children:

1. Maurice Adolph Charles (b. Moritzburg, 1 December 1702 - d. Pöltenberg, 20 June 1759), Duke of Saxe-Zeitz-Pegau-Neustadt (1713–18), Bishop of Hradec Králové (Königrgrätz) (1732) and Litoměřice (Leitmeritz) (1733–52), he died without issue.
2. Dorothea Charlotte (b. Moritzburg, 20 May 1708 - d. Moritzburg, 8 November 1708) died in infancy.

The death of his nephew, the Hereditary Duke Frederick August, on 17 February 1710, made him the heir apparent of the duchy of Saxe-Zeitz, because his immediate older brother Christian August was a priest.

Nevertheless, he died three years later, five before his brother Maurice Wilhelm. His only son, Maurice Adolf Karl, succeeded him in Pegau-Neustadt, but, still a minor, he was placed under the custody of his uncle Maurice Wilhelm and became the new heir apparent of Saxe-Zeitz. However, soon afterwards (1718) the young Maurice Adolf himself became a priest and renounced his claims to the duchy, which made the extinction of the Saxe-Zeitz line inevitable.

Without other male heirs, Zeitz was finally merged into the Electorate of Saxony after the death of Maurice Wilhelm.

Preceded by new creation	Duke of Saxe-Zeitz-Pegau-Neustadt; 1699 – 1713	Succeeded by duchy merged into the duchy of Saxe-Zeitz under Maurice Wilhelm
