= Maurice, Duke of Saxe-Zeitz =

Maurice
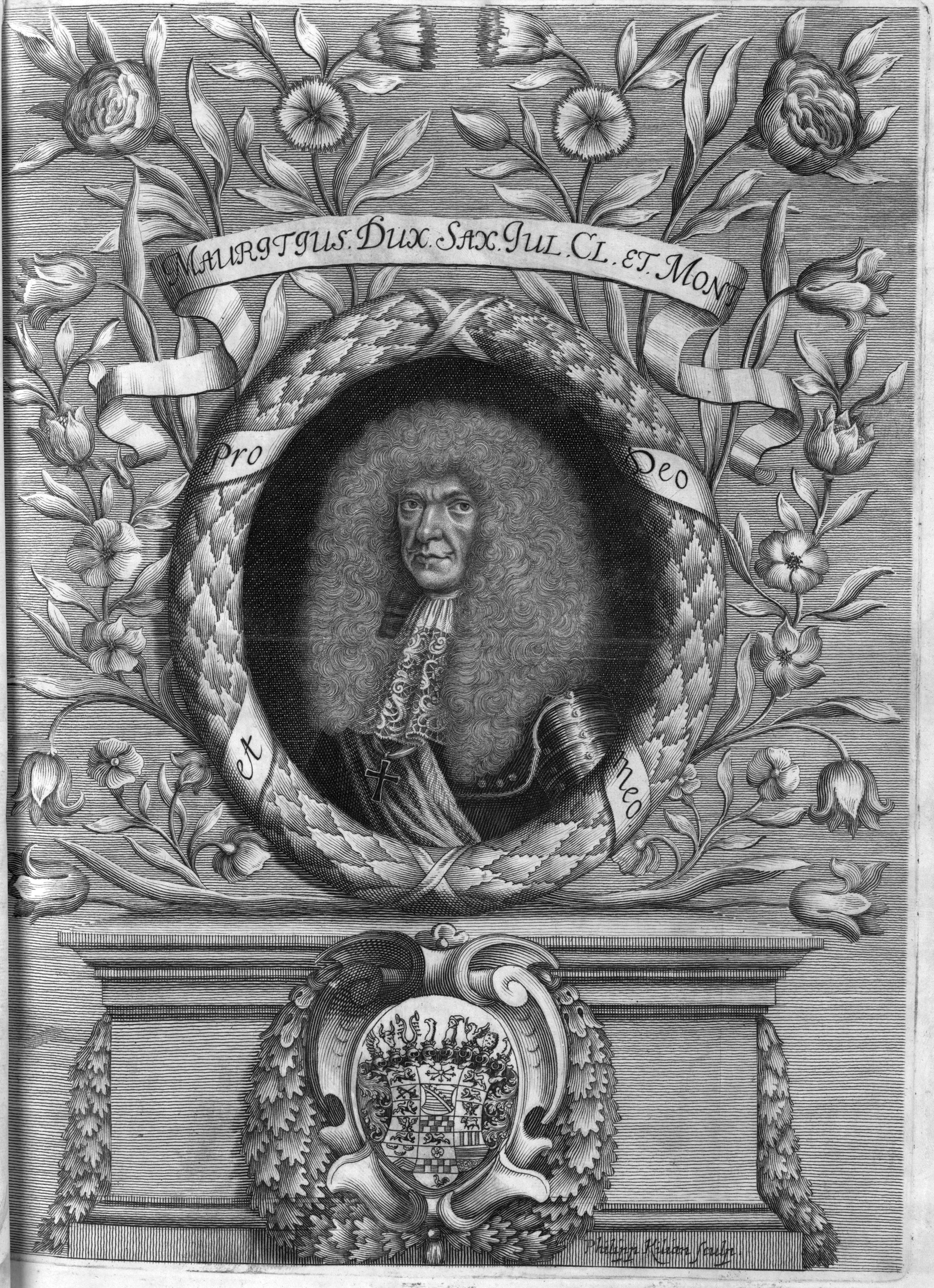
- 1680 engraving

Duke of Saxe-Zietz
- Reign: 22 April 1657 – 4 December 1681
- Successor: Maurice William
- Born: 28 March 1618; Dresden
- Died: 4 December 1681 (aged 63); Zeitz
- Spouse: Sophie Hedwig of Schleswig-Holstein-Sonderburg-Glücksburg (m. 1650; died 1652) Dorothea Maria of Saxe-Weimar (m. 1656; died 1675) Sophie Elisabeth of Schleswig-Holstein-Sonderburg-Wiesenburg (m. 1676)
- Issue among others..: Erdmuthe Dorothea, Duchess of Saxe-Merseburg; Maurice William, Duke of Saxe-Zeitz; Christian August, Archbishop of Esztergom; Frederick Henry, Duke of Saxe-Zeitz-Pegau-Neustadt
- House: Wettin
- Father: John George I, Elector of Saxony
- Mother: Magdalene Sibylle of Prussia

Maurice of Saxe-Zeitz (28 March 1619 – 4 December 1681) was a duke of Saxe-Zeitz and member of the House of Wettin.

Born in Dresden, he was the youngest surviving son of John George I, Elector of Saxony, and his second wife Magdalene Sibylle of Prussia.

== Life ==
Together with his brothers, Maurice was educated at the court of the Elector of Saxony in Dresden. Among his teachers, Field Marshal Kurt of Einsiedel took an outstanding role. From August 1642 until September 1645, Maurice and his brother Christian took a Grand Tour through northern Germany and the Netherlands.

In 1645, shortly after his return home, Maurice was selected by Prince Ludwig I of Anhalt-Köthen to be a member of the Fruitbearing Society.

In 1650, he was appointed Bailiwick of Thuringia by the Teutonic Knights. He selected as his chancellor and president to his consistory the noted state scientist and theologian Veit Ludwig von Seckendorff. As Hofprediger he chose the dramatist Johann Sebastian Mitternacht.

The Elector Johann Georg I, in his will 20 July 1652, ordered a division of the Albertine territories that was carried out on 22 April 1657 in Dresden. Maurice inherited the town of Zeitz and became its first duke.

In order to have an appropriate official residence, Maurice decided to remove the old bishop's castle and build a splendid new residence in baroque style that was called Schloss Moritzburg. The construction began in 1657 and was finished in 1678. The duke died on 4th December 1681 in Dresden.

== Marriages and issue ==
In Dresden on 19 November 1650, Maurice married Sophie Hedwig of Schleswig-Holstein-Sonderburg-Glücksburg, a daughter of Philip, Duke of Schleswig-Holstein-Sonderburg-Glücksburg and at the same time his brother Christian also married her sister Christiana of Schleswig-Holstein-Sonderburg-Glücksburg. The opera Paris und Helena was composed for the occasion by Heinrich Schütz. Maurice and Sophie had two sons:

1. Johann Philipp (b. Dresden, 12 November 1651 – d. Dresden, 24 March 1652) died young.
2. Maurice (b. Dresden, 26 September 1652 – d. Dresden, 10 May 1653) died young.

In Weimar on 3 July 1656, Maurice married for a second time to Dorothea Maria of Saxe-Weimar, daughter of the Duke Wilhelm. They had ten children:

1. Eleonore Magdalene (b. Weimar, 30 October 1658 – d. Dresden, 26 February 1661) died young.
2. Wilhelmine Eleonore (b. and d. Dresden, September 1 1659) died in infancy.
3. Erdmuthe Dorothea (b. Naumburg, 13 November 1661 – d. Merseburg, 29 April 1720), married on 14 October 1679 to Duke Christian II of Saxe-Merseburg.
4. Maurice Wilhelm, Duke of Saxe-Zeitz (b. Moritzburg, 12 March 1664 – d. Weida, 15 November 1718).
5. Johann Georg (b. Moritzburg, 27 April 1665 – d. Moritzburg, 5 September 1666) died young.
6. Christian August (b. Moritzburg, 9 October 1666 – d. Regensburg, 23 August 1725), Cardinal, Archbishop of Gran and Primate of Hungary.
7. Frederick Heinrich (b. Moritzburg, 21 July 1668 – d. Neustadt an der Orla, 18 December 1713), inherited Pegau and Neustadt.
8. Marie Sophie (b. Moritzburg, 3 November 1670 – d. Moritzburg, 31 May 1671) died in infancy.
9. Magdalene Sibylle (b. Moritzburg, 7 April 1672 – d. Moritzburg, 20 August 1672) died in infancy.
10. Wilhelmine Sophie (b and d. Moritzburg, 11 June 1675) died in infancy.

In Wiesenburg on 14 June 1676 Maurice married for a third time to Sophie Elisabeth of Schleswig-Holstein-Sonderburg-Wiesenburg, daughter of Philip Louis, Duke of Schleswig-Holstein-Sonderburg-Wiesenburg. This union was childless.

Maurice, Duke of Saxe-Zeitz House of Wettin Born: 28 March 1619 Died: 4 December 1681
Preceded by new creation	Duke of Saxe-Zeitz; 1657 – 1681	Succeeded by Maurice Wilhelm
