= Saxe-Zeitz =

Territory of the Holy Roman Empire (1657–1718)

Duchy of Saxe-Zeitz Herzogtum Sachsen-Zeitz (German)
- 1657–1718
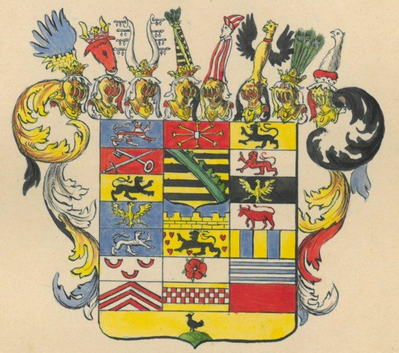
- Coat of arms

- Saxe-Zeitz territories within the Wettin lands, c. 1680
- Status: Secundogeniture of Saxony
- Capital: Zeitz
- Government: Duchy
- Historical era: Early modern Europe
  - Established: 1657
  - Fell back to Saxony: 1718
Preceded by	Succeeded by
Electorate of Saxony	Electorate of Saxony

The Duchy of Saxe-Zeitz (German: Herzogtum Sachsen-Zeitz) was a territory of the Holy Roman Empire established in 1657 as a secundogeniture of the Electoral Saxon house of House of Wettin. Its capital was Zeitz. The territory fell back to the Wettin electoral line in 1718.

== History ==
On 20 July 1652, the Saxon elector John George I stipulated in his will that, while the electoral dignity passes to his eldest son John George II, his three younger brothers should receive secundogeniture principalities upon his death. After the elector died on 8 October 1656, his sons concluded the "friend-brotherly main treaty" in the Saxon residence of Dresden on 22 April 1657 and a further treaty in 1663 delineating their territories and sovereign rights definitely. These treaties created three duchies:

- Saxe-Zeitz,
- Saxe-Weissenfels and
- Saxe-Merseburg.

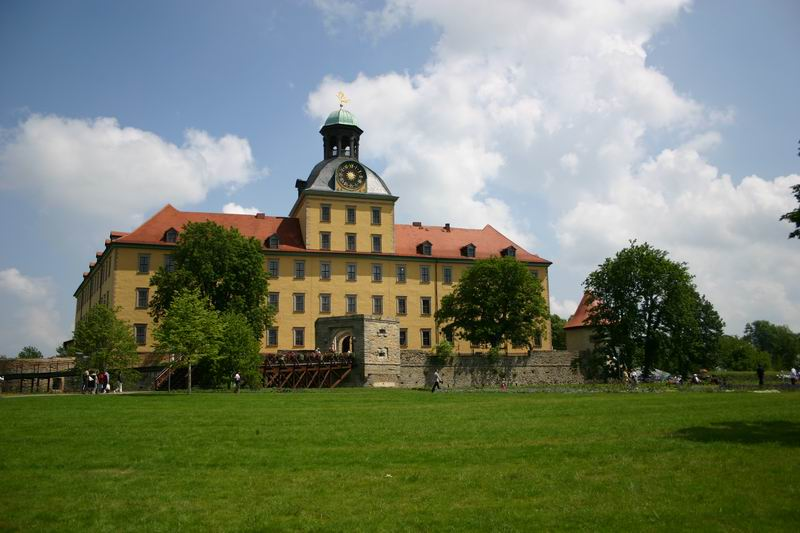
Moritzburg Palace, Zeitz, Burgenlandkreis, Saxony-Anhalt

Prince Maurice, the fourth-oldest son received the districts of Zeitz, Naumburg and Haynsburg in the former Bishopric of Naumburg-Zeitz which in 1562 had been secularized in the course of the Protestant Reformation.

He also received the city of Schleusingen in 1660, which had once been the residence of the extinct Counts of Henneberg, together with the districts of Suhl and Kühndorf. Duke Maurice resided in the city castle at Naumburg until his new seat at Moritzburg Palace in Zeitz had been completed.

== Rulers ==
The only rulers were Duke Maurice of Saxe-Zeitz and his son Duke Moritz Wilhelm of Saxe-Zeitz. This line was the first of the three Saxon secundogenitures to die out in 1718, when the only male heir, Prince Christian August, joined the clergy. Zeitz was merged into the Electorate of Saxony in accordance with the will of Elector Johann Georg I.

== Relatives ==
- Erdmuthe Dorothea of Saxe-Zeitz (1661–1720), consort of Duke Christian II of Saxe-Merseburg
- Christian August of Saxe-Zeitz (1666–1725), Primate of Hungary and Cardinal
- Frederick Henry, Duke of Saxe-Zeitz-Pegau-Neustadt (1668–1713)
- Dorothea Wilhelmine of Saxe-Zeitz (1691–1743), by marriage to William VIII, Landgrave of Hesse-Kassel
