= List of Saxon royal consorts =

Royal consorts in Saxony

This is a list of the Duchesses, Electresses and Queens of Saxony; the consorts of the Duke of Saxony and its successor states; including the Electorate of Saxony, the Kingdom of Saxony, the House of Ascania, Albertine, and the Ernestine Saxony.

== Ducal Saxony ==
=== Duchess of Saxony ===
- ? – 800: Geva of Westfold, wife of Widukind, daughter of the Danish king Goimo I and sister of the Danish kings Ragnar and Siegfried, d. a. 800

Liudolfing Dynasty
Picture	Name	Father	Birth	Marriage	Became Duchess	Ceased to be Duchess	Death	Husband
	Oda	Billung, princep	805	before 830	845	866 husband's death	17 May 913	Liudolf
	Hedwiga	Henry of Franconia (Babenberg)	850/55	869/70	2 February 880 husband's accession	24 December 903		Otto I
	Matilda	Dietrich, Count of Westphalia (Immedinger)	895	909	30 November 912 husband's accession	2 July 936 husband's death	14 March 968	Henry I
	Eadgyth	Edward the Elder (Wessex)	910	September 929	2 July 936 husband's accession	26 January 946		Otto II
	Adelaide of Italy and Burgundy	Rudolph II of Burgundy (Elder Welf)	931	October/November 951		961 the Liudolfings replaced by the Billungs	16 December 999	Otto II
Billung Dynasty
	Oda	-	-	-	-	-	15 March in an unknown year	Hermann
	Hildesuith of Westerbourg	-	-	-	-	-	-	Hermann
	Hildegarde of Stade	Henry I, Count of Stade	974/7	990		9 February 1011 husband's death	3 October 1011	Bernard I
	Eilika of Schweinfurt	Henry of Schweinfurt	1000	1020		10 December 1055/1056		Bernard II
	Wulfhild of Norway	Olaf II of Norway (Fairhair)	-	November 1042	29 June 1059 husband's accession	24 May 1071		Ordulf
	Gertrude of Haldensleben	Conrad, Count of Haldensleben	-	1071, after May		28 March 1072 husband's death	21 February 1116	Ordulf
	Sophia of Hungary	Béla I of Hungary (Árpád)	1045/50	after 6 March 1070	28 March 1072 husband's accession	18 June 1095		Magnus
Süpplingenburg Dynasty
	Richenza of Northeim	Henry, Margrave of Frisia (Northeim)	1087/89	1100	23 August 1106 husband's accession	4 December 1137 husband's death	10 June 1141	Lothair
Welf Dynasty (1)
	Gertrude of Süpplingenburg	Lothair (Süpplingenburg)	18 April 1115	29 May 1127	4 December 1137 husband's accession	20 October 1139 husband's death	18 April 1143	Henry II
Ascanian Dynasty (1)
	Sophie of Winzenburg	Herman I, Count of Winzenburg	-	1124, after 7 December	20 October 1139 husband's accession	1142 husband renounces claims	25 March 1160	Albert I
Welf Dynasty (2)
	Clementia of Zähringen	Conrad I, Duke of Zähringen (Zähringen)	-	1147		23 November 1162 divorce	1167	Henry III
	Matilda of England	Henry II of England (Plantagenet)	June 1156	1 February 1168		1180 husband lost duchy	13 July 1189	Henry III
Ascanian Dynasty (2)
	Judith of Poland	Mieszko III the Old (Piast)	before 1154	1173	1180 husband gained duchy	after 12 December 1201		Bernard III
	Agnes of Austria	Leopold VI, Duke of Austria (Babenberg)	19 February 1205	1222		29 August 1226		Albert I
	Agnes of Thuringia	Hermann I, Landgrave of Thuringia (Ludowinger)	1205	1238		1246		Albert I
	Helene of Brunswick-Lüneburg	Otto I, Duke of Brunswick-Lüneburg (Welf)	18 March 1223	1247		7 October 1260 husband's death	6 September 1273	Albert I
Saxony split into the duchies of Saxe-Wittenberg and Saxe-Lauenburg who both claimed and used the titles of Dukes of Saxony, Westphalia and Angria.

== Ascanian Ducal Saxony ==
=== Duchess of Saxe-Lauenburg ===
Ascanian Dynasty (3) – Saxe-Lauenburg line
Picture	Name	Father	Birth	Marriage	Became Duchess	Ceased to be Duchess	Death	Husband
	Ingeborg Birgersdotter	Birger Jarl (Bjälbo)	1253	1270		1282 husband resigned	30 June 1302	John I
	Agnes of Habsburg	Rudolph I of Germany (Habsburg)	1257	October 1273		1282 husband turned from co-ruling duke into regent for his minor nephews	11 October 1322	Albert II
In 1305 Saxe-Lauenburg split into the duchies of Saxe-Bergedorf-Mölln (1305–1401) and Saxe-Ratzeburg-Lauenburg (1305–1689) who both used the titles of Dukes of Saxony, Westphalia and Angria.
Ascanian Dynasty (4) – Saxe-Bergedorf-Mölln line
	Elisabeth of Holstein-Rendsburg	Henry I, Count of Holstein-Rendsburg (Schaumburg)	1300	1315		22 April 1322 husband's death	before 1340	John II
	Beata of Schwerin	Gunzelin VI, Count of Schwerin	-	by 30 May 1334		before 1341		Albert IV
	Sophie of Werle-Güstrow	John II, Lord of Werle-Güstrow (Mecklenburg-Werle)	1329	1341		February 1343 husband's death	5 September 1364	Albert IV
	Katharina of Werle-Güstrow	Nicholas III, Lord of Werle-Güstrow (Mecklenburg-Werle)	-	by 25 January 1366		1370 husband's death	after 17 December 1402	Albert V
In 1401 Saxe-Lauenburg reunited when the Saxe-Bergedorf-Mölln line (1305–1401) was extinct with Eric IV of Saxe-Ratzeburg-Lauenburg inheriting Saxe-Bergedorf-Mölln.
Ascanian Dynasty (5) – Saxe-Lauenburg line (1305–1401 as Saxe-Ratzeburg-Lauenburg distinguished from Saxe-Bergedorf-Mölln)
	Margaret of Brandenburg-Salzwedel	Albert III, Margrave of Brandenburg-Salzwedel (Ascania)	1270	24 September 1302; Papal dispensation		October 1308 husband's death	1 May 1315	Albert III
	Elisabeth of Pomerania	Bogislaw IV, Duke of Pomerania (Pomerania)	1291	1318		1338 husband resigned	after 16 October 1349	Eric I
	Agnes of Holstein-Plön	John III, Count of Holstein-Plön (Schaumburg)	-	1342/1349		1368 husband's death	1386/7	Eric II
	Sophie of Brunswick-Wolfenbüttel	Magnus II, Duke of Brunswick-Wolfenbüttel (Welf)	1358	8 April 1373		21 June 1411 husband's death	by 28 May 1416	Eric IV
In 1401 Saxe-Lauenburg reunited as the Saxe-Bergedorf-Mölln line (1305–1401) extinct with Saxe-Ratzeburg-Lauenburg inheriting its duchy.
	Elisabeth of Holstein-Rendsburg	Nikolaus, Count of Holstein-Rendsburg (Schaumburg)	1384	1404	21 June 1411 husband's accession	28 May 1416		Eric V
	Elisabeth of Weinsberg	Conrad IX of Weinsberg	1397	before 1422		at latest end of 1436 husband's death	after 26 January 1498	Eric V
	Adelheid of Pomerania	Bogislaw VIII, Duke of Pomerania (Pomerania)	1410	2 February 1429	end of 1436 husband's accession	after 1444/45		Bernard II
	Dorothea of Brandenburg	Frederick II, Elector of Brandenburg (Hohenzollern)	1446/1448	12 February 1464		15 August 1507 husband's death	March 1519	John V
	Catherine of Brunswick-Wolfenbüttel	Henry IV, Duke of Brunswick-Wolfenbüttel (Welf)	1488	17/20 November 1509		1 August 1543 husband's death	29 June 1563	Magnus I
	Sibylle of Saxony	Henry IV, Duke of Saxony (Wettin)	2 May 1515	8 February 1540	1 August 1543 husband's accession 1574 husband's reaccession	1571 husband's retirement 19 March 1581 husband's death	18 July 1592	Francis I
	Sophia of Sweden	Gustav I of Sweden (Vasa)	29 October 1547	4 July 1568, however, since 1578 permanently separated	1571 husband's accession on his father's retirement 19 March 1581 husband's accession on his father's death	1574 husband deposed by reaccession of his father 1588 husband deposed by his brothers	17 March 1611	Magnus II
	Margaret of Pomerania-Wolgast	Philip I, Duke of Pomerania-Wolgast (Pomerania)	9 March 1553	26 December 1574	19 March 1581 husband's accession	7 August 1581		Francis II
	Maria of Brunswick-Lüneburg	Julius, Duke of Brunswick-Wolfenbüttel (Welf)	13 January 1566	10 November 1582		2 July 1619 husband's death	13 August 1626	Francis II
	Katharina von Spörck	? von Spörck	?	25 November 1581		1582 divorce	?	Maurice
	Elisabeth Sophie of Holstein-Gottorp	John Adolf, Duke of Holstein-Gottorp (Holstein-Gottorp)	12 December 1599	5 March 1621		25 November 1627		Augustus
	Catharina of Oldenburg	John VII, Count of Oldenburg (Oldenburg)	20 September 1582	4 June 1633		29 February 1644		Augustus
	Anna Magdalene Popel of Lobkowitz	William the Younger Popel of Lobkowicz (Lobkowicz)	20 July 1606	18 August 1632	18 January 1656 husband's accession	20 November 1665 husband's death	7 September 1668	Julius Henry
	Sibylle Hedwig of Saxe-Lauenburg	Augustus, Duke of Saxe-Lauenburg (Ascania)	30 July 1625	1654	20 November 1665 husband's accession	30 July 1666 husband's death	1 August 1703	Francis Erdmann
	Hedwig of the Palatinate-Sulzbach	Christian Augustus, Count Palatine of Sulzbach (Wittelsbach)	15 April 1650	9 April 1668		23 November 1681		Julius Francis
In 1689 the Saxe-Lauenburgian Ascanians were extinct in the male line. The House of Welf usurped the duchy, inhibiting the heiress Anna Maria Franziska of Saxe-Lauenburg, and resucceeded with its Brunswick and Lunenburg-Celle line.
Welf Dynasty (3) – Brunswick and Lunenburg-Celle line
	Eleonore d'Esmier d'Olbreuse	Alexandre II d'Esmier d'Olbreuse (d'Olbreuse)	3 January 1639	1676		28 August 1705 husband's death	5 February 1722	George William
With the Celle line extinct (1705) the Brunswick and Lunenburg-Calenberg line succeeded, forming the Guelphic cadet branch House of Hanover.
Welf Dynasty (4) – cadet branch House of Hanover
	Caroline of Brandenburg-Ansbach	Johann Friedrich, Margrave of Brandenburg-Ansbach (Hohenzollern)	1 March 1683	22 August 1705	11 June 1727 husband's accession	20 November 1737		George II Augustus
	Charlotte of Mecklenburg-Strelitz	Duke Charles Louis Frederick of Mecklenburg (Mecklenburg-Strelitz)	19 May 1744	8 September 1761		about 6 April 1814 dynastic redeployment following Congress of Vienna	17 November 1818	George III
Saxe-Lauenburg gained de jure sovereignty at the dissolution of the Holy Roman Empire on 6 August 1806, but was de facto submitted to occupations, liberation, reoccupation, and annexation during the Napoleonic Wars in 1803, 1805, 1806 and 1807. However, the House of Hanover maintained its claim until the Congress of Vienna in 1814, with the House of Oldenburg then succeeding.
House of Oldenburg
	Marie Sophie of Hesse-Kassel	Landgrave Charles of Hesse-Kassel (Hesse-Kassel)	28 October 1767	31 July 1790	after 6 April 1814 husband gained duchy	3 December 1839 husband's death	21/22 March 1852	Frederick I
	Caroline Amalie of Schleswig-Holstein-Sonderburg-Augustenburg	Frederick Christian II, Duke of Schleswig-Holstein-Sonderburg-Augustenburg (Schleswig-Holstein-Sonderburg-Augustenburg)	28 July 1796	22 May 1815	3 December 1839 husband's accession	20 January 1848 husband's death	9 March 1881	Christian I
	Louise of Hesse-Kassel	Landgrave William of Hesse-Kassel (Hesse-Kassel)	7 September 1817	26 May 1842	5 November 1863 husband's accession	30 October 1864; Conquest by Prussia	29 September 1898	Christian II
In 1864, after the Second Schleswig War, the House of Oldenburg lost the Duchy. The House of Hohenzollern gained the duchy.
House of Hohenzollern
	Augusta of Saxe-Weimar-Eisenach	Charles Frederick, Grand Duke of Saxe-Weimar-Eisenach (Wettin)	30 September 1811	11 June 1829	30 October 1864 husband gained duchy	1876' title turned void, when Saxe-Lauenburg merged in real union into Prussia	7 January 1890	William
In 1876 the Saxe-Lauenburgian Estates of the Realm and Duke William decided to give up Saxe-Lauenburg's statehood. The duchy was thus merged as district Duchy of Lauenburg into the Prussian province of Schleswig-Holstein. In 1890, German Chancellor Otto von Bismarck was awarded the honorific title of Duke of Lauenberg, but he was never sovereign ruler of the territory.
Bismarck family
	Johanna von Puttkamer	Eugen von Puttkamer, Oberpräsident of Posen (Puttkamer)	11 April 1824	28 July 1847	1890 husband received courtesy title	27 November 1894		Otto von Bismarck

=== Duchess of Saxe-Wittenberg ===
Ascanian Dynasty (3) – Saxe-Wittenberg line
Picture	Name	Father	Birth	Marriage	Became Duchess	Ceased to be Duchess	Death	Husband
	Agnes of Habsburg	Rudolph I of Germany (Habsburg)	1257	October 1273		25 August 1298 husband's death	11 October 1322	Albert II
	Judith of Brandenburg	Otto V, Margrave of Brandenburg-Salzwedel (Ascania)	1275/86	1298	25 August 1298 husband's accession	9 May 1328		Rudolph I
	Kunigunde of Poland	Władysław I the Elbow-high (Piast)	before 1298	28 August 1328		9 April 1333		Rudolph I
	Agnes of Lindow-Ruppin	Ulrich I, Count of Lindow-Ruppin	18 December 1314	1333		9 May 1343		Rudolph I
After 1355, the duchesses of Saxe-Wittenberg were also the Electresses of Saxony.
	Elisabeth of Hesse	Otto I, Landgrave of Hesse (Hesse)	-	before 8 May 1336	11 March 1356 husband's accession	6 December 1370 husband's death	30 May 1373	Rudolph II
	Cecilia of Carrara	Francesco I da Carrara, Count of Padua (Carrara)	-	before 11 May 1371 or 23 January 1376		15 May 1388 husband's death	1427/1435	Wenceslas I
	Anna of Thuringia	Balthasar, Landgrave of Thuringia (Wettin)	1377	before 30 November 1389	15 May 1388 husband's accession	4 July 1395		Rudolph III
	Barbara of Legnica	Rupert I of Legnica (Piast)	1372/84	6 March 1396		11 June 1419 husband's death	17 May 1435/6	Rudolph III
	Euphemia of Oels	Konrad III the Old (Piast)	1390	14 January 1402 or 14 January 1420?	11 June 1419 husband's accession	12 November 1422 husband's death	1444	Albert III

== Saxe-Meißen, incorporating Saxe-Wittenberg in 1547 ==
Wettin Dynasty, Albertine Line
Picture	Name	Father	Birth	Marriage	Became Duchess	Ceased to be Duchess	Death	Husband
	Sidonie Podiebrad of Bohemia	George of Kunštát and Poděbrady, King of Bohemia (Poděbrady)	14 November 1449	11 November 1464		12 September 1500 husband's death	1 February 1510	Albert III
	Barbara Jagiellon	Casimir IV Jagiellon, King of Poland (Jagiellon)	15 July 1478	21 November 1496	12 September 1500 husband's accession	15 February 1534		George
	Katharina of Mecklenburg-Schwerin	Magnus II, Duke of Mecklenburg-Schwerin and Güstrow (Mecklenburg-Schwerin)	1487	6 July 1512	17 April 1539 husband's accession	18 August 1541 husband's death	6 June 1561	Henry IV
	Agnes of Hesse	Philip I, Landgrave of Hesse (Hesse)	31 May 1527	9 January 1541	18 August 1541 husband's accession	24 April 1547 became electress	4 November 1555	Maurice

== Saxe-Thuringia, including Saxe-Wittenberg until 1547 ==
Wettin Dynasty, Ernestine Line
Picture	Name	Father	Birth	Marriage	Became Duchess	Ceased to be Duchess	Death	Husband
	Sibylle of Cleves	John III, Duke of Cleves (De la Marck)	17 January 1512	9 February 1527	24 April 1547 husband lost electorate	21 February 1554		John Frederick I
	Agnes of Hesse	Philip I, Landgrave of Hesse (Hesse)	31 May 1527	26 May 1555		4 November 1555		John Frederick II
	Elisabeth of the Palatinate-Simmern	Frederick III, Elector Palatine (Palatinate-Simmern)	30 June 1540	12 June 1558		November 1566 husband's imprisoned	8 February 1594	John Frederick II

== Electorate of Saxony ==
=== Electress of Saxony ===
See: Electresses of Saxony.

House of Ascania
Picture	Name	Father	Birth	Marriage	Became Electress	Ceased to be Electress	Death	Husband
	Elisabeth of Hesse	Otto I, Landgrave of Hesse (Hesse)	-	before 8 May 1336 or 1346	11 March 1356 husband's accession	6 December 1370 husband's death	30 May 1373	Rudolph II
	Cecilia of Carrara	Francesco I da Carrara, Count of Padua (Carrara)	-	23 January 1376		15 May 1388 husband's death	1435	Wenceslaus I
	Anna of Thuringia	Balthasar, Landgrave of Thuringia (Wettin)	1377	before 30 November 1389	15 May 1388 husband's accession	4 July 1395		Rudolph III
	Barbara of Legnica	Rupert I of Legnica (Piast)	1384	6 March 1396		11 June 1419 husband's death	17 May 1435/6	Rudolph III
	Euphemia of Oels	Konrad III the Old (Piast)	1390	14 January 1420		12 November 1422 husband's death	1444	Albert III
House of Wettin
	Catherine of Brunswick-Lüneburg	Henry the Mild, Duke of Brunswick-Lüneburg (Welf)	1395	8 February 1402	6 January 1423 husband's accession	4 January 1428 husband's death	28 December 1442	Frederick I
	Margaret of Austria	Ernest, Duke of Austria (Habsburg)	1416/17	3 June 1431		7 September 1464 husband's death	12 February 1486	Frederick II
	Elisabeth of Bavaria	Albert III, Duke of Bavaria (Wittelsbach)	2 February 1443	19 November 1460	7 September 1464 husband's accession	5 March 1486		Ernest
	Sibylle of Cleves	John III, Duke of Cleves (De la Marck)	17 January 1512	9 February 1527	16 August 1532 husband's accession	24 April 1547 husband's desposition	21 February 1554	John Frederick I
In 1464 the House of Wettin split into Albertine and Ernestine line, holding the title of elector until 1547, thereafter passed on to the former.
House of Wettin – Albertine line
	Agnes of Hesse	Philip I, Landgrave of Hesse (Hesse)	31 May 1527	9 January 1541	24 April 1547 husband's accession	9 July 1553 husband's death	4 November 1555	Maurice
	Anne of Denmark	Christian III of Denmark (Oldenburg)	22 November 1532	7 October 1548	9 July 1553 husband's accession	1 October 1585		Augustus
	Agnes Hedwig of Anhalt	Joachim Ernest, Prince of Anhalt (Ascania)	12 March 1573	3 January 1586		11 February 1586 husband's death	3 November 1616	Augustus
	Sophie of Brandenburg	John George, Elector of Brandenburg (Hohenzollern)	6 June 1568	25 April 1582	11 February 1586 husband's accession	25 September 1591 husband's death	7 December 1622	Christian I
	Hedwig of Denmark	Frederick II of Denmark (Oldenburg)	5 August 1581	12 September 1602		23 June 1611 husband's death	26 November 1641	Christian II
	Magdalene Sibylle of Prussia	Albert Frederick, Duke of Prussia (Hohenzollern)	31 December 1586	19 July 1607	23 June 1611 husband's accession	8 October 1656 husband's death	12 February 1659	John George I
	Magdalene Sibylle of Brandenburg-Bayreuth	Christian, Margrave of Brandenburg-Bayreuth (Hohenzollern)	1 November 1612	13 November 1638	8 October 1656 husband's accession	22 August 1680 husband's death	20 March 1687	John George II
	Anna Sophie of Denmark	Frederick III of Denmark (Oldenburg)	1 September 1647	9 October 1666	22 August 1680 husband's accession	12 September 1691 husband's death	1 July 1717	John George III
	Eleonore Erdmuthe of Saxe-Eisenach	John George I, Duke of Saxe-Eisenach (Wettin)	13 April 1662	17 April 1692		27 April 1694 husband's death	9 September 1696	John George IV
	Christiane Eberhardine of Brandenburg-Bayreuth	Christian Ernst, Margrave of Brandenburg-Bayreuth (Hohenzollern)	19 December 1671	20 January 1693	27 April 1694 husband's accession	4 September 1727		Frederick Augustus I
	Maria Josepha of Austria	Joseph I, Holy Roman Emperor (Habsburg)	8 December 1699	20 August 1719	1 February 1733 husband's accession	17 November 1757		Frederick Augustus II
	Maria Antonia of Bavaria	Charles VII, Holy Roman Emperor (Wittelsbach)	18 July 1724	20 June 1747	5 October 1763 husband's accession	17 December 1763 husband's death	23 April 1780	Frederick Christian
	Amalie of Zweibrücken-Birkenfeld	Frederick Michael, Count Palatine of Zweibrücken (Palatinate-Birkenfeld)	10 May 1752	29 January 1769		20 December 1806 elevated to Queen consort	15 November 1828	Frederick Augustus III

== Albertine Ducal Saxony ==
=== Duchess of Saxe-Weissenfels ===
Duchesses of Saxe-Weissenfels
Picture	Name	Father	Birth	Marriage	Became Duchess	Ceased to be Duchess	Death	Husband
	Anna Maria of Mecklenburg-Schwerin	Adolf Frederick I, Duke of Mecklenburg (Mecklenburg-Schwerin)	1 July 1627	23 November 1647	22 April 1657 husband's accession	11 December 1669		August
	Johanna Walpurgis of Leiningen-Westerburg	George William, Count of Leiningen-Westerburg (Leiningen-Westerburg)	3 June 1647	29 January 1672		4 August 1680 husband's death	4 November 1687	August
	Johanna Magdalena of Saxe-Altenburg	Frederick William II, Duke of Saxe-Altenburg (Wettin)	14 January 1656	25 October 1671	4 August 1680 husband's accession	22 January 1686		John Adolph I
	Fredericka Elisabeth of Saxe-Eisenach	John George I, Duke of Saxe-Eisenach (Wettin)	5 May 1669	7 January 1698		16 March 1712 husband's death	12 November 1730	John George
	Louise Christine of Stolberg-Stolberg-Ortenberg	Christoph Louis I, Count of Stolberg-Stolberg-Ortenberg (Stolberg)	21 January 1675	12 May 1712		28 June 1736 husband's death	16 May 1738	Christian
	Fredericka of Saxe-Gotha-Altenburg	Frederick II, Duke of Saxe-Gotha-Altenburg (Wettin)	17 July 1715	27 November 1734	28 June 1736 husband's accession	16 May 1746 husband's death	2 May 1775	John Adolph II
In 1746, the line of Saxe-Weissenfels became extinct and their land were reincorporated into the Electorate.
Duchess of Saxe-Weissenfels-Barby, Countess of Barby
	Elisabeth Albertine of Anhalt-Dessau	John George II, Prince of Anhalt-Dessau (Ascania)	1 May 1665	30 March 1686		5 October 1706		Henry
	Auguste Louise of Württemberg-Oels	Christian Ulrich I, Duke of Württemberg-Oels (Württemberg)	21 January 1698	18 February 1721	16 February 1728 husband's accession	1732 divorce	4 January 1739	George Albert
In 1739, the line of Saxe-Weissenfels-Barby became extinct and their land were reincorporated into the Duchy of Saxe-Weissenfels.
Duchess of Saxe-Weissenfels-Dahme
	Emilie Agnes Reuss of Schleiz	Heinrich I, Count Reuss of Schleiz (Reuss-Schleiz)	11 August 1667	13 February 1711		16 April 1715 husband's death	15 October 1729	Frederick
In 1715, the line of Saxe-Weissenfels-Dahme became extinct and their land were reincorporated into the Duchy of Saxe-Weissenfels.

=== Duchess of Saxe-Merseburg ===
Duchess of Saxe-Merseburg
Picture	Name	Father	Birth	Marriage	Became Duchess	Ceased to be Duchess	Death	Husband
	Christiana of Schleswig-Holstein-Sonderburg-Glücksburg	Philip, Duke of Schleswig-Holstein-Sonderburg-Glücksburg (Schleswig-Holstein-Sonderburg-Glücksburg)	22 September 1634	19 November 1650	22 April 1657 husband's accession	18 October 1691 husband's death	20 May 1701	Christian I
	Erdmuthe Dorothea of Saxe-Zeitz	Maurice, Duke of Saxe-Zeitz (Wettin)	13 November 1661	14 October 1679	18 October 1691 husband's accession	20 October 1694 husband's death	29 April 1720	Christian II
	Henriette Charlotte of Nassau-Idstein	George August, Count of Nassau-Idstein (Nassau-Idstein)	9 November 1693	4 November 1711		21 April 1731 husband's death	8 April 1734	Maurice William
	Elisabeth of Mecklenburg-Güstrow	Gustav Adolf, Duke of Mecklenburg-Güstrow (Mecklenburg-Güstrow)	3 September 1668	29 March 1692	21 April 1731 husband's accession	28 July 1738 husband's death	25 August 1738	Henry
In 1738, the line of Saxe-Merseburg became extinct and their land were reincorporated into the Electorate.
Duchess of Saxe-Merseburg-Zörbig
	Hedwig of Mecklenburg-Güstrow	Gustav Adolf, Duke of Mecklenburg-Güstrow (Mecklenburg-Güstrow)	12 January 1666	1 December 1686	1691 husband's accession	27 March 1715 husband's death	9 August 1735	August
In 1715, the line of Saxe-Merseburg-Zörbig became extinct and their land were reincorporated into the Duchy of Saxe-Merseburg.
Duchess of Saxe-Merseburg-Lauchstädt
	Eleonore Sophie of Saxe-Weimar	Johann Ernst II, Duke of Saxe-Weimar (Wettin)	22 March 1660	9 July 1684		4 February 1687		Philipp
	Louise Elisabeth of Württemberg-Oels	Christian Ulrich I, Duke of Württemberg-Oels (Württemberg)	22 February 1673	17 August 1688		1 July 1690 husband's death	28 April 1736	Philipp
In 1690, the line of Saxe-Merseburg-Lauchstädt became extinct and their land were reincorporated into the Duchy of Saxe-Merseburg.
Duchess of Saxe-Merseburg-Spremberg
	Elisabeth of Mecklenburg-Güstrow	Gustav Adolf, Duke of Mecklenburg-Güstrow (Mecklenburg-Güstrow)	3 September 1668	29 March 1692	1694 husband's accession	21 April 1731 became Duchess of Saxe-Merseburg	25 August 1738	Henry

=== Duchess of Saxe-Zeitz ===
Duchess of Saxe-Zeitz
Picture	Name	Father	Birth	Marriage	Became Duchess	Ceased to be Duchess	Death	Husband
	Dorothea Maria of Saxe-Weimar	Wilhelm, Duke of Saxe-Weimar (Wettin)	14 October 1641	3 July 1656	22 April 1657 husband's accession	11 June 1675		Maurice
	Sophie Elisabeth of Schleswig-Holstein-Sonderburg-Wiesenburg	Philipp Louis, Duke Schleswig-Holstein-Sonderburg-Wiesenburg (Schleswig-Holstein-Sonderburg-Wiesenburg)	4 May 1653	14 June 1676		4 December 1681 husband's death	19 August 1684	Maurice
	Marie Amalie of Brandenburg	Frederick William I, Elector of Brandenburg (Hohenzollern)	16 November 1670	25 June 1689		15 November 1718 husband's death	17 November 1739	Maurice William
In 1718, the line of Saxe-Zeitz became extinct and their land were reincorporated into the Electorate.
Duchess of Saxe-Zeitz-Pegau-Neustadt
	Sophie Angelika of Württemberg-Oels	Christian Ulrich I, Duke of Württemberg-Oels (Württemberg)	30 May 1677	23 April 1699	after 23 April 1699 husband receives appanage	11 November 1700		Frederick Henry
	Anna Fredericka Philippine of Schleswig-Holstein-Sonderburg-Wiesenburg	Philipp Louis, Duke Schleswig-Holstein-Sonderburg-Wiesenburg (Schleswig-Holstein-Sonderburg-Wiesenburg)	4 July 1665	27 February 1702		18 December 1713 husband's death	25 February 1748	Frederick Henry
In 1718, the line of Saxe-Zeitz-Pegau-Neustadt became extinct, after Duke Maurice Adolf Karl became a priest, and their land were reincorporated into the Duchy of Saxe-Zeitz.

== Ernestine Saxony ==
=== Duchess of Saxe-Weimar ===
Picture	Name	Father	Birth	Marriage	Became Duchess	Ceased to be Duchess	Death	Husband
	Dorothea Susanne of the Palatinate	Frederick III, Elector Palatine (Wittelsbach)	15 November 1544	15 June 1560	1572; Saxe-Weimar created	2 March 1573 husband's death	8 April 1592	John William
	Sophie of Württemberg	Christoph, Duke of Württemberg (Württemberg)	20 November 1563	5 May 1583		21 July 1590		Frederick William I
	Anna Maria of the Palatinate-Neuburg	Philip Louis, Count Palatine of Neuburg (Wittelsbach)	18 August 1575	9 September 1591		7 July 1602 husband's death	11 February 1643	Frederick William I
	Dorothea Maria of Anhalt	Joachim Ernest, Prince of Anhalt (Ascania)	2 July 1574	7 January 1593	7 July 1602 husband's accession	18 July 1605 husband's death	18 July 1617	John
	Eleonore Dorothea of Anhalt-Dessau	John George I, Prince of Anhalt-Dessau (Ascania)	16 February 1602	23 May 1625		17 May 1662 husband's death	26 December 1664	William
	Christine Elisabeth of Schleswig-Holstein-Sonderburg	John Christian, Duke of Schleswig-Holstein-Sonderburg (Schleswig-Holstein-Sonderburg)	23 June 1638	14 August 1656	17 May 1662 husband's accession	7 June 1679		John Ernest II
	Charlotte Marie of Saxe-Jena	Bernhard II, Duke of Saxe-Jena (Saxe-Jena)	20 December 1669	2 November 1683		23 August 1690 divorce	6 January 1703	William Ernest co-Duke
	Sophie Auguste of Anhalt-Zerbst	John VI, Prince of Anhalt-Zerbst (Ascania)	9 March 1663	11 October 1685		14 September 1694		John Ernest III co-Duke
	Charlotte of Hesse-Homburg	Frederick II, Landgrave of Hesse-Homburg (Hesse-Homburg)	17 June 1672	4 November 1694		10 May 1707 husband's death	29 August 1738	John Ernest III co-Duke
	Eleonore Wilhelmine of Anhalt-Köthen	Emmanuel Lebrecht, Prince of Anhalt-Köthen (Ascania)	29 November 1694	24 January 1716		29 September 1728		Ernest Augustus I
	Sophie Charlotte of Brandenburg-Bayreuth	George Frederick Charles, Margrave of Brandenburg-Bayreuth (Hohenzollern)	27 July 1713	7 April 1734		2 March 1747		Ernest Augustus I
	Anna Amalia of Brunswick-Wolfenbüttel	Charles I, Duke of Brunswick-Wolfenbüttel (Brunswick-Bevern)	24 October 1739	16 March 1756		28 May 1758 husband's death	10 April 1807	Ernest Augustus II
	Louise of Hesse-Darmstadt	Louis IX, Landgrave of Hesse-Darmstadt (Hesse-Darmstadt)	30 January 1757	3 October 1775		1809; Weimar and Eisenach united	14 February 1830	Charles Augustus

=== Duchess of Saxe-Coburg-Eisenach ===
Picture	Name	Father	Birth	Marriage	Became Duchess	Ceased to be Duchess	Death	Husband
	Elisabeth of Mansfeld-Hinterort	John, Count of Mansfeld-Hinterort (Mansfeld)	1565	23 November 1591		12 April 1596		John Ernest
	Anna of Saxony	Augustus, Elector of Saxony (Wettin)	16 November 1567	16 January 1586		12 December 1593 divorce	27 January 1613	John Casimir

=== Duchess of Saxe-Coburg ===
First Creation
Picture	Name	Father	Birth	Marriage	Became Duchess	Ceased to be Duchess	Death	Husband
	Margaret of Brunswick-Lüneburg	William the Younger, Duke of Brunswick-Lüneburg (Welf)	6 April 1573	16 September 1599		16 July 1633 husband's death	7 August 1643	John Casimir
	Christine of Hesse-Kassel	William IV, Landgrave of Hesse-Kassel (Hesse-Kassel)	19 October 1578	14 May 1598	16 July 1633 husband's accession	23 October 1638 husband's death	19 August 1658	John Ernest
Second Creation
	Marie Elisabeth of Brunswick-Wolfenbüttel	Augustus the Younger, Duke of Brunswick-Lüneburg (Welf)	7 January 1638	18 July 1676	1680 husband's accession	15 February 1687		Albert V

=== Duchess of Saxe-Eisenach ===
First Creation
Picture	Name	Father	Birth	Marriage	Became Duchess	Ceased to be Duchess	Death	Husband
	Christine of Hesse-Kassel	William IV, Landgrave of Hesse-Kassel (Hesse-Kassel)	19 October 1578	14 May 1598		23 October 1638 husband's death	19 August 1658	John Ernest
Second Creation
	Dorothea of Saxe-Altenburg	Frederick William I, Duke of Saxe-Weimar (Wettin)	26 June 1601	24 June 1633	1640; Saxe-Eisenach partitioned from Weimar	20 December 1644 husband's death	10 April 1675	Albert IV
Third Creation
	Marie Elisabeth of Brunswick-Wolfenbüttel	Augustus the Younger, Duke of Brunswick-Lüneburg (Welf)	7 January 1638	18 January 1663		22 November 1668 husband's death	15 February 1687	Adolf William
	Johannetta of Sayn-Wittgenstein	Ernest, Count of Sayn-Wittgenstein (Sayn-Wittgenstein)	27 August 1632	29 May 1661	23 February 1671 husband's accession	19 September 1686 husband's death	28 September 1701	John George I
	Sophie Charlotte of Württemberg	Eberhard III, Duke of Württemberg (Württemberg)	22 February 1671	20 September 1688		10 November 1698 husband's death	11 September 1717	John George II
	Christine Juliane of Baden-Durlach	Margrave Charles Gustav of Baden-Durlach (Zähringen)	12 September 1678	27 February 1697	10 November 1698 husband's accession	10 July 1707		John William III
	Magdalene Sibylle of Saxe-Weissenfels	Johann Adolf I, Duke of Saxe-Weissenfels (Wettin)	3 September 1673	28 July 1708		28 November 1726		John William III
	Marie Christine Felizitas of Leiningen-Dagsburg-Falkenburg-Heidesheim	Johann Karl August, Count of Leiningen-Dagsburg (Leiningen-Dagsburg-Falkenburg-Heidesheim)	29 December 1692	29 May 1727		14 January 1729 husband's death	3 June 1734	John William III
	Anna Sophie Charlotte of Brandenburg-Schwedt	Margrave Albert Frederick of Brandenburg-Schwedt (Hohenzollern)	24 December 1706	3 June 1723	14 January 1729 husband's accession	26 July 1741 husband's death	3 January 1751	William Henry
	Sophie Charlotte of Brandenburg-Bayreuth	George Frederick Charles, Margrave of Brandenburg-Bayreuth (Hohenzollern)	27 July 1713	7 April 1734	26 July 1741 husband's accession	2 March 1747		Ernest Augustus I
	Anna Amalia of Brunswick-Wolfenbüttel	Charles I, Duke of Brunswick-Wolfenbüttel (Brunswick-Bevern)	24 October 1739	16 March 1756		28 May 1758 husband's death	10 April 1807	Ernest Augustus II
	Louise of Hesse-Darmstadt	Louis IX, Landgrave of Hesse-Darmstadt (Hesse-Darmstadt)	30 January 1757	3 October 1775		1809; Weimar and Eisenach united	14 February 1830	Charles Augustus

=== Duchess of Saxe-Altenburg ===
First Creation
Picture	Name	Father	Birth	Marriage	Became Duchess	Ceased to be Duchess	Death	Husband
	Elisabeth of Brünswick-Wolfenbüttel	Henry Julius, Duke of Brunswick-Lüneburg (Welf)	23 June 1593	25 October 1618		1 April 1639 husband's death	25 March 1650	John Philip
	Sophie Elisabeth of Brandenburg	Margrave Christian William of Brandenburg (Hohenzollern)	1 February 1616	18 September 1638	1 April 1639 husband accession	16 March 1650		Frederick William II
	Magdalene Sibylle of Saxony	John George I, Elector of Saxony (Wettin)	23 December 1617	11 October 1652		6 January 1668		Frederick William II
	Elisabeth Sophie of Saxe-Altenburg	John Philip, Duke of Saxe-Altenburg (Saxe-Altenburg)	10 October 1619	24 October 1636	14 April 1672 husband accession	26 March 1675 husband's death	20 December 1680	Ernest I
Second Creation
	Amelia of Württemberg	Duke Louis of Württemberg (Württemberg)	28 June 1799	24 April 1817	29 September 1834 husband's accession	28 November 1848		Joseph
	Marie Louise of Mecklenburg-Schwerin	Frederick Louis, Hereditary Grand Duke of Mecklenburg-Schwerin (Mecklenburg-Schwerin)	31 March 1803	7 October 1825	30 November 1848 husband accession	3 August 1853 husband's death	26 October 1862	George
	Agnes of Anhalt-Dessau	Leopold IV, Duke of Anhalt (Ascania)	24 June 1824	28 April 1853	3 August 1853 husband accession	23 October 1897		Ernest I
	Adelaide of Schaumburg-Lippe	Prince William of Schaumburg-Lippe (Schaumburg-Lippe)	22 September 1875	27 February 1898	7 February 1908 husband accession	13 November 1918; German Revolution	27 January 1971	Ernest II

=== Duchess of Saxe-Gotha ===
Picture	Name	Father	Birth	Marriage	Became Duchess	Ceased to be Duchess	Death	Husband
	Elisabeth Sophie of Saxe-Altenburg	John Philip, Duke of Saxe-Altenburg (Saxe-Altenburg)	10 October 1619	24 October 1636	1640 husband accession	26 March 1675 husband's death	20 December 1680	Ernest I

=== Duchess of Saxe-Gotha-Altenburg ===
Duchess of Saxe-Gotha and Altenburg
Picture	Name	Father	Birth	Marriage	Became Duchess	Ceased to be Duchess	Death	Husband
	Elisabeth Sophie of Saxe-Altenburg	John Philip, Duke of Saxe-Altenburg (Saxe-Altenburg)	10 October 1619	24 October 1636	14 April 1672 personal union of Altenburg and Gotha	26 March 1675 husband's death	20 December 1680	Ernest I
Duchess of Saxe-Gotha-Altenburg
	Magdalena Sibylle of Saxe-Weissenfels	August, Duke of Saxe-Weissenfels (Saxe-Weissenfels)	2 September 1648	14 November 1669	26 March 1675 husband accession	7 January 1681		Frederick I
	Christine of Baden-Durlach	Frederick VI, Margrave of Baden-Durlach (Zähringen)	22 April 1645	14 August 1681		2 August 1691 husband's death	21 December 1705	Frederick I
	Magdalena Augusta of Anhalt-Zerbst	Karl, Prince of Anhalt-Zerbst (Ascania)	13 October 1679	7 June 1696		23 March 1732 husband's death	11 October 1740	Frederick II
	Luise Dorothea of Saxe-Meiningen	Ernest Louis I, Duke of Saxe-Meiningen (Saxe-Meiningen)	10 August 1710	17 September 1729	23 March 1732 husband's accession	22 October 1767		Frederick III
	Charlotte of Saxe-Meiningen	Anton Ulrich, Duke of Saxe-Meiningen (Saxe-Meiningen)	11 September 1751	21 March 1769	10 March 1772 husband's accession	20 April 1804 husband's death	25 April 1827	Ernest II
	Caroline Amalie of Hesse-Kassel	William I, Elector of Hesse (Hesse-Kassel)	11 July 1771	24 April 1802	20 April 1804 husband's accession	27 May 1822 husband's death	22 February 1848	Augustus

=== Duchess of Saxe-Marksuhl ===
Picture	Name	Father	Birth	Marriage	Became Duchess	Ceased to be Duchess	Death	Husband
	Johannetta of Sayn-Wittgenstein	Ernest, Count of Sayn-Wittgenstein (Sayn-Wittgenstein)	27 August 1632	29 May 1661	17 May 1662 husband's accession	23 February 1671; Union of Marksuhl and Eisenach	28 September 1701	John George I

=== Duchess of Saxe-Jena ===
Picture	Name	Father	Birth	Marriage	Became Duchess	Ceased to be Duchess	Death	Husband
	Marie Charlotte de la Trémoille	Henri de La Trémoille (La Trémoille)	26 January 1632	18 July 1662	1672 husband's accession	3 May 1678 husband's death	24 August 1682	Bernhard II

=== Duchess of Saxe-Eisenberg ===
Picture	Name	Father	Birth	Marriage	Became Duchess	Ceased to be Duchess	Death	Husband
	Christiane of Saxe-Merseburg	Christian I, Duke of Saxe-Merseburg (Wettin)	1 June 1659	13 February 1677		13 March 1679		Christian
	Sophie Marie of Hesse-Darmstadt	Louis VI, Landgrave of Hesse-Darmstadt (Hesse-Darmstadt)	7 May 1661	9 February 1681		28 April 1707 husband's death	22 August 1712	Christian

=== Duchess of Saxe-Hildburghausen ===
Picture	Name	Father	Birth	Marriage	Became Duchess	Ceased to be Duchess	Death	Husband
	Sophie Henriette of Waldeck	Prince Georg Friedrich of Waldeck (Waldeck)	3 August 1662	30 November 1680		15 October 1702		Ernest
	Sophia Albertine of Erbach-Erbach	Georg Ludwig I, Count of Erbach-Erbach (Erbach-Erbach)	30 July 1683	4 February 1704	17 October 1715 husband's accession	9 March 1724 husband's death	4 September 1742	Ernest Frederick I
	Caroline of Erbach-Fürstenau	Philipp Karl, Count of Erbach-Fürstenau (Erbach-Fürstenau)	29 September 1700	19 June 1726		13 August 1745 husband's death	7 May 1758	Ernest Frederick II
	Louise of Denmark	Christian VI of Denmark (Oldenburg)	19 October 1726	1 October 1749		8 August 1756		Ernest Frederick III
	Christiane Sophie Charlotte of Brandenburg-Bayreuth	Frederick Christian, Margrave of Brandenburg-Bayreuth (Hohenzollern)	15 October 1733	20 January 1757		8 October 1757		Ernest Frederick III
	Ernestine of Saxe-Weimar	Ernest Augustus I, Duke of Saxe-Weimar-Eisenach (Saxe-Weimar)	4 January 1740	1 July 1758		23 September 1780 husband's death	10 June 1786	Ernest Frederick III
	Charlotte Georgine of Mecklenburg-Strelitz	Charles II, Grand Duke of Mecklenburg (Mecklenburg-Strelitz)	17 November 1769	3 September 1785		14 May 1818		Frederick

=== Duchess of Saxe-Römhild ===
Picture	Name	Father	Birth	Marriage	Became Duchess	Ceased to be Duchess	Death	Husband
	Marie Elisabeth of Hesse-Darmstadt	Louis VI, Landgrave of Hesse-Darmstadt (Hesse-Darmstadt)	11 March 1656	1 March 1676		13 May 1710 husband's death	16 August 1715	Henry

=== Duchess of Saxe-Saalfeld ===
Picture	Name	Father	Birth	Marriage	Became Duchess	Ceased to be Duchess	Death	Husband
	Sophie Hedwig of Saxe-Merseburg	Christian I, Duke of Saxe-Merseburg (Saxe-Merseburg)	4 August 1660	18 February 1680		2 August 1686		John Ernest IV
	Charlotte Johanna of Waldeck-Wildungen	Josias II, Count of Waldeck-Wildungen (Waldeck)	13 December 1664	2 December 1690		1 February 1699		John Ernest IV

=== Duchess of Saxe-Meiningen ===
Picture	Name	Father	Birth	Marriage	Became Duchess	Ceased to be Duchess	Death	Husband
	Marie Hedwig of Hesse-Darmstadt	George II, Landgrave of Hesse-Darmstadt (Hesse-Darmstadt)	26 November 1647	20 November 1671	26 March 1675 husband's accession	19 April 1680		Bernhard I
	Elisabeth Eleonore of Brunswick-Wolfenbüttel	Anthony Ulrich, Duke of Brunswick-Wolfenbüttel (Welf)	30 September 1658	25 January 1681		27 April 1706 husband's death	15 March 1729	Bernhard I
	Dorothea Marie of Saxe-Gotha-Altenburg	Frederick I, Duke of Saxe-Gotha-Altenburg (Saxe-Gotha-Altenburg)	22 January 1674	19 September 1704	27 April 1706 husband's accession	18 April 1713		Ernst Ludwig I
	Elisabeth Sophie of Brandenburg	Frederick William, Elector of Brandenburg (Hohenzollern)	5 April 1674	3 June 1714		24 November 1724 husband's death	22 November 1748	Ernst Ludwig I
	Charlotte Amalie of Hesse-Philippsthal	Charles I, Landgrave of Hesse-Philippsthal (Hesse-Philippsthal)	11 August 1730	26 September 1750		27 January 1763 husband's death	7 September 1801	Anton Ulrich
	Louise of Stolberg-Gedern	Christian Karl, Prince of Stolberg-Gedern (Stolberg-Gedern)	13 October 1764	5 June 1780		21 July 1782 husband's death	24 May 1834	Charles William
	Louise Eleonore of Hohenlohe-Langenburg	Christian Albert, Prince of Hohenlohe-Langenburg (Hohenlohe-Langenburg)	11 August 1763	27 November 1782		24 December 1803 husband's death	30 April 1837	George I
	Marie Fredericka of Hesse-Kassel	William II, Elector of Hesse (Hesse-Kassel)	6 September 1804	23 March 1825		20 September 1866 husband's abdication	4 January 1888	Bernhard II
	Feodora of Hohenlohe-Langenburg	Ernst I, Prince of Hohenlohe-Langenburg (Hohenlohe-Langenburg)	7 July 1839	23 October 1858	20 September 1866 husband's accession	30 March 1872		George II
	Charlotte of Prussia	Frederick III, German Emperor (Hohenzollern)	24 July 1860	18 February 1878	25 June 1914 husband's accession	10 November 1918 husband's abdication	1 October 1919	Bernhard III

=== Duchess of Saxe-Coburg-Saalfeld ===
Picture	Name	Father	Birth	Marriage	Became Duchess	Ceased to be Duchess	Death	Husband
	Anna Sophie of Schwarzburg-Rudolstadt	Louis Frederick I, Prince of Schwarzburg-Rudolstadt (Schwarzburg-Rudolstadt)	9 September 1700	2 January 1723	4 September 1745 husband's accession	16 September 1764 husband's death	11 December 1780	Francis Josias
	Sophia Antonia of Brunswick-Wolfenbüttel	Ferdinand Albert II, Duke of Brunswick-Lüneburg (Brunswick-Bevern)	3 January 1724	23 April 1749	16 September 1764 husband's accession	8 September 1800 husband's death	17 March 1802	Ernest Frederick
	Augusta Reuss of Ebersdorf	Heinrich XXIV, Count of Reuss-Ebersdorf (Reuss-Ebersdorf)	19 January 1757	13 June 1777	8 September 1800 husband's accession	9 December 1806 husband's death	16 November 1831	Francis
	Louise of Saxe-Gotha-Altenburg	Augustus, Duke of Saxe-Gotha-Altenburg (Saxe-Gotha-Altenburg)	21 December 1800	31 July 1817		31 March 1826 divorce	16 November 1831	Ernest III

=== Duchess of Saxe-Coburg and Gotha ===
Picture	Name	Father	Birth	Marriage	Became Duchess	Ceased to be Duchess	Death	Husband
	Marie of Württemberg	Duke Alexander of Württemberg (Württemberg)	17 September 1799	23 December 1832		29 January 1844 husband's death	24 September 1860	Ernest I
	Alexandrine of Baden	Leopold, Grand Duke of Baden (Zähringen)	6 December 1820	13 May 1842	29 January 1844 husband's accession	22 August 1893 husband's death	20 December 1904	Ernest II
	Maria Alexandrovna of Russia	Alexander II of Russia (Holstein-Gottorp-Romanov)	17 October 1853	23 January 1874	22 August 1893 husband's accession	30 July 1900 husband's death	24 October 1920	Alfred
	Victoria Adelaide of Schleswig-Holstein	Friedrich Ferdinand, Duke of Schleswig-Holstein (Schleswig-Holstein-Sonderburg-Glücksburg)	31 December 1885	11 October 1905		14 November 1918; German Revolution	3 October 1970	Charles Edward

=== Duchess of Saxe-Weimar-Eisenach ===
Picture	Name	Father	Birth	Marriage	Became Duchess	Ceased to be Duchess	Death	Husband
	Louise of Hesse-Darmstadt	Louis IX, Landgrave of Hesse-Darmstadt (Hesse-Darmstadt)	30 January 1757	3 October 1775	1809; Weimar and Eisenach united	21 April 1815 become Grand Duchess	14 February 1830	Charles Augustus

=== Grand Duchess of Saxe-Weimar-Eisenach ===
Picture	Name	Father	Birth	Marriage	Became Grand Duchess	Ceased to be Grand Duchess	Death	Husband
	Louise of Hesse-Darmstadt	Louis IX, Landgrave of Hesse-Darmstadt (Hesse-Darmstadt)	30 January 1757	3 October 1775	1815 elevated to Grand Duchess	14 June 1828 husband's death	14 February 1830	Charles Augustus
	Maria Pavlovna of Russia	Paul I of Russia (Holstein-Gottorp-Romanov)	16 February 1786	3 August 1804	14 June 1828 husband's accession	8 July 1853 husband's death	23 June 1859	Charles Frederick
	Sophie of the Netherlands	William II of the Netherlands (Orange-Nassau)	8 April 1824	8 October 1842	8 July 1853 husband's accession	23 March 1897		Charles Alexander
	Caroline Reuss of Greiz	Heinrich XXII, Prince Reuss of Greiz (Reuss-Greiz)	13 July 1884	30 April 1903		17 January 1905		William Ernest
	Feodora of Saxe-Meiningen	Prince Friedrich of Saxe-Meiningen (Saxe-Meiningen)	29 May 1890	21 January 1910		9 November 1918; Grand Duchy abolished	12 March 1972	William Ernest

== Royal Saxony ==
=== Queen of Saxony ===
Picture	Name	Father	Birth	Marriage	Became Queen	Ceased to be Queen	Death	Husband
	Amalie of Zweibrücken-Birkenfeld	Frederick Michael, Count Palatine of Zweibrücken (Palatinate-Birkenfeld)	10 May 1752	29 January 1769	20 December 1806 elevated to Queen consort	5 May 1827 husband's death	15 November 1828	Frederick Augustus I
	Maria Theresa of Austria	Leopold II, Holy Roman Emperor (Habsburg-Lorraine)	30 January 1757	8 October 1787	5 May 1827 husband's accession	7 November 1827		Anthony
	Maria Anna of Bavaria	Maximilian I Joseph of Bavaria (Wittelsbach)	27 January 1805	24 April 1833	6 June 1836 husband's accession	9 August 1854 husband's death	13 September 1877	Frederick Augustus II
	Amalie Auguste of Bavaria	Maximilian I Joseph of Bavaria (Wittelsbach)	13 November 1801	22 November 1822	9 August 1854 husband's accession	29 October 1873 husband's death	8 November 1877	John
	Carola of Vasa	Gustavus, Crown Prince of Sweden (Holstein-Gottorp)	5 August 1833	18 June 1853	29 October 1873 husband's accession	19 June 1902 husband's death	15 December 1907	Albert
