= Charlotte Marie of Saxe-Jena =

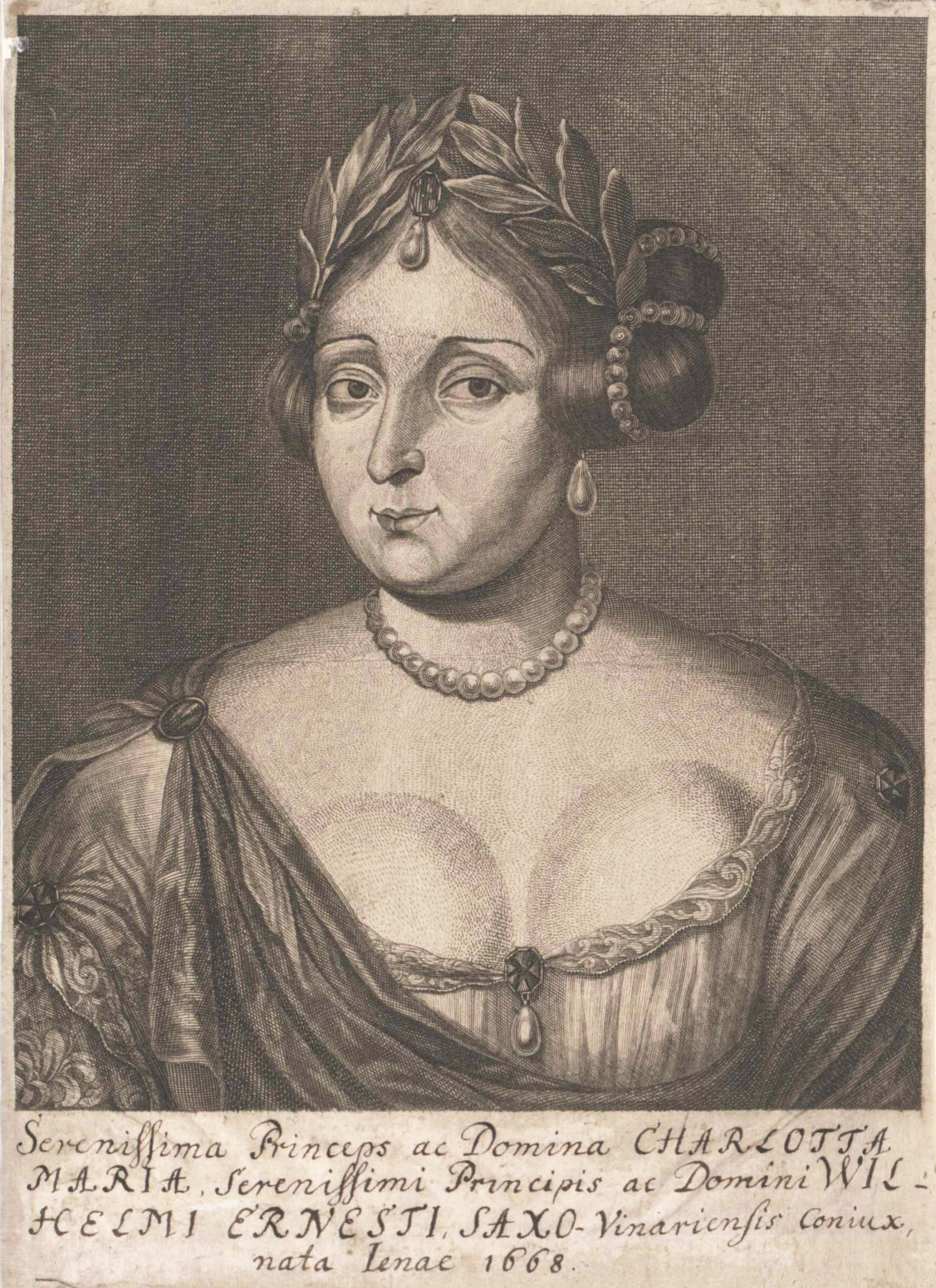

Duchess consort of Saxe-Weimar
- Tenure: 1683–1690
- Born: 20 December 1669; Jena
- Died: 6 January 1703 (aged 33); Gräfentonna
- Spouse: Wilhelm Ernst, Duke of Saxe-Weimar
- House: House of Wettin
- Father: Bernhard II, Duke of Saxe-Jena
- Mother: Marie Charlotte de la Trémoille

Charlotte Marie of Saxe-Jena (20 December 1669, in Jena – 6 January 1703, in Gräfentonna) was a German princess member of the House of Wettin in the branch of Saxe-Jena and by marriage Duchess of Saxe-Weimar.

She was the fourth child of Bernhard II, Duke of Saxe-Jena by his wife Marie Charlotte, daughter of Henry de La Trémoille, 3rd Duke of Thouars, 2nd Duke of La Tremoille, and Prince of Talmond and Taranto. The early death of her two brothers and older sister before her own birth left Charlotte Marie as the only child of her parents for several years, until the birth of her younger brother and future 2nd Duke of Saxe-Jena, Johann Wilhelm in 1675.

== Life ==
After the early deaths of her father (3 May 1678) and her mother (24 August 1682) Charlotte Marie and her brother were placed under the guardianship of their uncle, Johann Ernst II, Duke of Saxe-Weimar, under the provisions of the will of the late Duke Bernhard II; however, Duke Johann Ernst II died soon after (15 May 1683) and the tutelage of the two youngsters was given to another uncle, Johann Georg I, Duke of Saxe-Eisenach.

Six months later, on 2 November 1683, at the age of 14, Charlotte Marie married with her cousin Wilhelm Ernst, Duke of Saxe-Weimar, son and successor of the former regent Johann Ernst II. The dowry provided for her in Duke Bernhard II's will was so small that Wilhelm Ernst refused to claim it after the wedding.

Three years later (19 September 1686), Duke Johann Georg I died in a hunting accident and Wilhelm Ernst took the guardianship of the still underage Duke of Saxe-Jena, as his closest male relative (first cousin and brother-in-law).

Charlotte Marie was described as extremely beautiful and well brought up, but also superficial and reckless. Her marriage with Wilhelm Ernst remained childless and was marked by frequent clashes between them. When the Duchess made a journey without the permission of her husband, Wilhelm Ernst captured her and confined her in Weimar. Finally, on 23 August 1690 the marriage was formally dissolved.

At first, Charlotte Marie went to live with her brother in Jena, but after his death two months later (4 November 1690), she was forced to flee. Penniless and in debt, she wandered until Frederick I, Duke of Saxe-Gotha-Altenburg finally allowed her to reside in his lands permanently. The dispute with her former husband about the town of Porstendorf came before Emperor Leopold I and was decided in favor of Charlotte Marie, who sold the town in 1694 to Eisenach's secret council and court marshal Georg Ludwig von Wurmb (1643–1721) for 32,000 Mfl. in order to pay her debts. She lived on a pension at the Gotha court and was involved in other legal proceedings against the House of Saxe-Weimar when she died in 1703, aged 33. She was buried in the Herderkirche (Church of St. Peter und Paul) in Weimar.

== Bibliography ==
- Johann Samuel Ersch: Allgemeine Encyclopädie der Wissenschaften und Künste, Second Section, Leipzig 1838, p. 221 (Digitalisat).

Charlotte Marie of Saxe-Jena House of Wettin Born: 20 December 1669 Died: 6 January 1703
German royalty
| Vacant Title last held by Christine Elisabeth of Holstein-Sonderburg | Duchess consort of Saxe-Weimar; 1683–1690 jointly with Sophie Auguste of Anhalt-Zerbst since 1685 | Succeeded by Sophie Auguste of Anhalt-Zerbst |
