= Ernest Augustus I of Saxe-Weimar-Eisenach =

Ernest Augustus I
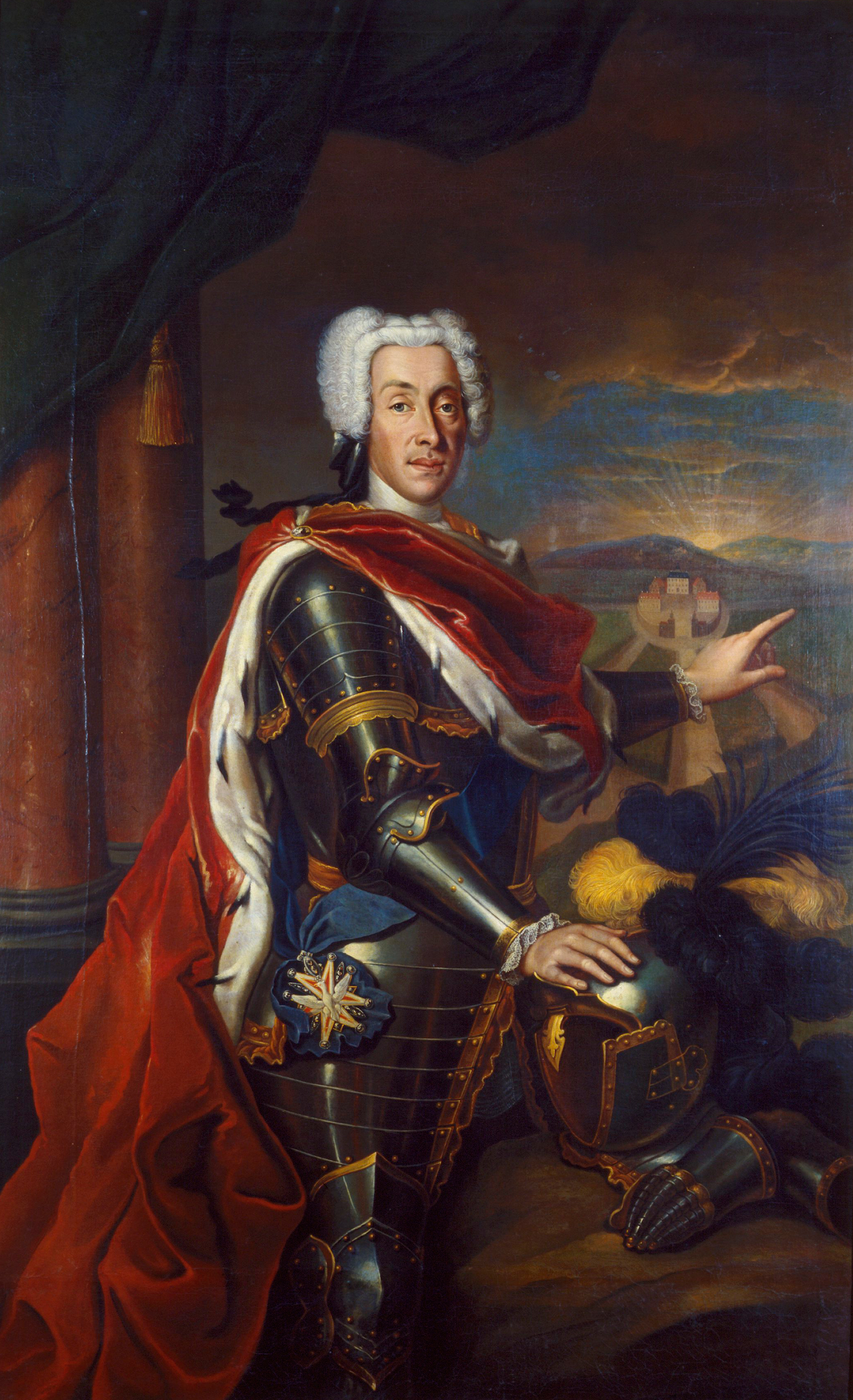
- 18th-century portrait

Duke of Saxe-Weimar
- Reign: 1707–1748
- Predecessor: Wilhelm Ernst with John Ernst III
- Successor: Ernest Augustus II
- Co-ruler: Wilhelm Ernst

Duke of Saxe-Eisenach
- Reign: 1741–1748
- Predecessor: Wilhelm Heinrich
- Successor: Ernest Augustus II
- Born: 19 April 1688; Weimar
- Died: 19 January 1748 (aged 59); Eisenach
- Spouse: Eleonore Wilhelmine of Anhalt-Köthen (m. 1716; died 1726) Sophie Charlotte of Brandenburg-Bayreuth (m. 1734; died 1747)
- Issue: Wilhelm Ernst, Hereditary Prince of Saxe-Weimar; Princess Wilhelmine Auguste; Johann Wilhelm, Hereditary Prince of Saxe-Weimar; Princess Charlotte Agnes Leopoldina; Princess Johanna Eleonore Henriette; Ernestine Albertine, Countess of Lippe-Alverdissen; Bernhardina, Princess of Schwarzburg-Rudolstadt; Prince Emmanuel Frederick; Karl August Eugen, Hereditary Prince of Saxe-Weimar; Ernest Augustus II, Duke of Saxe-Weimar-Eisenach; Princess Eleonore Christiane; Princess Johanna Auguste; Ernestine, Duchess of Saxe-Hildburghausen; Prince Ernst Adolf
- House: Wettin (Ernestine line) (by birth); Saxe-Weimar-Eisenach (founder)
- Father: Johann Ernst III, Duke of Saxe-Weimar
- Mother: Sophie Auguste of Anhalt-Zerbst

Ernst August I, Duke of Saxe-Weimar (German: Ernst August I; 19 April 1688 – 19 January 1748), was a duke of Saxe-Weimar and, from 1741, of Saxe-Weimar-Eisenach.

== Biography ==
He was the second but eldest surviving son of Johann Ernst III, Duke of Saxe-Weimar and his first wife Sophie Auguste of Anhalt-Zerbst.

When his father died in 1707, Ernst August became co-ruler (Mitherr) of Saxe-Weimar, along with his uncle Wilhelm Ernst, but his title was only nominal, since Wilhelm Ernst was the actual ruler of the duchy. Only when Wilhelm Ernst died in 1728 did Ernst August begin to exercise true authority over Saxe-Weimar.

=== Excesses ===
Ernst August was a splendor-loving ruler, and his extravagances contributed to the eventual financial ruin of his duchy. Desperately in need of funds, he resorted to the practice of arresting wealthy subjects without cause, and setting them free only after they had renounced their fortunes to the duke, or had paid exorbitant ransoms. Some of the victims, who considered this behaviour illegal, made claims against the duke at the Imperial Court in Vienna or in the Imperial Chamber Court of Appeal in Wetzlar. Ernst August lost all the legal proceedings mounted against him. The process lasted for many years and eventually led to the duchy's bankruptcy.

The duke maintained a standing army that was disproportionately large for the duchy's population or financial resources. Some of the soldiers were rented to the Electorate of Saxony or to the Holy Roman Emperor. Ernst August's mania for building led to the construction of the Kleinode, the small Schloss Belvedere and the Rococo Schloss of Dornburg, a lavish residence for the duke. His passion for the hunt was likewise extravagant; when he died, Ernst August left 1,100 dogs and 373 horses. The duke maintained a standing "harem," in which two noble "Ladies of Honour" (Ehrenfräulein) and three "Chamber Women" (Kammerfrauen) of low birth attended to his desires.

=== Marriages and children ===
In Nienburg on 24 January 1716, Ernst August married Eleonore Wilhelmine of Anhalt-Köthen, daughter of Emmanuel Lebrecht, Prince of Anhalt-Köthen. They had eight children:

1. William Ernest (b. Weimar, 4 July 1717 – d. Halle, 8 June 1719), Hereditary Prince of Saxe-Weimar.
2. Wilhelmine Auguste (b. Weimar, 4 July 1717 – d. Weimar, 9 December 1752), twin of Wilhelm Ernst.
3. John William (b. Weimar, 10 January 1719 – d. Weimar, 6 December 1732), Hereditary Prince of Saxe-Weimar.
4. Charlotte Agnes Leopoldina (b. Weimar, 4 December 1720 – d. Weimar, 15 October 1724).
5. Johanna Eleonore Henriette (b. Weimar, 2 December 1721 – d. Weimar, 17 June 1722).
6. Ernestine Albertine (b. Weimar, 28 December 1722 – d. Alverdissen, 25 November 1769), married on 6 May 1756 to Philipp II, Count of Schaumburg-Lippe.
7. Bernhardina Christina Sophia (b. Weimar, 5 May 1724 – d. Rudolstadt, 5 June 1757), married on 19 November 1744 to John Frederick, Prince of Schwarzburg-Rudolstadt.
8. Emmanuel Frederick William Bernard (b. Weimar, 19 December 1725 – d. Weimar, 11 June 1729).

After the death of his first wife in 1726, the duke decided to not marry again, choosing to live quietly with his Ladies of Honor and Chamber Women. But in 1732 the situation changed unexpectedly: his only surviving son, the hereditary prince (Erbprinz) Johann Wilhelm, died. This made it necessary for him to find a new wife and sire sons in order to perpetuate the dynasty.

In Bayreuth on 7 April 1734, Ernst August married his second wife, Sophie Charlotte of Brandenburg-Bayreuth, daughter of George Frederick Charles, Margrave of Brandenburg-Bayreuth. They had four children:

1. Charles Augustus Eugen (b. Weimar, 1 January 1735 – d. Weimar, 13 September 1736), Hereditary Prince of Saxe-Weimar.
2. Ernst August II Konstantin, Duke of Saxe-Weimar-Eisenach (b. Weimar, 2 June 1737 – d. Weimar, 28 May 1758).
3. Ernestine Auguste Sophie (b. Weimar, 4 January 1740 – d. Hildburghausen, 10 June 1786), married on 1 July 1758 to Ernst Frederick III Karl, Duke of Saxe-Hildburghausen.
4. Ernest Adolph Felix (b. and d. Weimar, 23 January 1741 / b. Weimar, 1742 – d. Weimar, 1743) [?].

The duke also had an illegitimate son with Friederike von Marschall:

1. Ernest Frederick (b. 1731 – d. 1810), created Freiherr von Brenn; married to Beate Helene Bormann, his line died out in the male line in 1849.

=== Saxe-Weimar-Eisenach and absolutism ===
In 1741 the branch of Saxe-Eisenach-Jena became extinct with the death of Wilhelm Heinrich, Duke of Saxe-Eisenach. As the only surviving kinsman of the late duke, Ernst August inherited his estates; the union between Saxe-Weimar and Saxe-Eisenach-Jena now became permanent. One of the duke's few wise decisions was the institution of primogeniture in Saxe-Weimar (confirmed in 1724 by the Emperor Karl VI); this stopped further land divisions in the future. From 1741 his new duchy took the name of Saxe-Weimar-Eisenach (Jena was merged by Eisenach), but the union was only personal at this time. The new state consisted of two larger areas around the two official residences in Weimar and Eisenach, which were not connected, and a patch of smaller areas and towns between them.

The annexation of Saxe-Eisenach was favorable to the hunt-loving duke; he possessed a large swath of woods in the Eisenach region, which seemed suitable to him for hunting. He left the Hereditary Prince in Weimar in the Schloss Belvedere, under the guardianship of his Hofmarschall, and moved permanently to Eisenach. After this, the duke rarely asked for his son, and sent the most unreasonable written instructions from Eisenach to Weimar in order to supervise his son's education. The Hereditary Prince saw his father for the last time in 1743.

Ernst August tried to implement Absolutism in Saxe-Weimar on the French model. The secret Ratskollegium —a consultative organ national formed by nobles—was dissolved. In 1746 the citizens of Eisenach presented the duke a memorandum detailing national prerogatives, in which he was denounced for constant offences against traditional rights. The gesture demonstrated that the citizens of the duchy were resisting the introduction of absolutism, thus certain policies that Ernst August had planned could not be completely carried out. The duke's death prevented a terrible controversy between the national nobles and the citizens of Eisenach.

=== Death ===
Upon his death, Ernst August left a financially ruined duchy, and a successor to the throne (Ernst August II) who was still under age.

== Ancestors ==
Ancestors of Ernest Augustus I of Saxe-Weimar-Eisenach

8. William, Duke of Saxe-Weimar
4. John Ernest II, Duke of Saxe-Weimar
9. Eleonore Dorothea of Anhalt-Dessau
2. John Ernest III, Duke of Saxe-Weimar
10. John Christian, Duke of Schleswig-Holstein-Sonderburg
5. Princess Christine Elisabeth of Schleswig-Holstein-Sonderburg
11. Anna of Oldenburg-Delmenhorst
1. Ernest Augustus I, Duke of Saxe-Weimar-Eisenach
12. Rudolph, Prince of Anhalt-Zerbst
6. John VI, Prince of Anhalt-Zerbst
13. Countess Magdalene of Oldenburg
3. Princess Sophie Auguste of Anhalt-Zerbst
14. Frederick III, Duke of Holstein-Gottorp
7. Sophie Augusta of Holstein-Gottorp
15. Duchess Marie Elisabeth of Saxony

Ernest Augustus I of Saxe-Weimar-Eisenach House of Wettin Born: 19 April 1688 Died: 19 January 1748
Regnal titles
Preceded by Wilhelm Ernst with John Ernest III	Duke of Saxe-Weimar; 1707–1748; With: Wilhelm Ernst (1707–1728)	Succeeded by Ernst August II
Preceded by Wilhelm Heinrich	Duke of Saxe-Eisenach; 1741–1748	Succeeded by Ernst August II
