= Marie Charlotte de La Trémoille =

Duchess of Saxe-Jena (1632–1682)

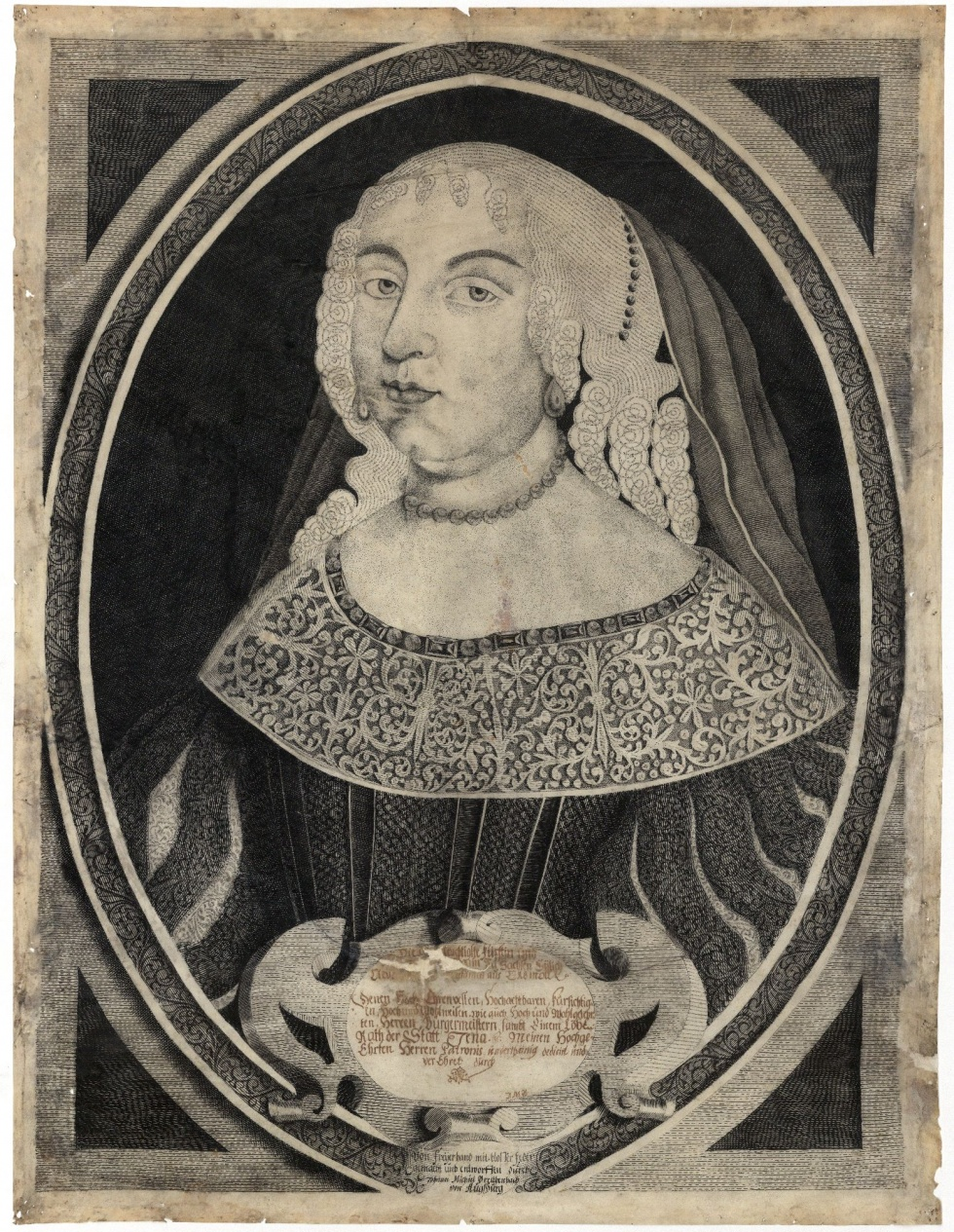
- Marie Charlotte de la Trémoille, Duchess of Saxe-Jena, by Johann Michael Breitenbach. Städtische Museen Jena, Stadtmuseum.

Duchess consort of Saxe-Jena
- Tenure: 1672–1678
- Born: 26 January 1632; Thouars
- Died: 24 August 1682 (aged 50); Jena
- Spouse: Bernhard II, Duke of Saxe-Jena
- Issue: Charlotte Marie, Duchess of Saxe-Weimar; Johann Wilhelm, Duke of Saxe-Jena
- House: La Trémoille
- Father: Henri III de La Trémoille, Duke of Thouars and of La Tremoille, Prince of Talmond and Taranto
- Mother: Marie de La Tour d'Auvergne

Marie Charlotte de La Trémoille (26 January 1632 – 24 August 1682). was a French noblewoman member of the House of La Trémoille and by marriage Duchess of Saxe-Jena.

Born in Thouars, she was the fifth of six children born from the marriage of Henri III de La Trémoille, 3rd Duke of Thouars, 2nd Duke of La Tremoille, Prince of Talmond and Taranto, and Marie de La Tour d'Auvergne.

== Life ==
In Paris on 10 June 1662 Marie Charlotte (aged 30) married Prince Bernhard (aged 23), fourth surviving son of William, Duke of Saxe-Weimar. The wedding was arranged by Duke William with the purpose to strengthen the relations of the Ernestine branch of the House of Wettin with King Louis XIV. However, the negotiations delayed for almost eight months until a bride was chosen; her family was one of the most prestigious of France, where they bore the rank of princes étrangers.

Marie Charlotte moved with her husband to Jena, who was designed by her late father-in-law as Bernhard's eventual inheritance (although he formally assumed the government over his lands only in 1672). They had five children, of whom only one survived to adulthood:

1. William (Jena, 24 July 1664 – Jena, 21 June 1666).
2. Stillborn daughter (Jena, 7 April 1666).
3. Bernhard (Jena, 9 November 1667 – Jena, 26 April 1668).
4. Charlotte Marie (Jena, 20 December 1669 – Gräfentonna, 6 January 1703), married on 2 November 1683 to Wilhelm Ernst, Duke of Saxe-Weimar; they divorced in 1690.
5. Johann Wilhelm, Duke of Saxe-Jena (Jena, 28 March 1675 – Jena, 4 November 1690).

The union was completely unhappy, and shortly after he obtain the overlordship of Jena, Bernhard wanted divorce Marie Charlotte in order to marry his mistress, Marie Elisabeth of Kospoth, one of the ladies of his court, who on 20 September 1672 bore him a daughter, Emilie Eleonore.

However, the Duke's efforts for a legal separation from his wife proved to be unsuccessful, as no theologian or jurist could give him grounds for divorce; however, Bernhard didn't abandoned his mistress and finally in 1674 they were married by a Jesuit priest named Andreas Wigand. Thus, Bernhard became one of the few cases of bigamy among princes. The wedding was null and void shortly after; resigned, Bernhard decided to reconcile with Marie Charlotte, who one year later gave birth to the long-waited heir.

Marie Charlotte died in Jena aged 50, having survived her husband and three of her children. She was buried in the Stadtkirche, Jena.

Marie Charlotte de La Trémoille House of La Trémoille Born: 26 January 1632 Died: 24 August 1682
German royalty
| New creation | Duchess consort of Saxe-Jena; 1672-1678 | Duchy divided between Saxe-Weimar and Saxe-Eisenach in 1690 |
