= Johann Wilhelm, Duke of Saxe-Jena =

Johann Wilhelm

Duke of Saxe-Jena
- Reign: 1678–1690
- Predecessor: Bernhard II
- Successor: Duchy divided between Saxe-Weimar and Saxe-Eisenach
- Born: 28 March 1675; Jena
- Died: 4 November 1690 (aged 15); Jena
- House: House of Wettin
- Father: Bernhard II, Duke of Saxe-Jena
- Mother: Marie Charlotte de la Trémoille
- Religion: Lutheran

Johann Wilhelm, Duke of Saxe-Jena (28 March 1675 in Jena – 4 November 1690 in Jena), was a duke of Saxe-Jena.

He was the youngest but sole surviving son of Bernhard II, Duke of Saxe-Jena by his wife Marie Charlotte, daughter of Henry de La Trémoille, 3rd Duke of Thouars, 2nd Duke of La Tremoille, and Prince of Talmond and Taranto.

== Life ==
When only three years old (1678) he succeeded his father as Duke of Saxe-Jena. In accordance with the testamentary instructions of his father, his uncle, Duke Johann Ernst II of Saxe-Weimar assumed his guardianship and the regency of the duchy; when he died in 1683, another uncle, Duke Johann Georg I of Saxe-Eisenach, assumed the regency. Three years later (1686), the new regent also died, and his cousin (son of the late Duke Johann Ernst II) and brother-in-law (he was married to his eldest and only surviving sister, Charlotte Marie) Duke Wilhelm Ernst of Saxe-Weimar was appointed to the regency.

As Johann Wilhelm lived only fifteen years and failed to reach adulthood, he never governed. With his death the line of the Dukes of Saxe-Jena had become extinct, and the duchy was divided between Saxe-Weimar and Saxe-Eisenach.

Preceded by Bernhard II	Duke of Saxe-Jena; 1678–1690	Succeeded by Duchy divided between Saxe-Weimar and Saxe-Eisenach
