= Johann Ernst von Sachsen-Weimar =

Johann Ernst von Sachsen-Weimar or Johann Ernst of Saxe-Weimar can refer to:

- Johann Ernst I, Duke of Saxe-Weimar (1594-1626)
- Johann Ernst II, Duke of Saxe-Weimar (1627-1683)
- Johann Ernst III, Duke of Saxe-Weimar (1664-1707)
- Prince Johann Ernst of Saxe-Weimar (1696-1715), sometimes referred to as Johann Ernst IV of Saxe-Weimar; composer and younger son of Johann Ernst III
