= Princess Sophie of Anhalt-Zerbst =

Princess Sophie of Anhalt-Zerbst may refer to:

- Princess Sophie of Anhalt-Zerbst (1729 – 1796) who became Catherine the Great.
- Princess Sophie Auguste of Anhalt-Zerbst (1663 – 1694).
