= Landgravine Charlotte of Hesse-Homburg =

Charlotte of Hesse-Homburg
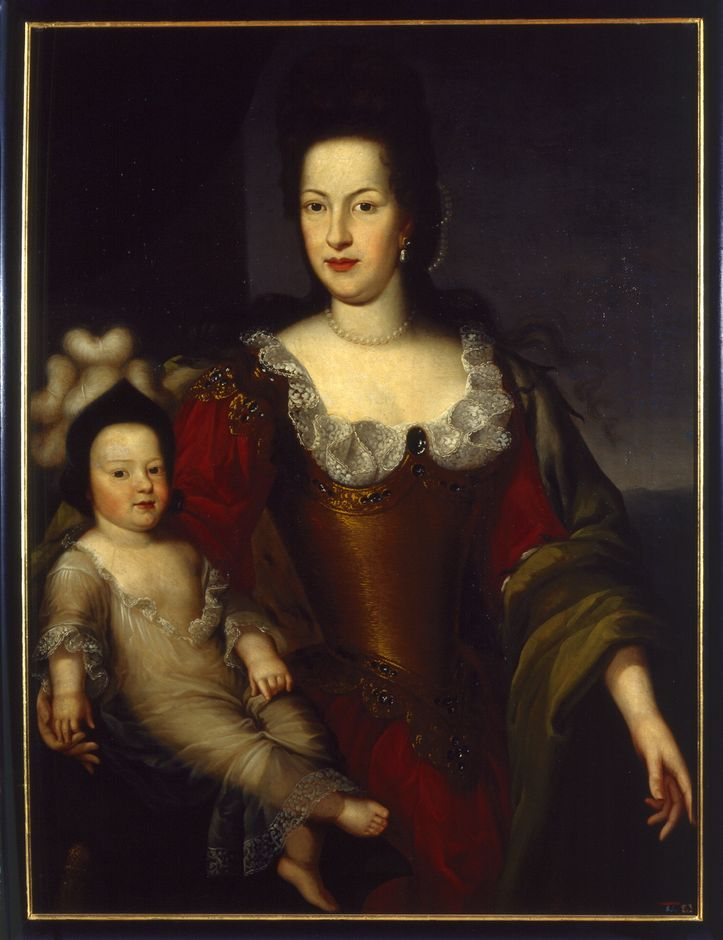
- Portrait of Charlotte with her son Johann Ernst, 1697

Duchess consort of Saxe-Weimar
- Tenure: 1694–1707
- Born: 17 June 1672; Kassel
- Died: 29 August 1738 (aged 66); Weimar
- Spouse: Johann Ernst III, Duke of Saxe-Weimar (m. 1694; died 1707)
- Issue: Prince Karl Frederick; Prince Johann Ernst; Princess Marie Luise; Princess Christiane Sophie
Names
- Charlotte Dorothea Sophia
- House: House of Hesse
- Father: Frederick II, Landgrave of Hesse-Homburg
- Mother: Louise Elisabeth of Courland

Charlotte of Hesse-Homburg (Charlotte Dorothea Sophia; 17 June 1672 – 29 August 1738) was a Duchess of Saxe-Weimar by her marriage to Johann Ernst III, Duke of Saxe-Weimar.

== Life ==
Born in Kassel, she was the eldest of the twelve children born from the second marriage of Frederick II, Landgrave of Hesse-Homburg to Louise Elisabeth Kettler, Princess of Courland and Semigallia.

In Kassel on 4 November 1694, Charlotte married Johann Ernst III, Duke of Saxe-Weimar, becoming his second wife just under two months after his first wife Sophie Auguste's death.

After her husband's death in 1707, she received as a wittum (dower land) the town of Hardisleben. Her main residence was the Yellow Castle (German: Gelbe Schloss) in Weimar, which was built from 1702 to 1704.

The guardianship of her only surviving child, Johann Ernest, was given to her brother-in-law William Ernest; however, Charlotte devotedly took care of her son during his illness and death at the age of just 18 in 1715.

Charlotte died in Weimar, aged 66 and was buried in the Fürstengruft.

== Issue ==
She had four children who all died young:

1. Charles Frederick (Weimar, 31 October 1695 – Weimar, 30 March 1696), died in infancy.
2. Johann Ernest (Weimar, 25 December 1696 – Frankfurt, 1 August 1715), died in adolescence.
3. Marie Louise (Weimar, 18 December 1697 – Weimar, 29 December 1704), died in early childhood.
4. Christiane Sophie (Weimar, 7 April 1700 – Weimar, 18 February 1701), died in infancy.

== Notes ==
Landgravine Charlotte of Hesse-Homburg House of Hesse Born: 17 June 1672 Died: 29 August 1738
German royalty
Vacant Title last held by Princess Sophie Auguste of Anhalt-Zerbst	Duchess consort of Saxe-Weimar; 1694-1707	Vacant Title next held by Eleonore Wilhelmine of Anhalt-Köthen
