= Anthony Günther =

Anthony Günther may refer to:

- Anthony Günther, Count of Oldenburg (1583–1667), Imperial Count and member of the House of Oldenburg
- Anthony Günther, Prince of Anhalt-Zerbst (1653–1714), German prince of the House of Ascania
