= Princess Sophie Auguste of Anhalt-Zerbst =

Sophie Auguste of Anhalt-Zerbst
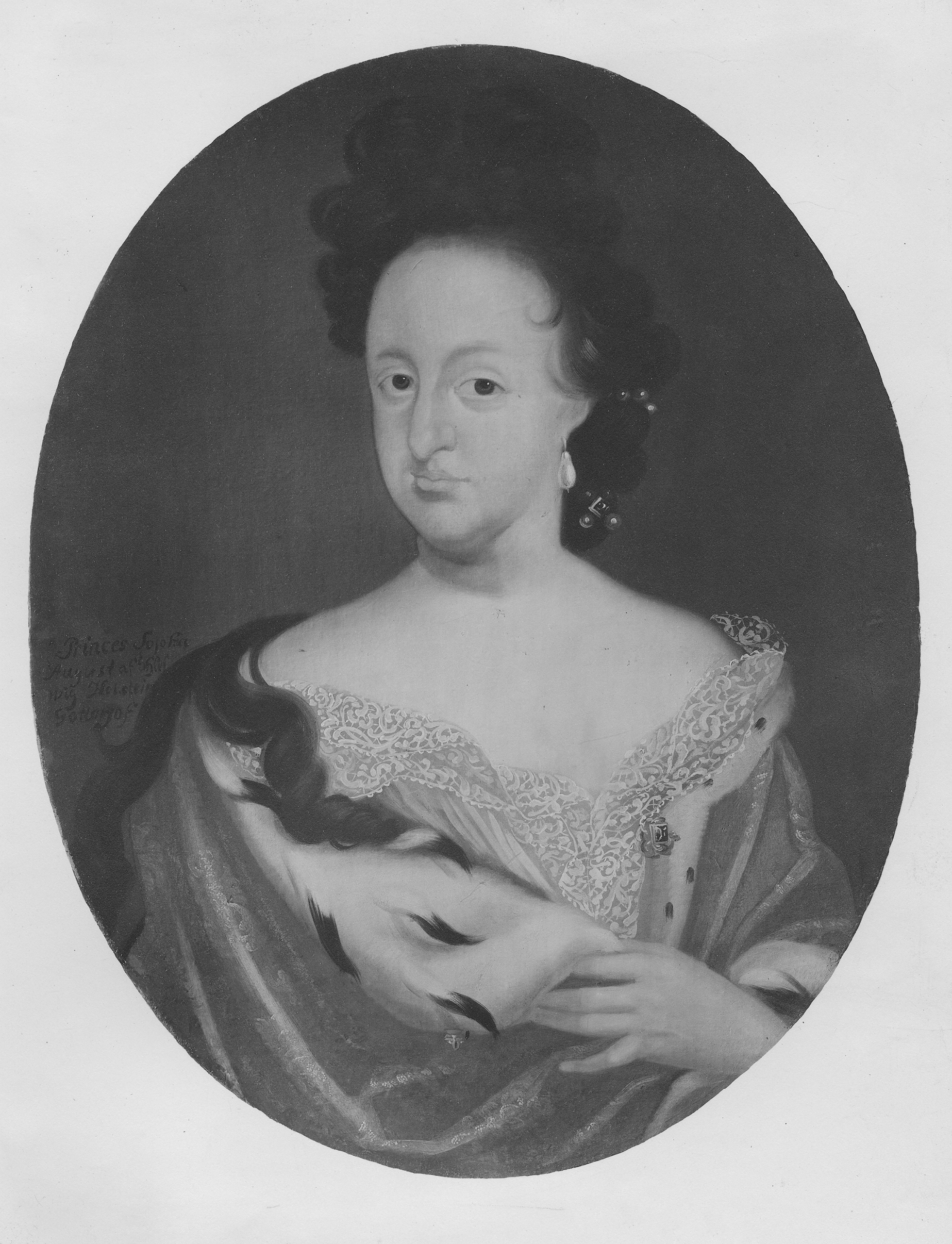
- 17th century portrait

Duchess consort of Saxe-Weimar
- Tenure: 1685–1694
- Born: 9 March 1663; Zerbst
- Died: 14 September 1694 (aged 31); Weimar
- Spouse: Johann Ernst III, Duke of Saxe-Weimar
- Issue: Prince Johann Wilhelm, Hereditary Duke of Saxe-Weimar; Ernst August I Princess Eleonore Christiane; Princess Johanna Auguste; Princess Johanna Charlotte
- House: House of Ascania
- Father: John VI, Prince of Anhalt-Zerbst
- Mother: Sophie Augusta of Holstein-Gottorp

Sophie Auguste of Anhalt-Zerbst (9 March 1663 – 14 September 1694) was a German noblewoman, a member of the House of Ascania by birth and by marriage a Duchess of Saxe-Weimar.

Born in Zerbst, she was the eleventh of fourteen children born from the marriage of John VI, Prince of Anhalt-Zerbst and Sophie Augusta of Holstein-Gottorp and the only surviving daughter. Of her thirteen older and younger siblings, only four brothers lived to adulthood: Karl William, Anthony Günther, John Adolph and John Louis.

== Life ==
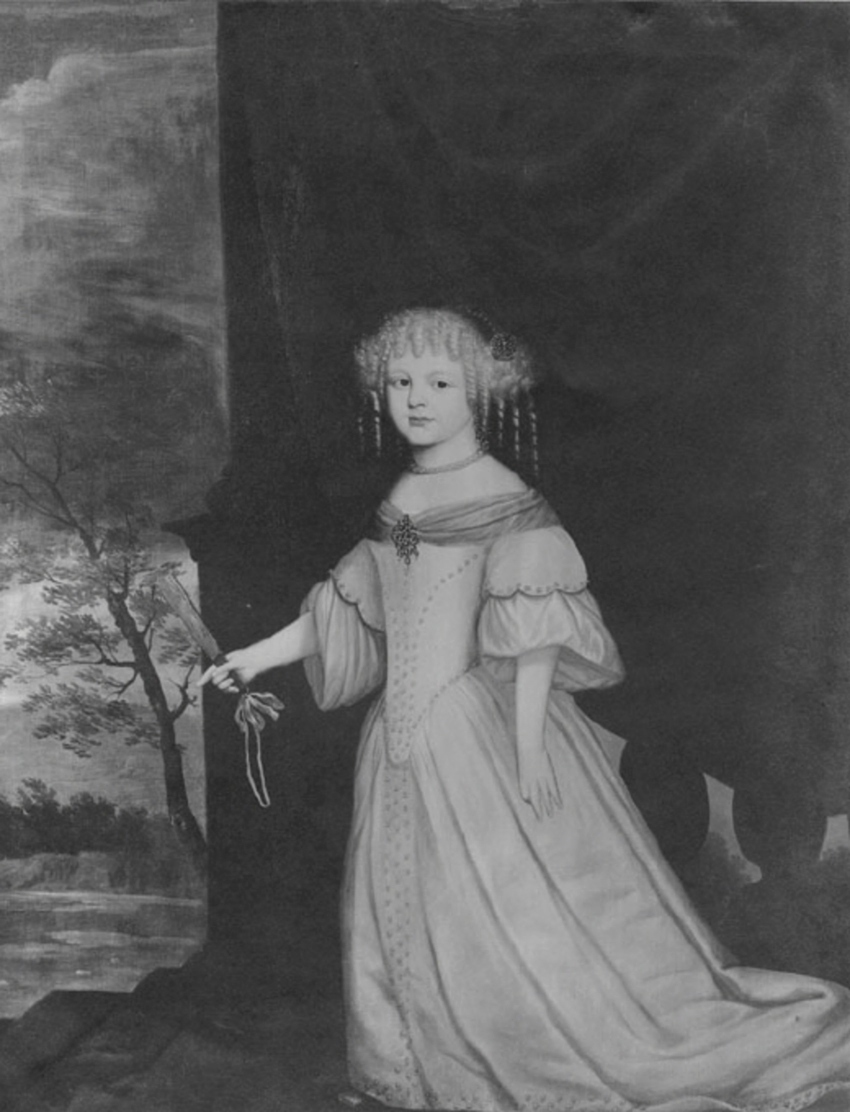
Portrait of Sophie Auguste as a young girl, circa 1670

In Zerbst on 11 October 1685, Sophie Auguste married Johann Ernst III, Duke of Saxe-Weimar. They had five children, of whom only two survived to adulthood:

1. John William, Hereditary Prince of Saxe-Weimar (Weimar, 4 June 1686 - Weimar, 14 October 1686), died in infancy.
2. Ernest Augustus I, Duke of Saxe-Weimar (Weimar, 19 April 1688 – Eisenach, 19 January 1748), later inherited Eisenach and Jena.
3. Eleonore Christiane (Weimar, 15 April 1689 – Weimar, 7 February 1690), died in infancy.
4. Johanna Auguste (Weimar, 6 July 1690 – Weimar, 24 August 1691), died in early childhood.
5. Johanna Charlotte (Weimar, 23 November 1693 – Weimar, 2 March 1751).

Sophie Auguste died in Weimar, aged only 31, and was buried in the Fürstengruft. On 4 November 1694, just under two months after Sophie Auguste's death, her widower remarried to Landgravine Charlotte of Hesse-Homburg, with whom he went on to have four more children who all died young.

Princess Sophie Auguste of Anhalt-Zerbst House of Wettin Born: 9 March 1663 Died: 14 September 1694
German royalty
Preceded by Charlotte Marie of Saxe-Jena	Duchess consort of Saxe-Weimar; 1685-1694 jointly with Charlotte Marie of Saxe-Jena until 1690	Vacant Title next held by Charlotte of Hesse-Homburg
