= Marie de La Tour d'Auvergne =

17th-century French noblewoman

- Duchess of Thouars; Duchess of La Tremoille; Princess of Talmond and Taranto
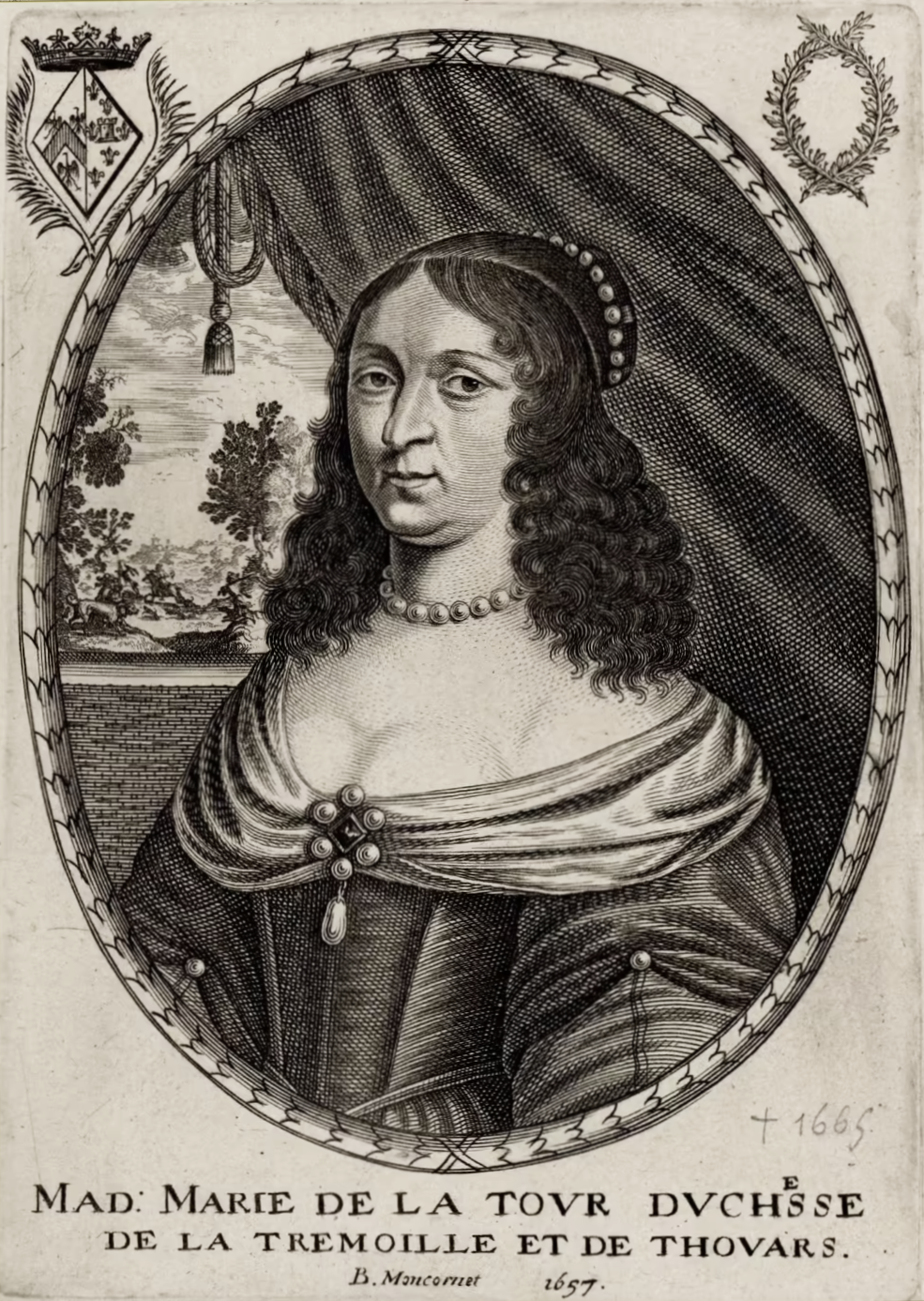
- Born: 17 January 1601; Turenne, Guyenne; Kingdom of France
- Died: 24 May 1665 (aged 64); Thouars
- Noble family: La Tour d'Auvergne
- Spouse: Henri de La Trémoille
- Issue: Henri Charles de La Trémoille; Marie Charlotte de La Trémoille
- Father: Henri de La Tour d'Auvergne, Duke of Bouillon
- Mother: Countess Elisabeth of Nassau

Marie de La Tour d'Auvergne (17 January 1601 – 24 May 1665) was a French noblewoman. As the wife of Henri de La Trémoille, she was Duchess of Thouars, Duchess of La Tremoille, and Princess of Talmond and Taranto.

== Biography ==
Marie de La Tour d'Auvergne was born on 17 January 1601 in Turenne to Henri de La Tour d'Auvergne, Duke of Bouillon and Countess Elisabeth of Nassau. D'Auvergne was a sister of Frédéric Maurice de La Tour d'Auvergne and Henri de La Tour d'Auvergne, Viscount of Turenne. She was raised by her mother in Sedan and received a strict Calvinist education. As a child, she was betrothed to Henri de La Trémoille. Their marriage contract was signed on 19 January 1619 and they married on 18 February later that year. They had six children including Henri Charles de La Trémoille and Marie Charlotte de La Trémoille.

While her husband converted to Catholicism in 1628, she remained faithful to the Reformed Church. She persuaded her husband to continue to protect Huguenots in his duchy, and hosted the national synod in Loudun in 1659.

She died on 24 May 1665 in Thouars. She is buried at the Church of Notre-Dame de Thouars.
