= Sophie Augusta of Holstein-Gottorp =

- Princess of Anhalt-Zerbst
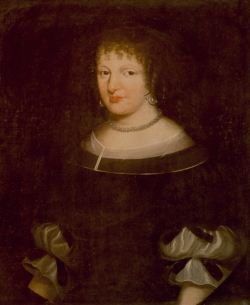
- 17th-century portrait
- Born: 5 December 1630; Gottorp
- Died: 12 December 1680 (aged 50); Coswig
- Spouse: John VI, Prince of Anhalt-Zerbst
- Issue Detail: Karl William, Prince of Anhalt-Zerbst; Anthony Günther, Prince of Anhalt-Mühlingen; John Louis I, Prince of Anhalt-Zerbst-Dornburg; Sophie Auguste
- House: House of Holstein-Gottorp
- Father: Frederick III, Duke of Holstein-Gottorp
- Mother: Duchess Marie Elisabeth of Saxony

Sophie Augusta of Holstein-Gottorp (5 December 1630 in Gottorp – 12 December 1680 in Coswig) was a regent of Anhalt-Zerbst during the minority of her eldest surviving son from 1667 until 1674.

== Life ==
She was a daughter of Frederick III, Duke of Holstein-Gottorp and Duchess Marie Elisabeth of Saxony.

On 16 September 1649 in Gottorp, she married John VI, Prince of Anhalt-Zerbst. Sophie Augusta was constantly pregnant during her marriage, giving birth almost once a year, but most of her children went on to die in infancy.

After her husband died in 1667, she served as regent for her minor son Charles William until he came of age in 1674.

== Issue ==
Only five of her fourteen children survived into adulthood:

1. John Frederick, Hereditary Prince of Anhalt-Zerbst (b. Zerbst, 11 October 1650 – d. Zerbst, 13 March 1651), died in infancy.
2. George Rudolph, Hereditary Prince of Anhalt-Zerbst (b. Zerbst, 8 September 1651 – d. Zerbst, 26 February 1652), died in infancy.
3. Karl William, Prince of Anhalt-Zerbst (b. Zerbst, 16 October 1652 – d. Zerbst, 8 November 1718).
4. Anthony Günther, Prince of Anhalt-Mühlingen (b. Zerbst, 11 January 1653 – d. Zerbst, 10 December 1714).
5. John Adolph (b. Zerbst, 2 December 1654 – d. Zerbst, 19 March 1726).
6. John Louis I, Prince of Anhalt-Zerbst-Dornburg (b. Zerbst, 4 May 1656 – d. Dornburg, 1 November 1704).
7. Joachim Ernest (b. Zerbst, 30 July 1657 – d. Zerbst, 4 June 1658), died in infancy.
8. Magdalene Sophie (b. Zerbst, 31 October 1658 – d. Zerbst, 30 March 1659), died in infancy.
9. Frederick (b. Zerbst, 11 July 1660 – d. Zerbst, 24 November 1660), died in infancy.
10. Hedwig Marie Eleonore (b. Zerbst, 30 January 1662 – d. Zerbst, 30 June 1662), died in infancy.
11. Sophie Auguste (b. Zerbst, 9 March 1663 – d. Weimar, 14 September 1694), married on 11 October 1685 to Johann Ernst III, Duke of Saxe-Weimar.
12. A daughter (b. and d. Zerbst, 12 February 1664).
13. Albert (b. and d. Zerbst, 12 February 1665).
14. Augustus (b. Zerbst, 23 August 1666 – d. Zerbst, 7 April 1667), died in infancy.
