= John VI of Anhalt-Zerbst =

German prince

John VI, Prince of Anhalt-Zerbst
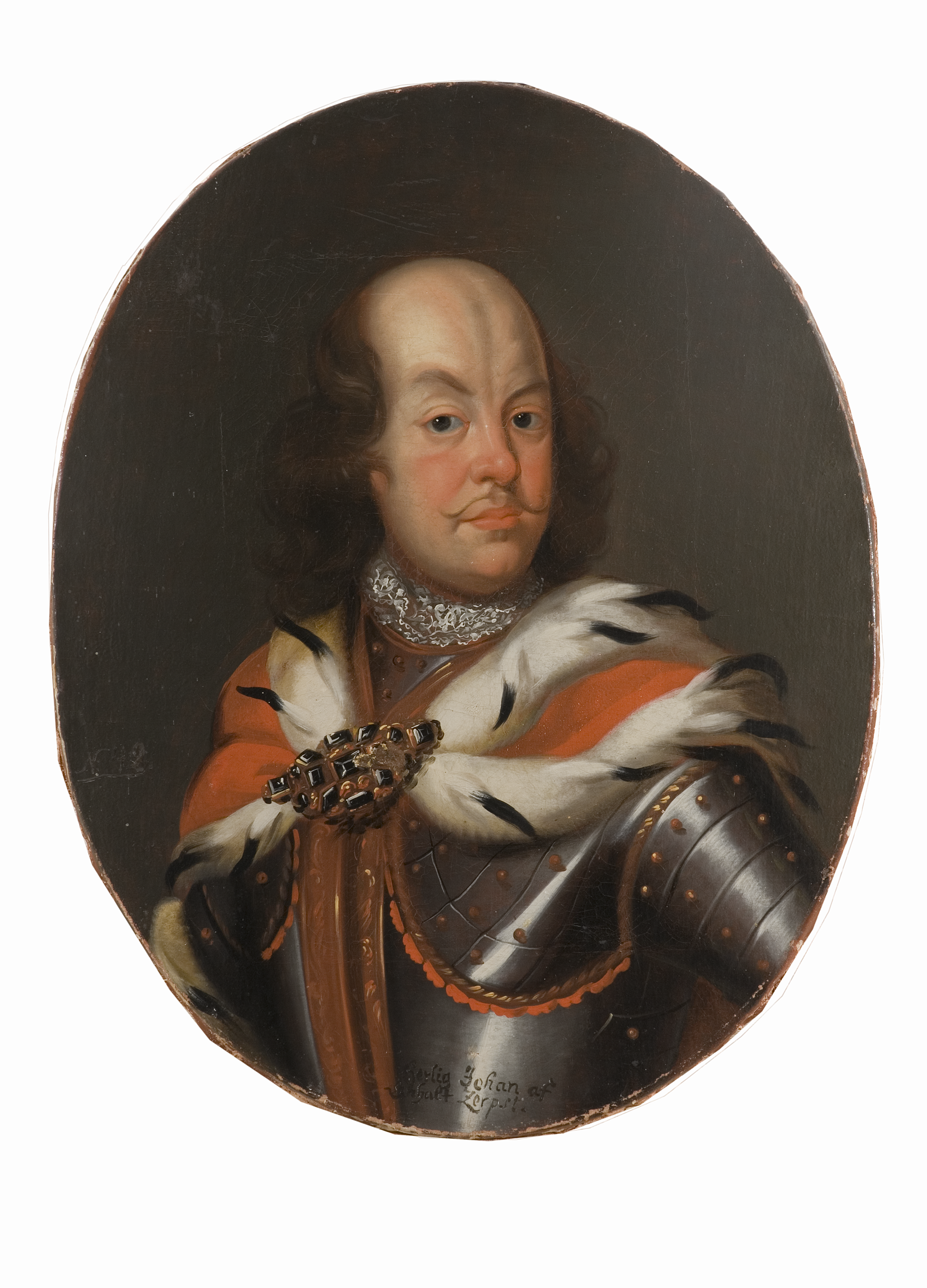
- Born: 24 March 1621; Zerbst, Principality of Anhalt-Zerbst
- Died: 4 July 1667 (aged 46); Zerbst
- Spouse: Sophie Augusta of Holstein-Gottorp
- Issue Detail: Karl William, Prince of Anhalt-Zerbst; Anthony Günther, Prince of Anhalt-Mühlingen; John Louis I, Prince of Anhalt-Zerbst-Dornburg; Sophie Auguste
- House: House of Ascania
- Father: Rudolph, Prince of Anhalt-Zerbst
- Mother: Magdalene of Oldenburg

John VI of Anhalt-Zerbst (Zerbst, 24 March 1621 – Zerbst, 4 July 1667), was a German prince of the House of Ascania and ruler of the Principality of Anhalt-Zerbst.

He was the only son of Rudolph, Prince of Anhalt-Zerbst, by his second wife Magdalene, daughter of John VII, Count of Oldenburg.

== Life ==
John succeeded his father in Anhalt-Zerbst at only four months of age; during his long minority, his paternal uncle Augustus of Anhalt-Plötzkau acted as regent in the principality.

John's education was supervised primarily by his mother. Political instability caused by warfare during the Thirty Years War caused John to be educated in Zerbst, Coswig, and Wittenberg at various times. From 1633 he continued his education at the court of his maternal uncle Anthony Günther, Count of Oldenburg.

Immediately after he reached adulthood and formally assumed the government of his state, John made Lutheranism the official religion of Zerbst. He increased the size of his principality noticeably by acquiring various fiefs.

In 1642 his uncle Louis of Anhalt-Köthen, admitted John to the Fruitbearing Society together with the Hofrat Konrad Balthasar Pichtel and the Hofjunker Joachim von Boeselager. He chose the motto anmutiger Schärfe ("graceful sharpness"). As an emblem the flower Tropaeolaceae was reserved for him.

In 1667 John, for the last weeks of his life, inherited from his maternal uncle the Jever dominion on the coast of North Sea. His uncle, Anthony Gunther, Count of Oldenburg, left merely an illegitimate son and no other progeny of his own, to whom the Count was able to convey and testament merely some freely disposable properties of his, such as Varel and Kniphausen. The count's family heritage lands and fiefs needed to be inherited through legitimate lines. The late Count had made approximately this kind of stipulations in his testament – which said that the nephew John will inherit Jever, a Frisian lordship. Jever was an allodial-type inheritance, capable to be inherited also by females. Therefore, John would have inherited Jever also on basis of his late mother's rights. No serious conflict arose against John inheriting it.

== Marriage and issue ==
In Gottorp on 16 September 1649 John married Sophie Auguste, daughter of Frederick III, Duke of Schleswig-Holstein-Gottorp. They had fourteen children:

1. John Frederick, Hereditary Prince of Anhalt-Zerbst (b. Zerbst, 11 October 1650 – d. Zerbst, 13 March 1651).
2. George Rudolph, Hereditary Prince of Anhalt-Zerbst (b. Zerbst, 8 September 1651 – d. Zerbst, 26 February 1652).
3. Karl William, Prince of Anhalt-Zerbst (b. Zerbst, 16 October 1652 – d. Zerbst, 8 November 1718).
4. Anthony Günther, Prince of Anhalt-Mühlingen (b. Zerbst, 11 January 1653 – d. Zerbst, 10 December 1714).
5. John Adolph (b. Zerbst, 2 December 1654 – d. Zerbst, 19 March 1726).
6. John Louis I, Prince of Anhalt-Zerbst-Dornburg (b. Zerbst, 4 May 1656 – d. Dornburg, 1 November 1704).
7. Joachim Ernest (b. Zerbst, 30 July 1657 – d. Zerbst, 4 June 1658).
8. Magdalene Sophie (b. Zerbst, 31 October 1658 – d. Zerbst, 30 March 1659).
9. Frederick (b. Zerbst, 11 July 1660 – d. Zerbst, 24 November 1660).
10. Hedwig Marie Eleonore (b. Zerbst, 30 January 1662 – d. Zerbst, 30 June 1662).
11. Sophie Auguste (b. Zerbst, 9 March 1663 – d. Weimar, 14 September 1694), married on 11 October 1685 to Johann Ernst III, Duke of Saxe-Weimar.
12. A daughter (b. and d. Zerbst, 12 February 1664).
13. Albert (b. and d. Zerbst, 12 February 1665).
14. Augustus (b. Zerbst, 23 August 1666 – d. Zerbst, 7 April 1667).

John VI of Anhalt-Zerbst House of Ascania Born: 24 March 1621 Died: 4 July 1667
Preceded by Rudolph	Prince of Anhalt-Zerbst; 1621–1667	Succeeded by Karl William
