= Bernhard II of Saxe-Jena =

Bernhard II
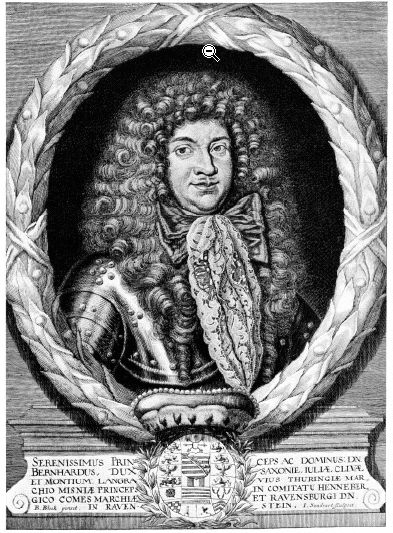

Duke of Saxe-Jena
- Reign: 1662–1678
- Predecessor: New Creation
- Successor: Johann Wilhelm
- Born: 14 October 1638; Weimar
- Died: 3 May 1678 (aged 39); Jena
- Spouse: Marie Charlotte de la Trémoille
- Issue: Charlotte Marie, Duchess of Saxe-Weimar; Johann Wilhelm, Duke of Saxe-Jena
- House: House of Wettin
- Father: Wilhelm, Duke of Saxe-Weimar
- Mother: Eleonore Dorothea of Anhalt-Dessau
- Religion: Lutheran

Bernhard II, Duke of Saxe-Jena (Weimar, 14 October 1638 – Jena, 3 May 1678), was duke of Saxe-Jena.

He was the seventh child but fourth surviving son of Wilhelm, Duke of Saxe-Weimar and Eleonore Dorothea of Anhalt-Dessau.

Bernhard attended the University of Jena from February 1654 until November 1657. Subsequently, he was pulled into political affairs when his father sent him to Paris in order to strengthen the relations of Ernestine line with the King Louis XIV, hopefully through a marriage. The French king, however, made him wait eighteen months for an audience. The stay in France finally led to his marriage to Marie Charlotte de la Trémoille, daughter of Henri de La Trémoille and Marie de La Tour d'Auvergne. Her family were residents of the French court where they bore the rank of princes étrangers. The wedding took place in Paris on 10 June 1662. Shortly after, the couple moved to Jena, where their five children were born:

1. Wilhelm (b. Jena, 24 July 1664 – d. Jena, 21 June 1666).
2. Stillborn daughter (Jena, 7 April 1666).
3. Bernhard (b. Jena, 9 November 1667 – d. Jena, 26 April 1668).
4. Charlotte Marie (b. Jena, 20 December 1669 – d. Gräfentonna, 6 January 1703), married on 2 November 1683 to Wilhelm Ernst, Duke of Saxe-Weimar; they divorced in 1690.
5. Johann Wilhelm, Duke of Saxe-Jena (b. Jena, 28 March 1675 – d. Jena, 4 November 1690).

In 1662 Bernhard and his brothers divided the paternal inheritance, and he received Jena.

The marriage of Bernhard and Marie Charlotte was totally unhappy, and, as they were seemingly irreconcilable, the duke had decided to marry one of the ladies of his court, Marie Elisabeth of Kospoth. He solemnly promised that he would divorce his wife and marry her, and she ceded to his advances. They had one daughter:

1. Emilie Eleonore of Kospoth (b. Schloss Dornburg, 20 September 1672 – d. Merseburg, 3 May 1709), Countess of Altstädt since 1676; married in 1692 to Otto Wilhelm of Tümpling.

Meanwhile, Bernhard's efforts to have his marriage annulled were unsuccessful, as no theologian or jurist could give him grounds for divorce; and he appeared to reconcile himself with Marie Charlotte.

Nevertheless, on 20 October 1672 he promised in writing to his mistress that he would never forget her, but would care and protect her as if she were his true wife, and giving her the style of "Lady of Alstädt" and an annual rent of 1000 Taler. Then, in 1674, they were married by a former Jesuit priest named Andreas Wigand, converted to Lutheranism in 1671. Thus, Bernhard became one of the few cases of bigamy among princes. The contract declared the children to be legitimate and noble, until such time as an Imperial Act could bring them to a higher rank. She was given as Morgengabe a sum of 20,000 Taler and assigned the Schloss Dornburg as her residence. She was obliged to keep the marriage secret until the death of the duke's first wife; should she reveal it, the duke would cease to be bound by the contract.

On 8 November 1676 Marie Elisabeth was raised by the Emperor to the rank of an Imperial Countess (Reichgräfin), along with her daughter, and any other legitimate children of hers, with the title of Countess of Altstädt (Gräfin von Altstädt) and the style of "hoch- und wohlgebohrne".

When Bernhard died, at the age of 39, was succeeded by his only surviving son Johann Wilhelm, born of his first wife after their reconciliation in 1675.

Marie Elisabeth obtained her Morgengabe, not without some difficulty. She survived her "husband" thirty-eight years.

Preceded by New Creation	Duke of Saxe-Jena; 1662–1678	Succeeded by Johann Wilhelm
