= Princess Christine Elisabeth of Schleswig-Holstein-Sonderburg =

Princess Christine Elisabeth

Duchess consort of Saxe-Weimar
- Tenure: 1662–1679
- Born: 23 June 1638; Sonderburg
- Died: 7 June 1679 (aged 40); Weimar
- Spouse: John Ernest II, Duke of Saxe-Weimar
- Issue: Anna Dorothea, Abbess of Quedlinburg; Wilhelmine Christine, Countess of Schwarzburg-Sondershausen; Eleonore Sophie, Duchess of Saxe-Merseburg-Lauchstädt; William Ernest, Duke of Saxe-Weimar; John Ernest III, Duke of Saxe-Weimar
- House: Oldenburg
- Father: John Christian, Duke of Schleswig-Holstein-Sonderburg
- Mother: Anna of Oldenburg-Delmenhorst

Princess Christine Elisabeth of Schleswig-Holstein-Sonderburg (23 June 1638 – 7 June 1679), was a German noblewoman member of the House of Oldenburg and by marriage Duchess of Saxe-Weimar.

Born in Sonderburg, she was the second of the four children born from the marriage of John Christian, Duke of Schleswig-Holstein-Sonderburg, and Countess Anna of Oldenburg-Delmenhorst. From her three older and younger siblings, two survive adulthood: Dorothea Auguste (by marriage Landgravine of Hesse-Darmstadt) and Christian Adolph, Duke of Schleswig-Holstein-Sonderburg.

== Life ==
On 14 August 1656, Christine Elisabeth married John Ernest, Hereditary Prince of Saxe-Weimar. They had five children:

1. Anna Dorothea (Weimar, 12 November 1657 – Quedlinburg, 23 June 1704), Abbess of Quedlinburg (1685).
2. Wilhelmine Christine (Weimar, 26 January 1658 – Sondershausen, 30 June 1712), married on 25 September 1684 to Christian William I, Count of Schwarzburg-Sondershausen.
3. Eleonore Sophie (Weimar, 22 March 1660 – Lauchstädt, 4 February 1687), married on 9 July 1684 to Philipp, Duke of Saxe-Merseburg-Lauchstädt.
4. William Ernest, Duke of Saxe-Weimar (Weimar, 19 October 1662 – Weimar, 26 August 1728).
5. John Ernest III, Duke of Saxe-Weimar (Weimar, 22 June 1664 – Weimar, 10 May 1707).

After the death of her father-in-law in 1662, she became Duchess of Saxe-Weimar.

She died in Weimar aged 40. She was buried in the Fürstengruft, Weimar.

Princess Christine Elisabeth of Schleswig-Holstein-Sonderburg House of Oldenburg Born: 23 June 1638 Died: 7 June 1679
German royalty
Preceded by Eleonore Dorothea of Anhalt-Dessau	Duchess consort of Saxe-Weimar; 1662–1679	Vacant Title next held by Charlotte Marie of Saxe-Jena
