= Anthony Günther, Prince of Anhalt-Zerbst =

German prince

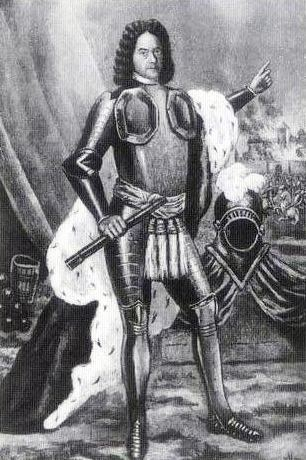
Anthony Günther, Prince of Anhalt-Zerbst

Anthony Günther, Prince of Anhalt-Zerbst (11 November 1653 – 10 December 1714) was a German prince of the House of Ascania.

He was born in Zerbst, the fourth (but second surviving) son of John VI, Prince of Anhalt-Zerbst, by his wife Sophie Auguste, daughter of Frederick III, Duke of Schleswig-Holstein-Gottorp.

== Life ==
After the death of his father in 1667, Anthony Günther received the castle of Mühlingen. During his minority, his mother the Dowager Princess Sophie Auguste acted as regent.

In 1669 he and his older brother Karl William started their Grand Tour and visited Holland, England, France, and Italy; they only returned to Zerbst in 1672. Soon afterwards he began his military career and fought in Italy against France under the command of Johann Karl, Palatine Count of Birkenfeld, and was present at the sieges of Oudenaarde, Grave (1674) and Philippsburg (1676). After the Treaty of Nijmegen he stayed in Italy until 1681, when he returned to Zerbst. One year later he travelled again, this time to Denmark, Sweden, Courland, and Poland. Under the command of the Elector John George III of Saxony, he fought in the Battle of Vienna (1683).

In 1689 the war against King Louis XIV of France was renewed; he moved with the Brandenburg troops outside Bonn, where he distinguished himself in battle; for this, the Elector Frederick III (later King Frederick I of Prussia) called him Obersten ("The Highest"). Anthony Günther marched in 1690 with the Brandenburg troops to Brabant and became Commandant of Ath. In 1692 he fought in the Battle of Steenkerque, where he received five shots in his left arm. Hardly recovered from his wounds, he got another shot in Landau, once again in the arm. Now in charge of a battalion, King William III of England in 1694 appointed him Commander-in-Chief of a brigade of 9 battalions and in 1695 handed him over the governorship of Ath, whose fortress he had surrendered, however, after a brave defense, to Nicolas Catinat.

In 1698 he was appointed Major-General by the Elector of Brandenburg, and at the same time received command of about 5000 Brandenburg Hülfstruppen who had acted in the service of the Dutch Republic. In this position he was present at the siege of Bonn and was wounded by a mat ball in the chest. After the taking of Bonn he went to Brabant and took Huy. Nonetheless, his health was severely weakened by so many wounds and shortly after resigned his command.

After a visit to the Aachen baths, he returned from Berlin to Zerbst. In 1705 King Frederick I appointed him General-Lieutenant.

== Marriage and issue ==
Around 1680, Anthony Günther began an affair with the delicate and beautiful Auguste Antonie Marschall of Bieberstein (b. Zerbst, 3 March 1659 – d. Calbe, 28 December 1736), a lady-in-waiting of his mother. She lived under the name of "Madame Güntherode" in Naumburg, where the prince regularly visited her in the short intervals between his long trips. The union only produced a daughter:

1. Antoinette ["von Günthersfeld" from 1705] (b. Naumburg, 27 October 1681 – d. Calbe, 16 November 1754), married first to Ernest Sigismund of Mergenthal (d. 1708), secondly on 24 September 1714 to Burchard Vollrath of Erlach (d. 1716), and thirdly on 24 May 1720 to Christian Albrecht of Platen (d. aft. 1754).

After his definitive return home, Anthony Günther formally married his beloved Auguste in Zerbst on 1 January 1705; shortly after, she was created "Frau von Günthersfeld." Because Auguste was born into the lesser nobility, the marriage was morganatic and their daughter Antoinette, legitimized by the wedding, could only assume the surname "von Günthersfeld," her mother's new title.

The couple lived quietly at times in Zerbst and at times in Schloss Mühlingen. Dedicating himself during his last years to religion, Anthony Günther died in Zerbst without male issue, and his principality was merged again into Anhalt-Zerbst.
