= William Ernest, Duke of Saxe-Weimar =

William Ernest
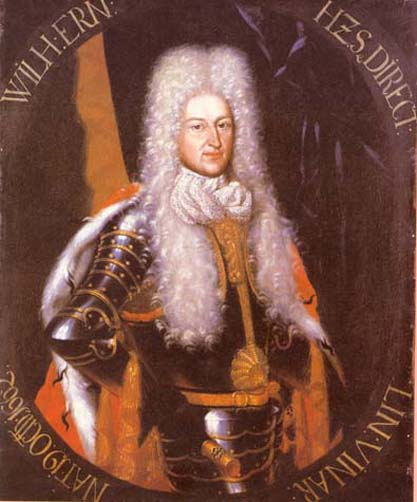
- Portrait by unknown, turn of the 17/18th century

Duke of Saxe-Weimar
- Reign: 1683–1728
- Predecessor: Johann Ernst II
- Successor: Ernst August I
- Born: 19 October 1662; Weimar
- Died: 26 August 1728 (aged 65); Weimar
- Spouse: Charlotte Marie of Saxe-Jena
- House: Wettin (Ernestine line)
- Father: Johann Ernst II, Duke of Saxe-Weimar
- Mother: Princess Christine Elisabeth of Schleswig-Holstein-Sonderburg
- Religion: Lutheran

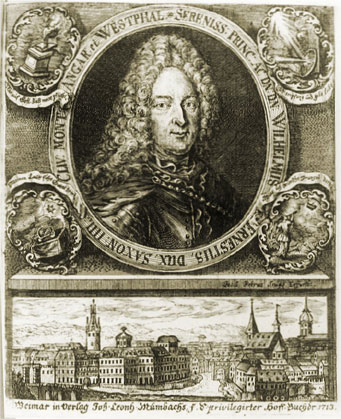
William Ernest, Duke of Saxe-Weimar

William Ernest, Duke of Saxe-Weimar (19 October 1662 – 26 August 1728) was a duke of Saxe-Weimar.

== Life ==
He was born in Weimar, the eldest son of Johann Ernst II, Duke of Saxe-Weimar and Princess Christine Elisabeth of Schleswig-Holstein-Sonderburg.

When his father died in 1683, he succeeded him as duke; however, he was compelled to rule jointly with his younger brother Johann Ernst III.

Because John Ernest III was an alcoholic, William Ernest took full control of the government of the duchy and permitted John Ernest the nominal title of co-duke (Mitherr) until his death in 1707. After the death of his brother he made John Ernest's son, Ernest August I, co-duke, but with no real power.

In Eisenach on 2 November 1683, William Ernest married his cousin, Charlotte Marie, eldest surviving daughter of his uncle Bernhard II, Duke of Saxe-Jena, in order to secure the family lands. At that time, the guardian of Charlotte and her younger brother, Duke Johann William of Saxe-Jena, was their only surviving uncle, Duke John George I of Saxe-Eisenach. When John George died in 1686, Wilhelm Ernst became his cousin (and brother-in-law)'s guardian.

William Ernest was a strict Lutheran and commanded that only men who could read and comment on Lutheran theological writings be admitted to his armed forces. The composer Johann Sebastian Bach worked for the duke from 1708, first as organist, then as Konzertmeister (leader of the orchestra) in Weimar. When Johann Samuel Drese died in 1716, Bach solicited his post of Kapellmeister (head of the court musical establishment), but William Ernest appointed Drese's incompetent son for the post instead; furious, Bach solicited his dismissal from the Duke's service. Annoyed at Bach's impertinence, William Ernest had Bach jailed for four weeks in a fortress before he accepted his dismissal.

On 23 August 1690, William Ernest and Charlotte Marie were divorced after seven years of childless and extremely unhappy union. Two months later, on 4 November, duke John William of Saxe-Jena (Charlotte Marie's brother), died without heirs, and Wilhelm Ernst took possession of part of his duchy after a treaty was signed with the Saxe-Eisenach branch of his family.

William Ernest never remarried and died at Weimar without heirs; his nephew Ernest August I became his successor.

== Ancestry ==
Ancestors of William Ernest, Duke of Saxe-Weimar

8. John II, Duke of Saxe-Weimar
4. William, Duke of Saxe-Weimar
9. Dorothea Maria of Anhalt
2. John Ernest II, Duke of Saxe-Weimar
10. John George I, Prince of Anhalt-Dessau
5. Eleonore Dorothea of Anhalt-Dessau
11. Countess Palatine Dorothea of Simmern
1. William Ernest, Duke of Saxe-Weimar
12. Alexander, Duke of Schleswig-Holstein-Sonderburg
6. John Christian, Duke of Schleswig-Holstein-Sonderburg
13. Dorothea of Schwarzburg-Sondershausen
3. Princess Christine Elisabeth of Schleswig-Holstein-Sonderburg
14. Anthony II, Count of Oldenburg-Delmenhorst
7. Anna of Oldenburg-Delmenhorst
15. Sibylle Elisabeth of Brunswick-Dannenberg

William Ernest, Duke of Saxe-Weimar House of Wettin Born: 19 October 1662 Died: 26 August 1728
Regnal titles
Preceded by John Ernest II	Duke of Saxe-Weimar with Johann Ernst III; 1683–1728	Succeeded by Ernest August I
