= Saxe-Jena =

One of the Saxon Duchies of the Wettin Dynasty

Duchy of Saxe-Jena Herzogtum Sachsen-Jena (German)
- 1672–1690
- Saxe-Jena, shown with the other Ernestine duchies
- Status: State of the Holy Roman Empire
- Capital: Jena
- Government: Principality
- Historical era: Middle Ages
  - Partitioned from Saxe-Weimar: 1672
  - Ducal line extinct; restored to Saxe-Weimar: 1690
Preceded by	Succeeded by
Saxe-Weimar	Saxe-Weimar

The Duchy of Saxe-Jena was one of the Saxon Duchies held by the Ernestine line of the Wettin Dynasty. Established in 1672 for Bernhard, fourth son of Wilhelm, Duke of Saxe-Weimar, Saxe-Jena was reincorporated into Saxe-Weimar on the extinction of Bernhard's line in 1690.

== Dukes of Saxe-Jena ==
- Bernhard II (1672–1678)
- Johann Wilhelm (1678–1690)

Reincorporated into Saxe-Weimar.
