= John Ernest III =

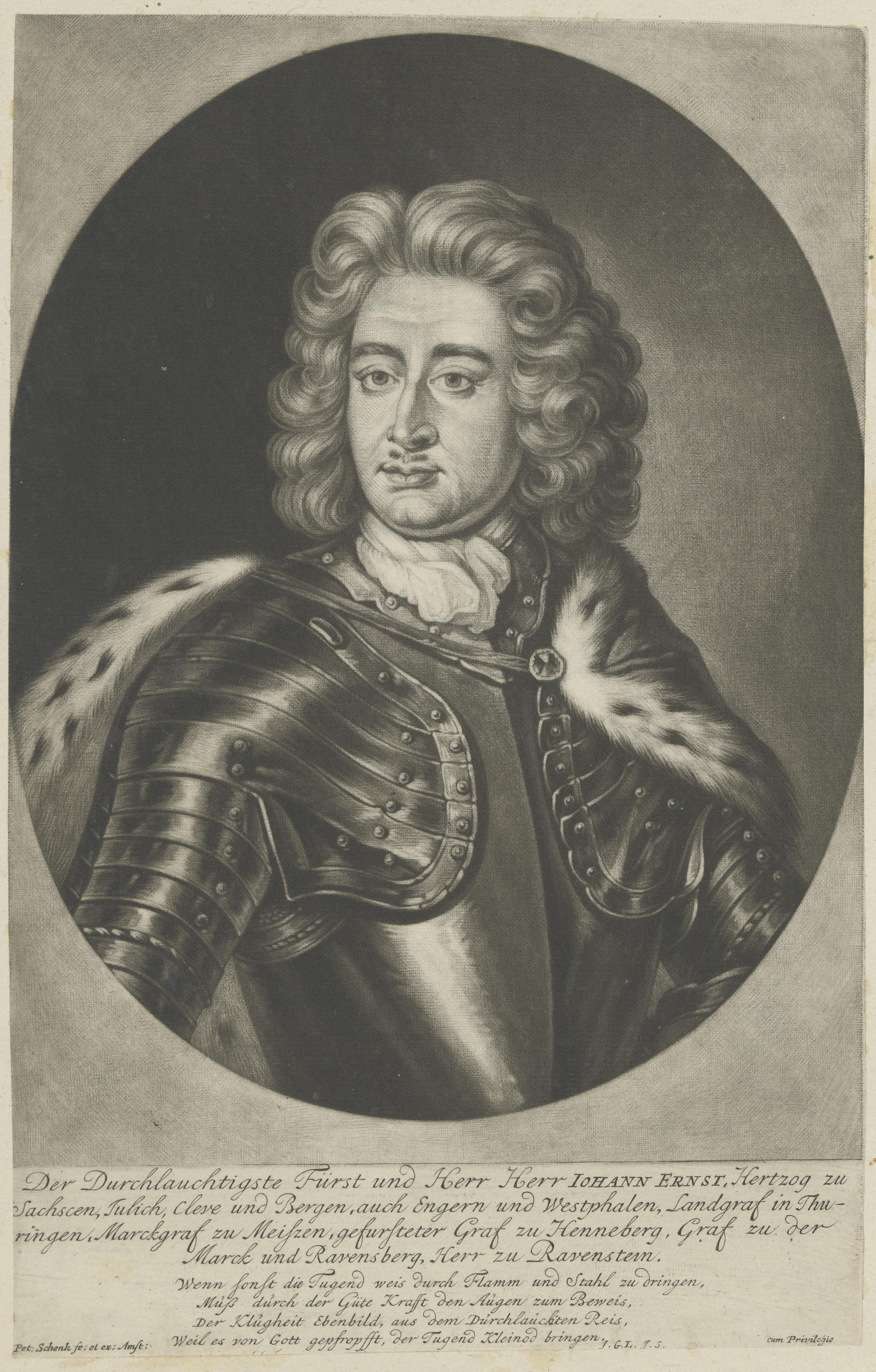

Duke of Saxe-Weimar
- Reign: 1683–1707
- Predecessor: Johann Ernst II
- Successor: Ernst August I
- Born: 22 June 1664; Weimar
- Died: 10 May 1707 (aged 42); Weimar
- Spouse: Sophie Auguste of Anhalt-Zerbst (m. 1685; died 1694) Charlotte Dorothea Sophia of Hesse-Homburg (m. 1694)
- Issue: Prince Johann Wilhelm, Hereditary Duke of Saxe-Weimar; Ernst August I Princess Eleonore Christiane; Princess Johanna Auguste; Princess Johanna Charlotte; Prince Karl Frederick; Prince Johann Ernst; Princess Marie Luise; Princess Christiane Sophie
- House: Wettin (Ernestine line)
- Father: Johann Ernst II, Duke of Saxe-Weimar
- Mother: Christine Elisabeth of Schleswig-Holstein-Sonderburg

Johann Ernst III (22 June 1664 in Weimar – 10 May 1707 in Weimar), was a duke of Saxe-Weimar.

== Johann Sebastian Bach and Weimar ==
In the first half of 1703, Johann Sebastian Bach served as a court musician at Weimar. He was still in his teens and developing a reputation as an organist. Little is known of his precise role (he may have been taken on as a violinist rather than a keyboardist), but as a mere musician, he most likely was considered a servant. He left to take up a position as organist of a church at Arnstadt.

Bach returned to Weimar in 1708, after Johann Ernst's death, as court organist. Bach worked with one of Johann Ernst's sons, also called Johann Ernst, who had a keen interest in music. The prince's interest in collecting music was sufficiently well known that in 1713, when one of Bach's pupils, P. D. Kräuter, was requesting leave of absence to study in Weimar, he mentioned the French and Italian music that the prince was expected to introduce there. The prince also composed, and Bach wrote the Organ Concerto No.1 in G Major, BWV 592, and Concerto for Organ solo in C major, BWV 595, after a theme by the prince.

== Ancestors ==
Ancestors of John Ernest III

8. John II, Duke of Saxe-Weimar
4. Wilhelm, Duke of Saxe-Weimar
9. Dorothea Maria of Anhalt
2. Johann Ernst II, Duke of Saxe-Weimar
10. Johann Georg I, Prince of Anhalt-Dessau
5. Eleonore Dorothea of Anhalt-Dessau
11. Countess Palatine Dorothea of Simmern
1. Johann Ernst III, Duke of Saxe-Weimar
12. Alexander, Duke of Schleswig-Holstein-Sonderburg
6. John Christian, Duke of Schleswig-Holstein-Sonderburg
13. Dorothea of Schwarzburg-Sondershausen
3. Christine Elisabeth of Schleswig-Holstein-Sonderburg
14. Anton II, Count of Oldenburg-Delmenhorst
7. Anna of Oldenburg-Delmenhorst
15. Sibylle Elisabeth of Brunswick-Dannenberg

John Ernest III House of Wettin Born: 22 June 1664 Died: 10 May 1707
| Preceded by Johann Ernst II | Duke of Saxe-Weimar; 1683-1707; With: Wilhelm Ernst | Succeeded by Ernst August I |
