= John Christian, Duke of Schleswig-Holstein-Sonderburg =

17th Century Duke

John Christian
- Duke of Schleswig-Holstein-Sonderburg
- Born: 26 April 1607; Löhne
- Died: 30 June 1653 (aged 46); Sønderborg
- Noble family: Schleswig-Holstein-Sonderburg
- Spouse: Anna of Oldenburg-Delmenhorst
- Father: Alexander, Duke of Schleswig-Holstein-Sonderburg
- Mother: Dorothea of Schwarzburg-Sondershausen

John Christian, Duke of Schleswig-Holstein-Sonderburg (Danish: Hans Christian af Slesvig-Holsten-Sønderborg, 26 April 1607 — 30 June 1653) was Duke of Schleswig-Holstein-Sonderburg from 1627 to his death in 1653.

== Life ==
John Christian was the eldest son of Alexander, Duke of Schleswig-Holstein-Sonderburg and Dorothea, daughter of John Günther I, Count of Schwarzburg-Sondershausen. His father had appointed him to be his successor. However, after his father died, his mother took over the administration of the duchy, and John Christian was forced to pay annual compensation for his brothers. This drew the duchy into deep debt. He died in Sønderborg in 1653, and was succeeded by his son Christian Adolf I.

== Marriage and issues ==
John Christian married Anna of Oldenburg and Delmenhorst (1605-1688) on 4 November 1634. They had the following children:

- Dorothea Augusta (30 September 1636 – 28 February 1662), married George III, Landgrave of Hesse-Itter
- Christine Elisabeth (23 June 1638 – 7 June 1679), married John Ernest II, Duke of Saxe-Weimar
- John Frederick (1639 – 1649), died young
- Christian Adolf (3 June 1641 – 2 January 1702)
