= Henri de La Trémoille, 3rd Duke of Thouars =

French general and noble

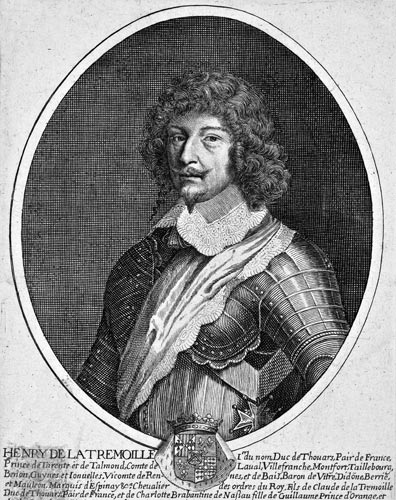
Henri III de la Trémoïlle

Henri de La Trémoille, 3rd Duke of Thouars (22 December 1598 – 21 January 1674) was the 3rd Duke of Thouars, 2nd Duke of La Tremoille, and Prince of Talmond and Taranto. He was the son of Claude de La Trémoille and his wife, Charlotte Brabantina of Nassau, and a descendant of the medieval general Louis II de La Trémoille.

== Family ==
La Trémoille married his first cousin, Marie de La Tour d'Auvergne, in 1619. She was the daughter of Henri de La Tour d'Auvergne, Duke of Bouillon, and his second wife Countess Elisabeth of Nassau. They had five children: Henri Charles, Louis Maurice, Élisabeth, Marie Charlotte de la Trémoille, and Armand-Charles. Henri-Charles inherited his father's Breton holdings in 1661.

== Career ==
La Trémoille's father, Claude, had converted to Protestantism during the French Wars of Religion, but La Trémoille converted to Catholicism around the time Cardinal Richelieu and Louis XIII suppressed the Huguenot rebellion at the siege of La Rochelle in 1628. His wife sent the children to her relatives in the Netherlands, making sure they were brought up Calvinist. She also maintained a Reformed court with church services, something which her husband tolerated.

Following the siege, La Trémoille continued to serve in the French army, being wounded in action in Italy. Following that campaign, La Trémoille switched to a political career.

In 1668, affected by gout, Henri, left the business of his duchy to his elder son. He died on 21 January 1674, at seventy-five years of age, and was buried in Thouars.

== Ancestry and claims ==
La Trémoille was the heir-general of Frederick IV of Naples and his first wife Anne of Savoy, and succeeded to the Cypriot claims to the title of King of Jerusalem when his father died. He was the heir-general of Anne of Savoy, whose daughter Charlotte became in 1499 the de jure heiress of the claim of the Kings of Cyprus to the throne of Jerusalem. Since Frederick IV was the second son of Isabella of Clermont and Ferdinand I of Naples, he also succeeded to the Brienne claims to Kingdom of Jerusalem of his distant cousin John Casimir of Poland at the latter's death 1672, uniting the successions of Brienne and of Cyprus to the de jure crown of Jerusalem.

Henri de La Trémoille, 3rd Duke of Thouars House of La Trémoille Born: 22 December 1598 Died: 21 January 1674
French nobility
Preceded by Claude de La Trémoille	Duc de Thouars; 25 October 1604 – 21 January 1674	Succeeded by Charles Belgique Hollande de La Trémoille
