= John Ernest II =

Johann Ernst II
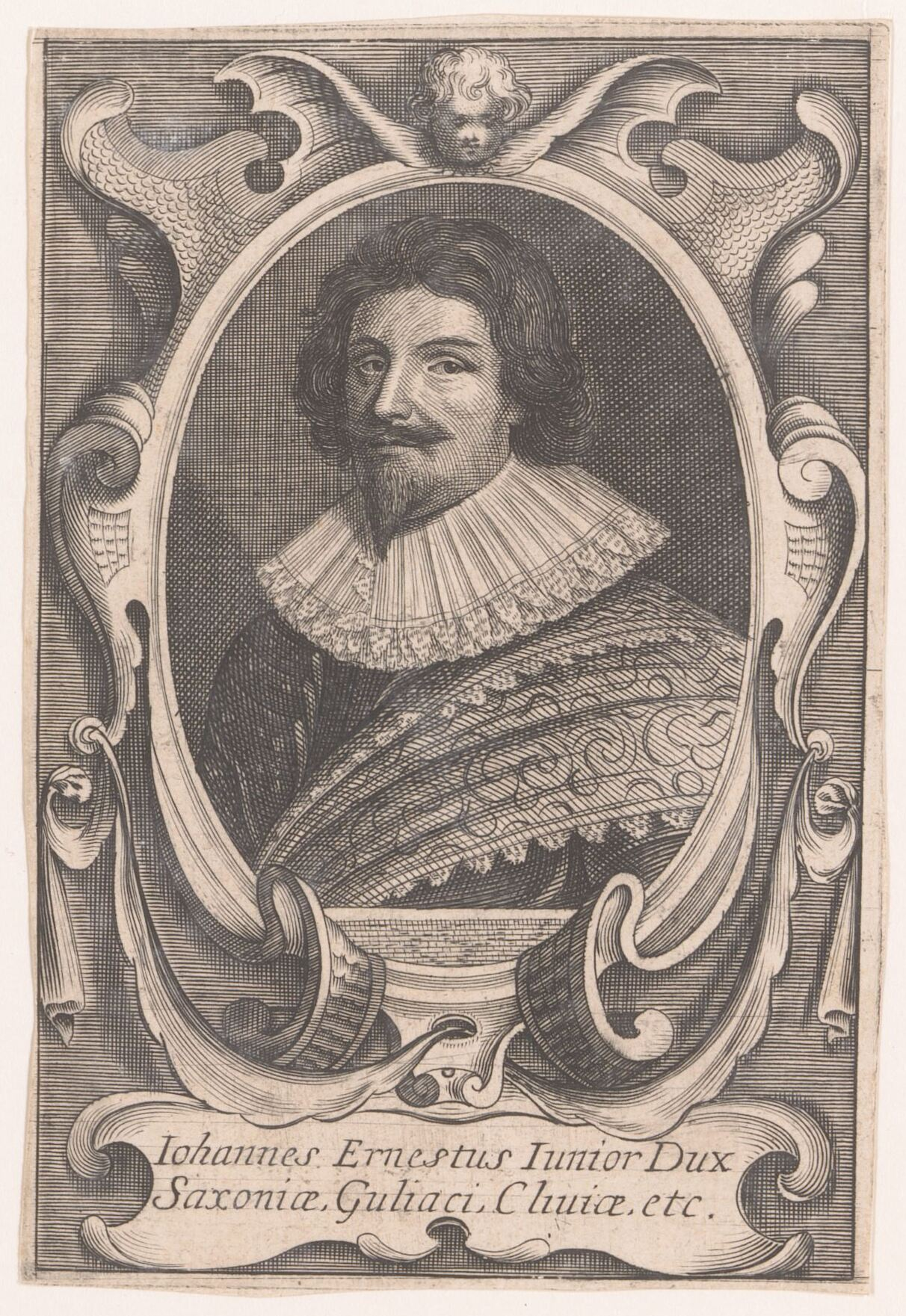
- Engraving, c. 1662–1668

Duke of Saxe-Weimar
- Reign: 1662–1683
- Predecessor: William
- Successor: William Ernest
- Born: 11 September 1627; Weimar
- Died: 15 May 1683 (aged 55); Weimar
- Spouse: Christine Elisabeth of Holstein-Sonderburg
- Issue: Anna Dorothea, Abbess of Quedlinburg; Wilhelmine Christine, Countess of Schwarzburg-Sondershausen; Eleonore Sophie, Duchess of Saxe-Merseburg-Lauchstädt; William Ernest, Duke of Saxe-Weimar; John Ernest III, Duke of Saxe-Weimar
- House: Wettin (Ernestine line)
- Father: William, Duke of Saxe-Weimar
- Mother: Eleonore Dorothea of Anhalt-Dessau

John Ernest II (11 September 1627, in Weimar – 15 May 1683, in Weimar), was a duke of Saxe-Weimar. He was the second but eldest surviving son of William, Duke of Saxe-Weimar, and Eleonore Dorothea of Anhalt-Dessau.

== Life ==
After the death of his father on 1662, he became reigning duke. In 1672 John Ernest divided his possessions with his younger brothers. He retained Weimar, his brother John George I received Eisenach, and his other brother, Bernhard, received Jena. Eventually, the partitioned lands, Saxe-Weimar, Saxe-Eisenach (1741) and Saxe-Jena (1690) were re-combined.

Like his father, John Ernest was particularly interested in the arts (see Fruitbearing Society). He was also an avid hunter. Given his overriding interest in these pursuits, John Ernest entrusted the reigns of government to his chancellor.

In Weimar on 14 August 1656, John Ernest married Christine Elisabeth, (23 June 1638 – 7 June 1679), a daughter of John Christian, Duke of Schleswig-Holstein-Sonderburg (26 April 1607 – 28 June 1653). They had five children:

1. Anna Dorothea (b. Weimar, 12 November 1657 – d. Quedlinburg, 23 June 1704), Abbess of Quedlinburg (1685–1704).
2. Wilhelmine Christine (b. Weimar, 26 January 1658 – d. Sondershausen, 30 June 1712), married on 25 September 1684 to Christian William of Schwarzburg-Sondershausen.
3. Eleonore Sophie (b. Weimar, 22 March 1660 – d. Lauchstädt, 4 February 1687), married on 9 July 1684 to Philipp of Saxe-Merseburg-Lauchstädt.
4. William Ernest, Duke of Saxe-Weimar (b. Weimar, 19 October 1662 – d. Weimar, 26 August 1728).
5. John Ernest III, Duke of Saxe-Weimar (b. Weimar, 22 June 1664 – d. Weimar, 10 May 1707).

== Ancestors ==
Ancestors of John Ernest II

8. John William, Duke of Saxe-Weimar
4. John II, Duke of Saxe-Weimar
9. Dorothea Susanne of Simmern
2. William, Duke of Saxe-Weimar
10. Joachim Ernest, Prince of Anhalt (= 12)
5. Dorothea Maria of Anhalt
11. Eleonore of Württemberg
1. John Ernest II, Duke of Saxe-Weimar
12. Joachim Ernest, Prince of Anhalt (= 10)
6. John George I, Prince of Anhalt-Dessau
13. Agnes of Barby-Mühlingen
3. Eleonore Dorothea of Anhalt-Dessau
14. John Casimir of the Palatinate-Simmern
7. Countess Palatine Dorothea of Simmern
15. Elisabeth of Saxony

== Bibliography ==
- Ernst Wülcker: Johann Ernst, Herzog von Sachsen-Weimar. In: Allgemeine Deutsche Biographie (ADB). Band 14, Duncker & Humblot, Leipzig 1881, S. 360–362.
- Karl Helmrich: Geschichte des Grossherzogthums Sachsen-Weimar-Eisenach, Weimar 1852, S. 102 (Digitalisat)

John Ernest II House of Wettin Born: 11 September 1627 Died: 15 May 1683
Regnal titles
Preceded by William	Duke of Saxe-Weimar; 1662–1683	Succeeded by William Ernest
