= Jagemann =

Jagemann is a surname. Notable people with the surname include:

- Christian Joseph Jagemann (1735–1804), German scholar, court-advisor, and librarian
- Ferdinand Jagemann (1780–1820), German painter, son of Christian and brother of Karoline
- Karoline Jagemann (1777–1848), German tragedienne and singer
