= Schloss Ettersburg =

Coordinates: 51°01′56.62″N 11°16′26.24″E

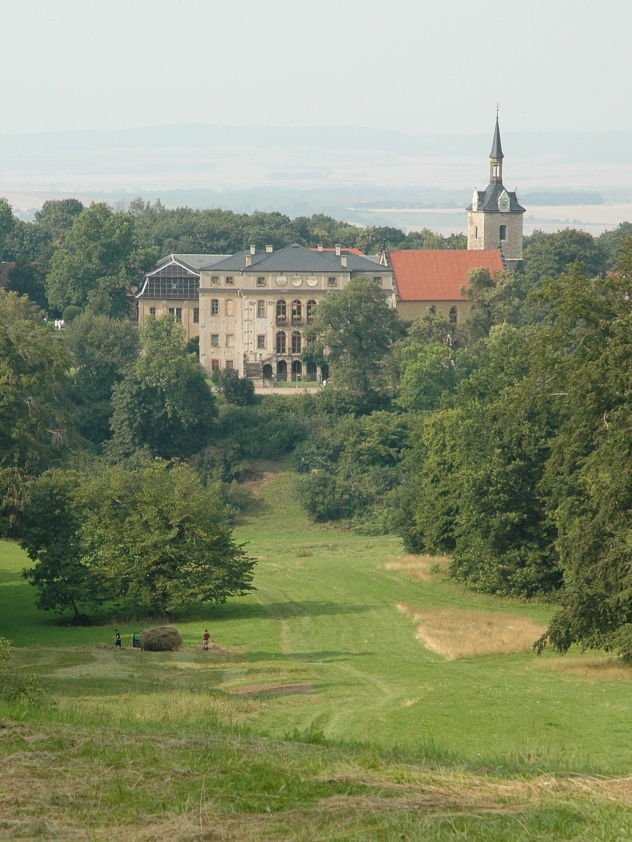
Schloss Ettersburg before restoration

Schloss Ettersburg is a palace with its extended park near Weimar, Thuringia, Germany. It sits on the Ettersberg. From 1998 it has been part of the ensemble Klassisches Weimar, a World Heritage Site.

== History ==
=== Building ===
Schloss Ettersburg was built by Duke Wilhelm Ernst of Saxe-Weimar who liked to hunt in the forests on the Ettersberg, a mountain range of 474 metres (1,555 ft) north of Weimar. The first building was erected between 1706 and 1712 as a simple structure of three wings. The so-called Neues Schloss (New palace) was added in 1722. His nephew, Duke Ernest Augustus, transformed the palace, also adding an outside staircase in the south, between 1728 and 1740. The history of the building and its original furnishings can hardly be traced as the documents were destroyed by fire.

When Karl August was Duke, his mother Anna Amalia used the palace as a summer residence from 1776 to 1780. She held a literary circle of authors such as Wieland, Goethe, Herder, Johann Karl August Musäus, and the actress Corona Schröter. It was also home to the Weimar Liebhabertheater lay theatre. Friedrich Schiller completed his play Maria Stuart there in 1800.

Schloss Ettersburg is one of the most complex hunting resorts of Thuringia.

=== Restoration ===
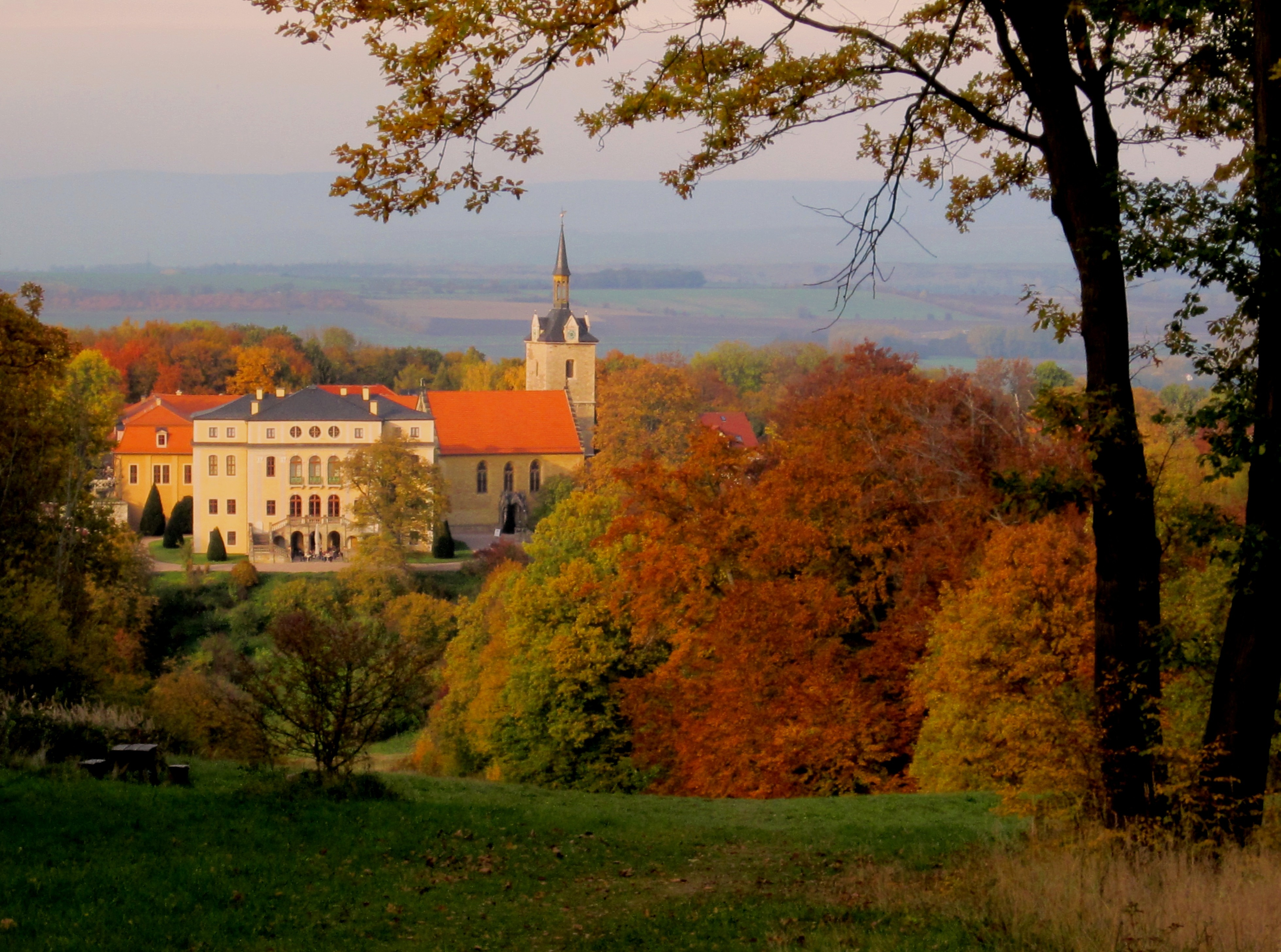
Schloss and park

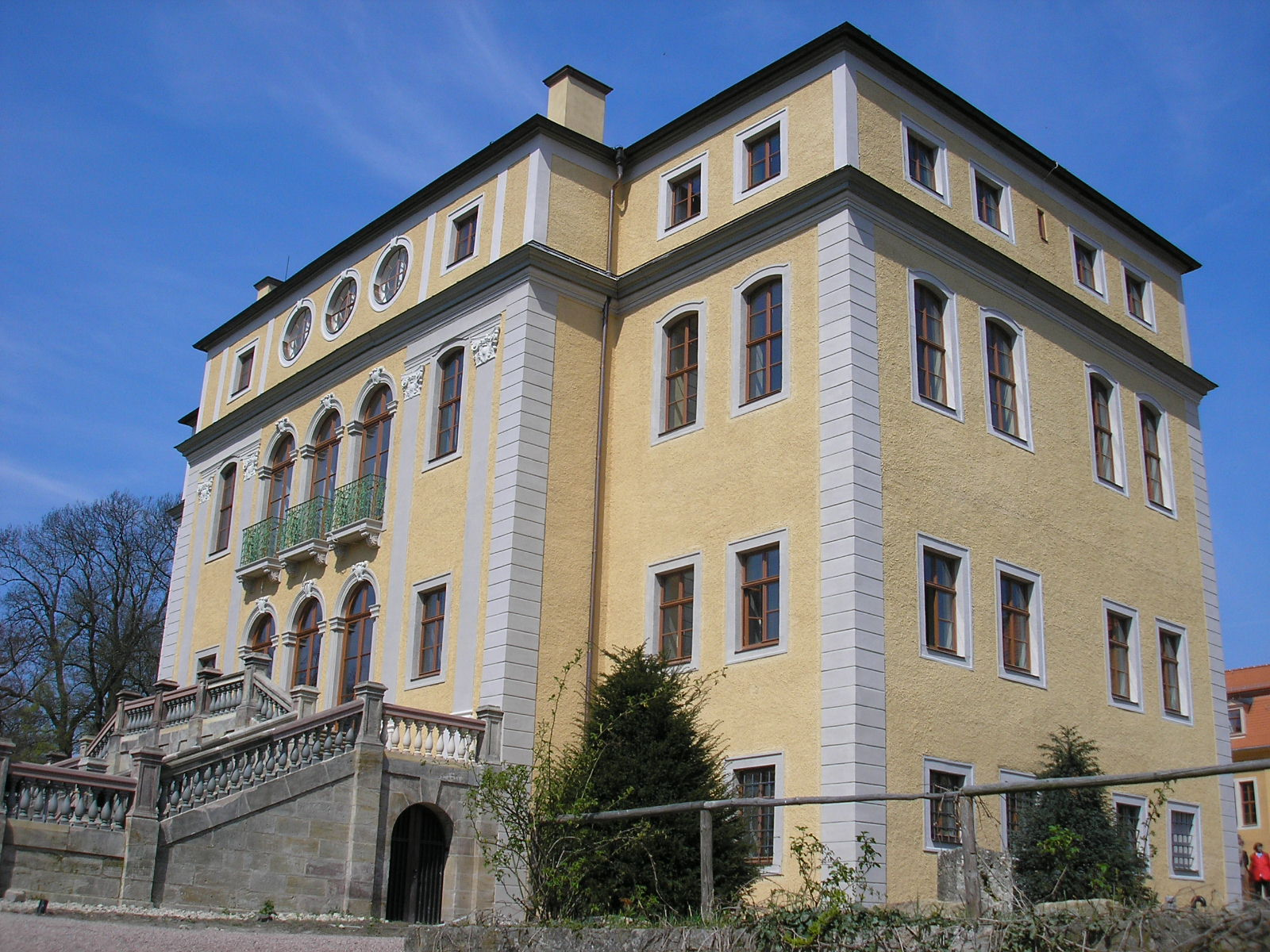
Schloss Ettersburg restored

A substantial restoration began in 2006, supported by a 1990 association Kuratorium Schloss Ettersburg.

Schloss Ettersburg was transformed into a hotel with restaurant and venue for education. It is used mostly by the Bauhaus Akademie Schloss Ettersburg, founded in 2008 as an academy for architects, engineers and other professionals around building. It is also a venue for cultural events such as the Pfingst.Festival Schloss Ettersburg that has offered two weeks of classical, jazz and pop concerts, concerts with recitation, theatre and Ettersburger Gespräche talks, founded in 2011.

The ensemble of palace and park was awarded the 2009 Nationaler Preis für integrierte Stadtentwicklung und Baukultur by the Federal Ministry for Digital and Transport.
