= Ferdinand Jagemann =

German painter (1780–1820)

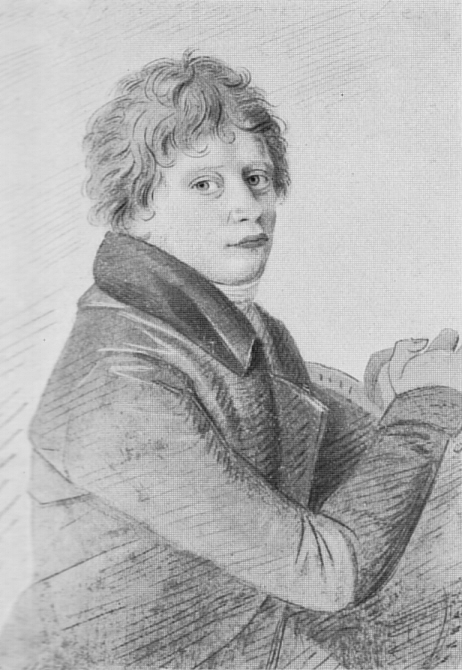
Self-portrait (date unknown)

Ferdinand Jagemann (24 August 1780, Weimar – 9 January 1820, Weimar) was a German painter; known primarily for his portraits.

== Life ==
He was the son of Christian Joseph Jagemann, the librarian for Duchess Anna Amalia of Brunswick-Wolfenbüttel. His sister, the actress Karoline Jagemann, became the mistress of Karl August, Grand Duke of Saxe-Weimar-Eisenach, who helped him begin his artistic studies with Johann Heinrich Tischbein. He later worked with the court painter, Georg Melchior Kraus and Heinrich Friedrich Füger in Vienna.

From 1802 to 1804, he was in Paris, where he may have studied with Jacques-Louis David and Jean-Baptiste Regnault. He then returned to Weimar and became a portrait painter. He was also a professor at the Fürstlichen freien Zeichenschule. In 1805, he drew a portrait of Friedrich Schiller on his deathbed.

From 1806 to 1810, he was studying again; this time in Rome. After 1814, he and Johann Heinrich Meyer served as co-directors of the Zeichenschule. He died of unknown causes at the age of thirty-nine. Johann Wolfgang von Goethe, whom Jagemann had painted on several occasions, delivered a eulogy for him at the Weimar Masonic Lodge. He was buried at the Jacobsfriedhof.

== Selected portraits ==
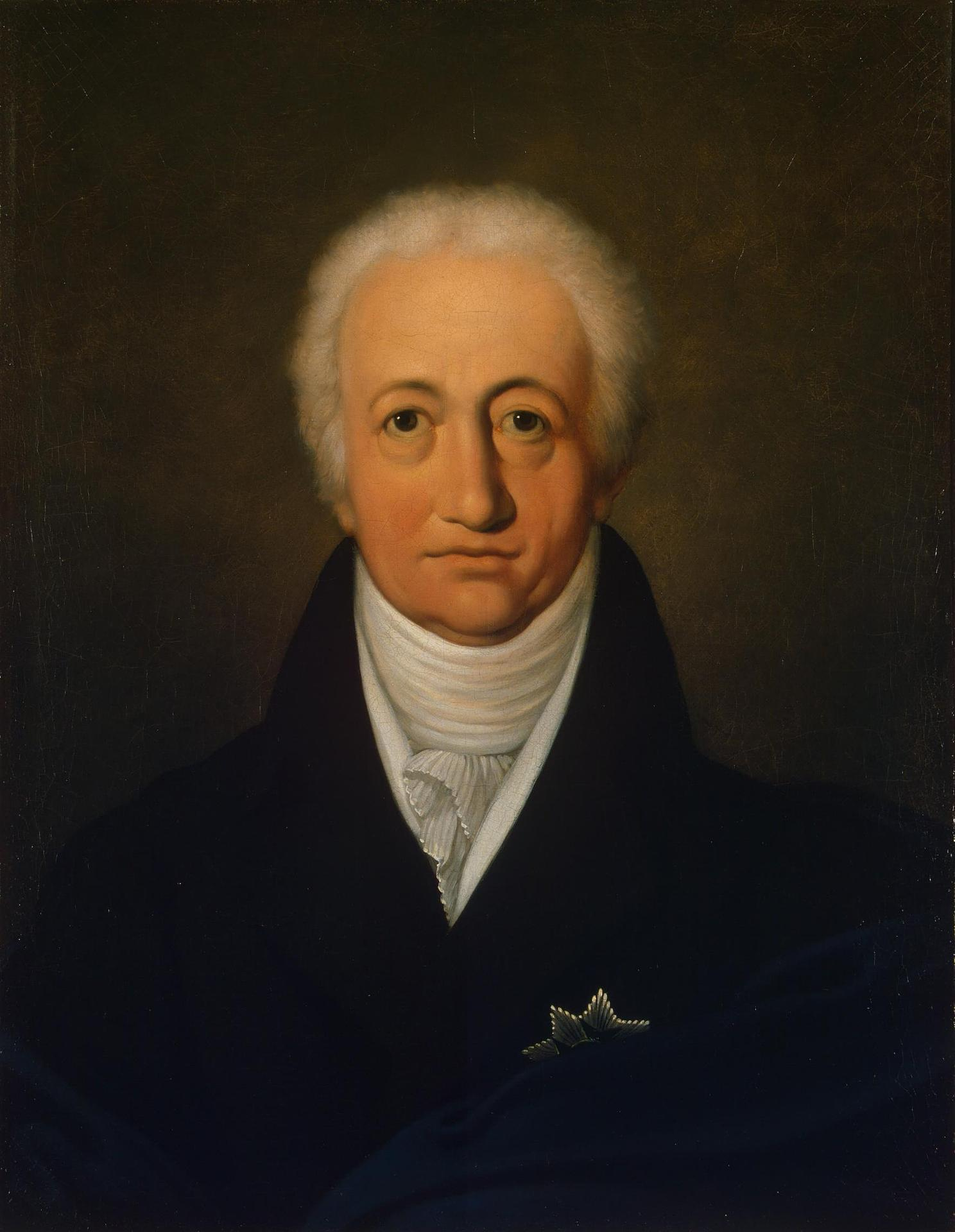
Johann Wolfgang von Goethe, 1818

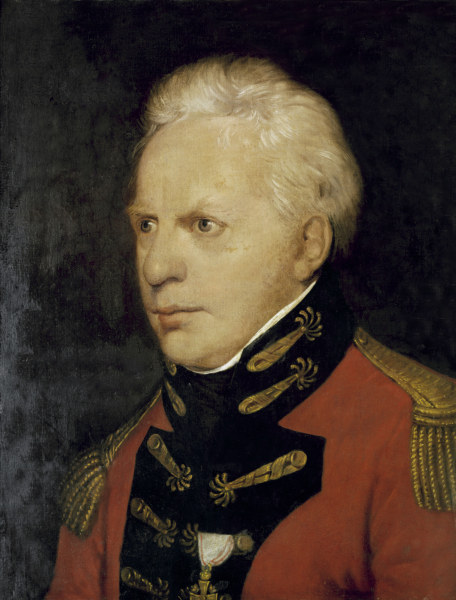
Georg Nikolaus von Nissen, 1809

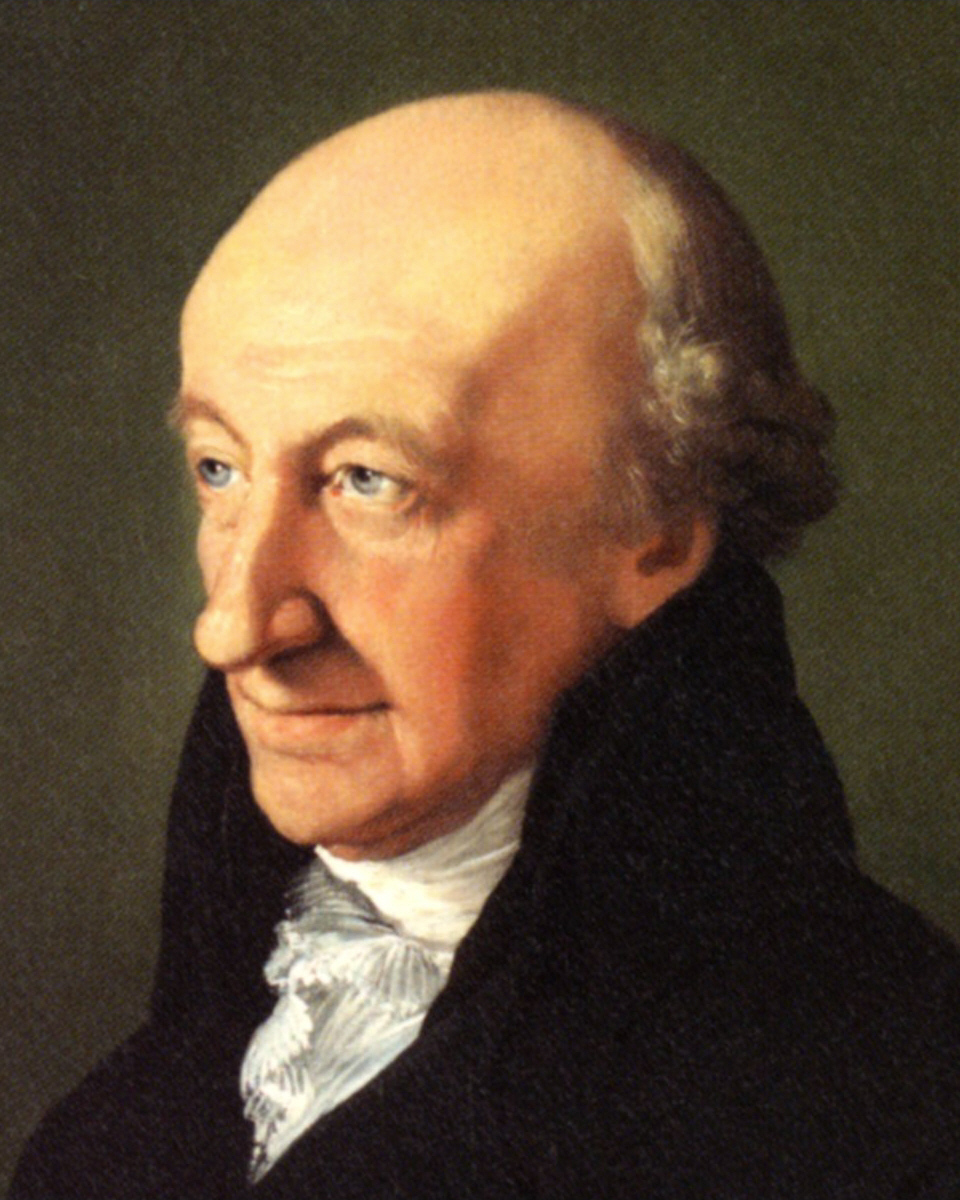
Christoph Martin Wieland, 1805

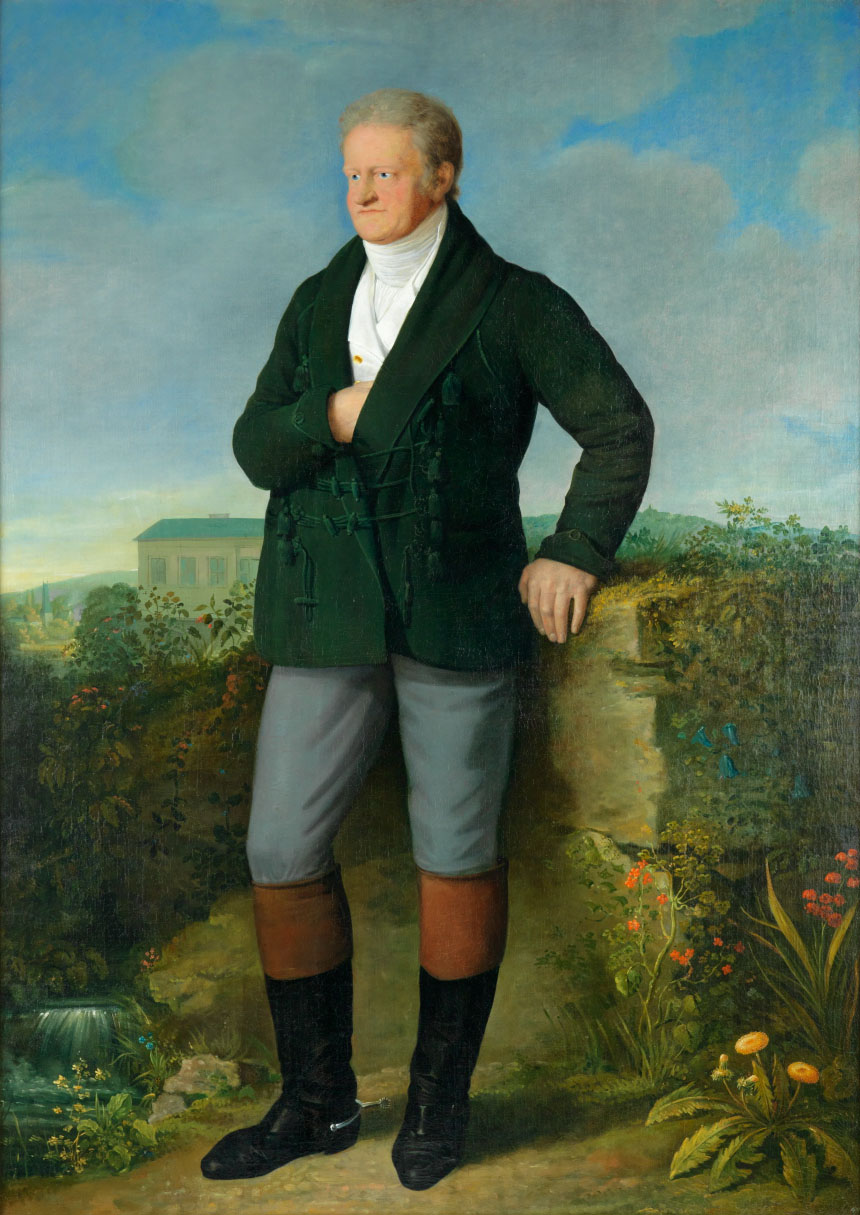
Karl August, Grand Duke of Saxe-Weimar-Eisenach, 1805

== Bibliography ==
- Hans Wahl, Anton Kippenberg: Goethe und seine Welt. Insel-Verlag, Leipzig 1932 S.272f
