= Theodor Wilhelm Danzel =

German literary historian and philosopher (1818–1850)

Theodor Wilhelm Danzel (4 February 1818, Hamburg – 9 May 1850, Leipzig) was a German literary historian and philosopher.

He studied as the universities of Leipzig, Halle and Berlin, obtaining his doctorate at the University of Jena with a thesis on Plato's philosophical methods (1841). As a student, he was an ardent follower of Hegelian philosophy. In 1845 he received his habilitation at Leipzig, where he subsequently worked as a lecturer.

He died in Leipzig on 9 May 1850 at the age of 32.

== Literary works ==
- Über Goethes Spinozismus, Hamburg 1843 - On Goethe's Spinozism.
- Über die Ästhetik der Hegelschen Philosophie, Hamburg 1844 - On the aesthetics of Hegelian philosophy.
- Gottsched und seine Zeit, Leipzig 1848 - Johann Christoph Gottsched and his era.
- G. E. Lessing, sein Leben und seine Werke, (with Gottschalk Eduard Guhrauer), two volumes, 1850–1853 - Lessing, his life and works.
- Gesammelten Aufsätzen, collected essays 1855, edited by Otto Jahn (1813–1869).
