= Heinrich Christoph Kolbe =

German painter (1771–1836)

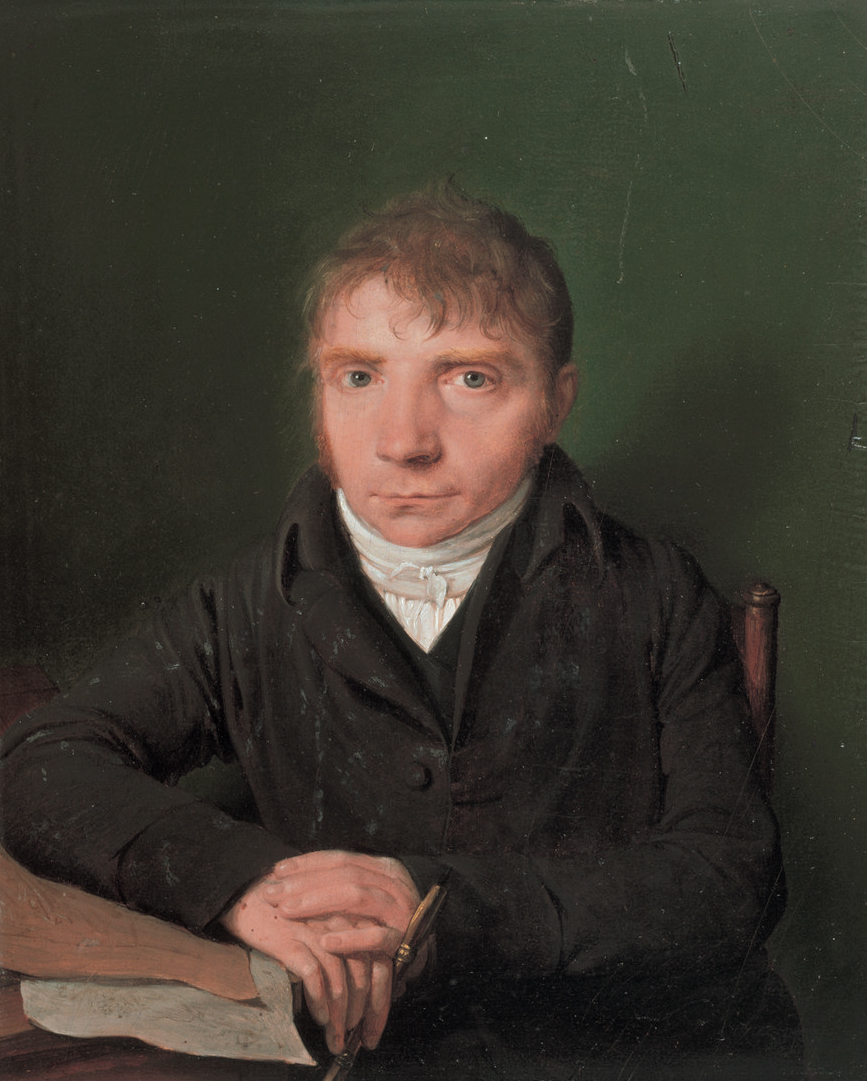
Heinrich Christoph Kolbe; portrait by Johann Peter Krafft

Heinrich Christoph Kolbe (2 April 1771 – 16 January 1836) was a German painter. He is associated with the Düsseldorf school of painting.

== Life ==
Kolbe was born and died in Düsseldorf. After his education at the 'old' Kunstakademie Düsseldorf, and then went to Paris for ten years to study. He was part of the circle of Friedrich Schlegel and worked on the review "Europa". He later worked in the studio of François Gérard. In 1811 he returned to Düsseldorf, becoming the favorite portraitist of the Rhineland, painting 60 portraits in Barmen and Elberfeld alone. His subjects in Weimar included Goethe, Charles Augustus, Grand Duke of Saxe-Weimar-Eisenach and two of Charles Augustus's mistress Karoline Jagemann. From 1822 he was a professor at the Düsseldorf Art Academy, but he left in 1832 after a long dispute with the new director Friedrich Wilhelm Schadow. He died in Düsseldorf in 1836 after a long illness.

== Works ==
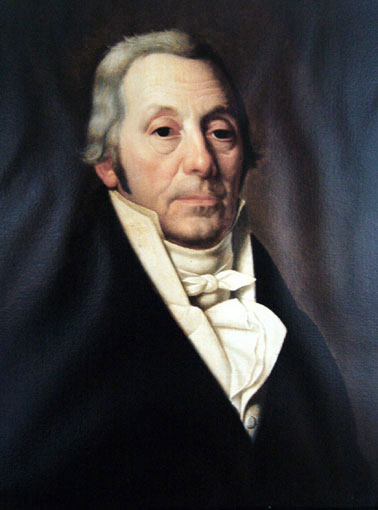
Johann Caspar Engels

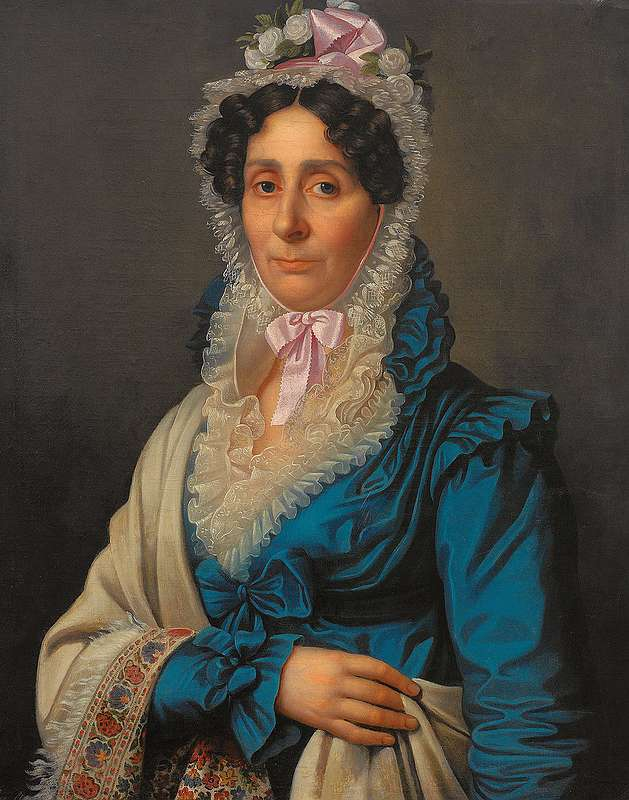
Portrait of a woman

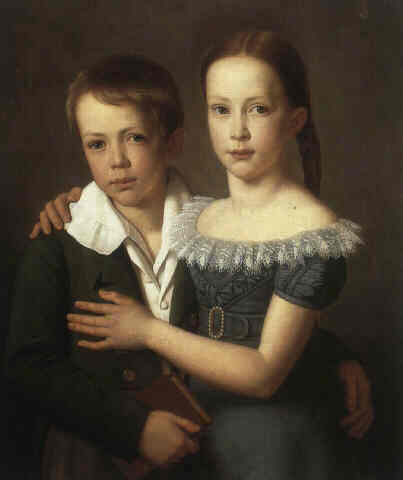
Alwine and Robert Uellenberg

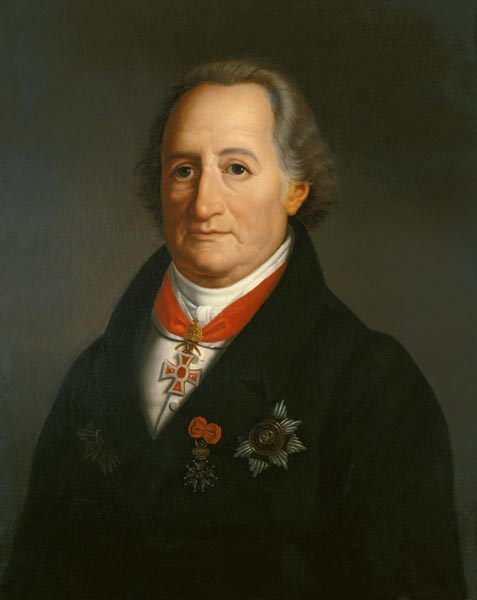
Goethe
