= Christian Joseph Jagemann =

German scholar, court-advisor and librarian

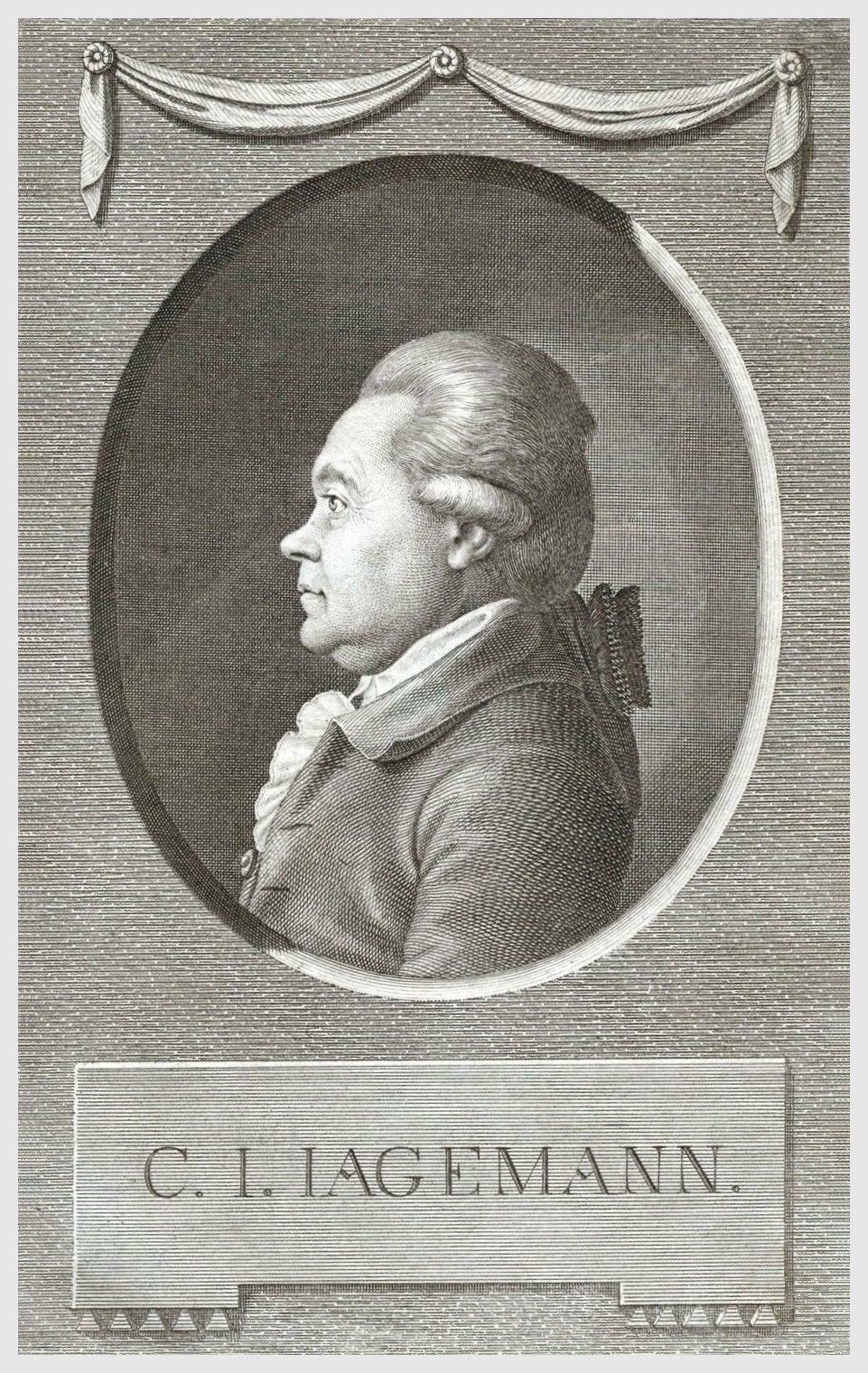
Christian Joseph Jagemann

Christian Joseph Jagemann (1735 in Dingelstädt – 5 February 1804 in Weimar) was a German scholar, court-advisor and librarian.

== Life ==
Against his parents' wishes Christian became a monk, entering the Augustinian monastery at Erfurt in 1752. However, he soon fled to Denmark, where he became a private tutor. He reconciled with his parents and returned home, but then had to go to Rome and Florence as a Catholic priest. After his homecoming he joined the court of the prince of Mainz in 1774 as director of a church gymnasium in Erfurt, but lost this position the following year on the prince's death in 1775. Converting to Protestantism, in 1775 he became advisor and librarian to duchess Anna Amalia in Weimar. By his written works he promoted knowledge of the Italian old masters to Germany. His successor as a librarian was Carl Ludwig Fernow.

== Children ==
- Karoline Jagemann (1777-1848), actress and singer
- Ferdinand Jagemann (1780-1820), painter
- Marianne, (1806 to 1815 )

== Works ==
- 1775: Geographische Beschreibung des Großherzogtums Toskana, Gotha
- 1777: Geschichte der freien Künste und Wissenschaften in Italien, 5 vol, 1777-1781
- 1780: Magazin der italienischen Literatur und Künste, 8 vol, 1780-1785
- 1805: Italienisches Wörterbuch, 4 Bände, 1805

Translations:

- "Die Hölle" from Dante's Göttliche Komödie 1780-1782 (available on www.dantealighieri.dk)
- Goethes "Hermann u. Dorothea." (e-text (Ermanno e Dorotea) on www.dantealighieri.dk),
