= Karl von Heygendorff =

German general (1806–1895)

Karl von Heygendorff (25 December 1806, in Weimar – 17 February 1895, in Dresden) was a German officer in the army of the Kingdom of Saxony, rising to major general.

== Life ==
He was the illegitimate son of Karl August, Grand Duke of Saxe-Weimar-Eisenach and his lover, the actor Karoline Jagemann. He died in 1895. His godfather was Goethe.

== Marriage and issue ==
He married three times:

1. on 1 June 1831, to Meta Abegg; this marriage produced three sons (the first of whom died in infancy) before Meta died in childbirth (1835) after delivery of the last.
2. on 10 October 1836 to Therese von Watzdorf; they had one son and three daughters before the death of Therese in 1841.
3. on 24 December 1848, to Rosa, Freiherrin von Koenneritz. They had one son.
