= Prince Frederick Ferdinand Constantin of Saxe-Weimar-Eisenach =

Saxon general (1758–1793)

Prince Frederick Ferdinand Constantin
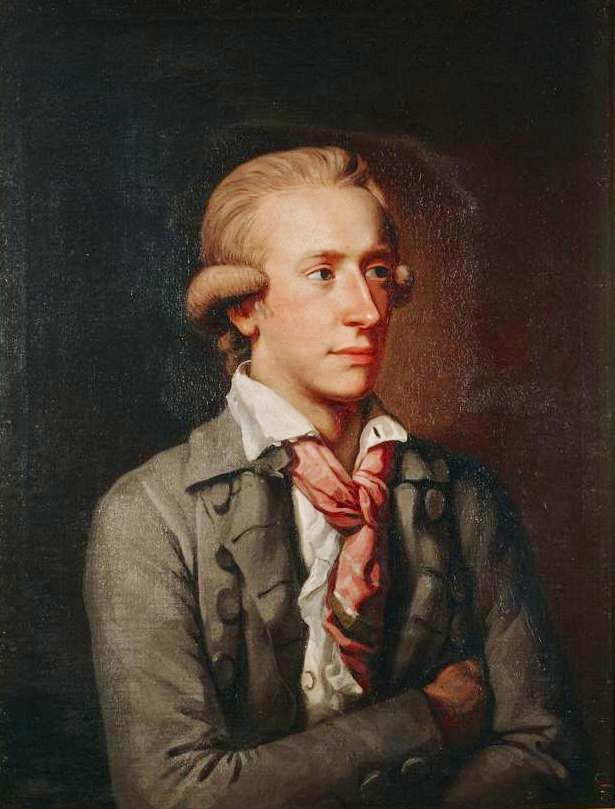
- Portrait of Frederick, 1790
- Born: 8 September 1758; Weimar
- Died: 6 September 1793 (aged 34); Wiebelskirchen, now part of Neunkirchen
- Burial: St. George Church in Eisenach
- House: House of Saxe-Weimar-Eisenach
- Father: Ernest Augustus II, Duke of Saxe-Weimar-Eisenach
- Mother: Anna Amalia of Brunswick-Wolfenbüttel

Prince Friedrich Ferdinand Constantin of Saxe-Weimar-Eisenach (8 September 1758 in Weimar – 6 September 1793 in Wiebelskirchen, now part of Neunkirchen) was a titular Duke of Saxe-Weimar-Eisenach and a major general in the army of the Electorate of Saxony. He lived during the Age of Enlightenment.

== Life ==
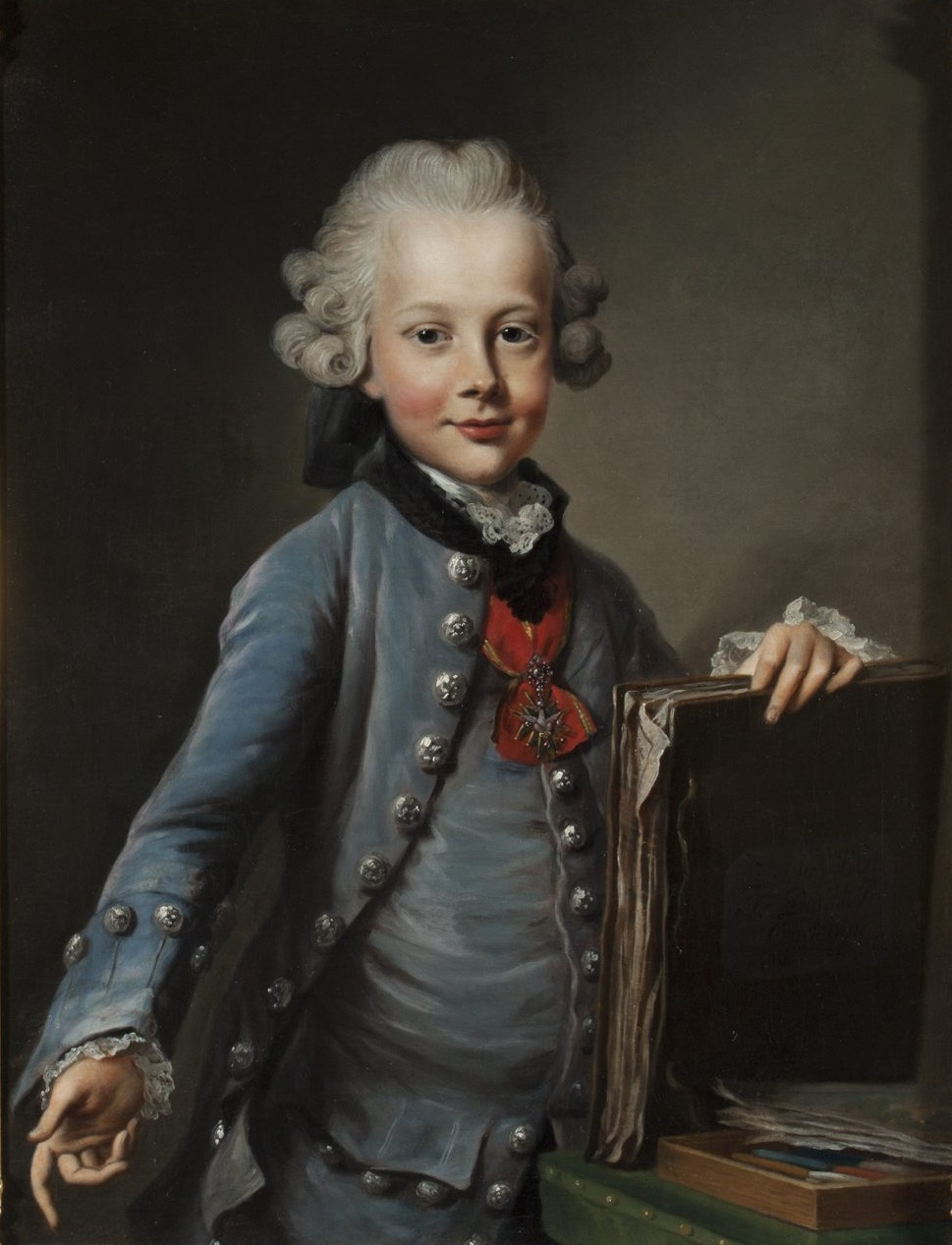
Prince Frederick as a child in 1769

Prince Frederick Ferdinand Constantine was a younger son of Ernest Augustus II Constantine (1737-1758) from his marriage to Anna Amalia (1739-1807), the daughter of Charles I, Duke of Brunswick-Wolfenbüttel. He was born three months after the death of his father, while his mother and his grandfather were acting as ducal regents for his older brother Charles Augustus.

Frederick and his brother were educated by the Hofmeister, Johann Eustach von Görtz and later by Christoph Martin Wieland. After his brother had come of age, Frederick's education was continued by Karl Ludwig von Knebel. Görtz and Knebel accompanied Frederick during his Grand Tour to Paris. In Frankfurt, they met Johann Wolfgang von Goethe.

After his return to Weimar in 1775, Frederick moved into Tiefurt House. He was introverted, and at this time, he had already alienated from his brother. Later, he found himself unable to build up a relationship with his sister-in-law or with Goethe. He turned to music and fell in love with Caroline von Ilten. However, his relatives and Goethe held that she was lower nobility, and therefore unsuitable for a marriage and he had to end the relationship. Goethe wrote to Charlotte von Stein: ... "I am being blamed for Caroline's tears, and I'm guilty." Anna Amalia, Frederick's mother, held that only "beggar princes" would fall in love with ladies below their station. Frederick then went travelling. His brother Charles Augustus wrote to Knebel that he had received a letter from London, which "... had no contents, except he wishes me a happy birthday."

After mediation by his brother, Frederick joined the army of the Electorate of Saxony. He was promoted to lieutenant general and maintained a regiment in Naumburg. During the War of the First Coalition, he was a major general. His regiment marched to the Rhine with a Prussian army. He was infected with dysentery when his regiment was encamped near Pirmasens and died when they reached Wiebelskirchen (today part of Neunkirchen). He was buried in the St. George church in Eisenach.

He died unmarried.
