= Corona Schröter =

German musician (1751–1802)

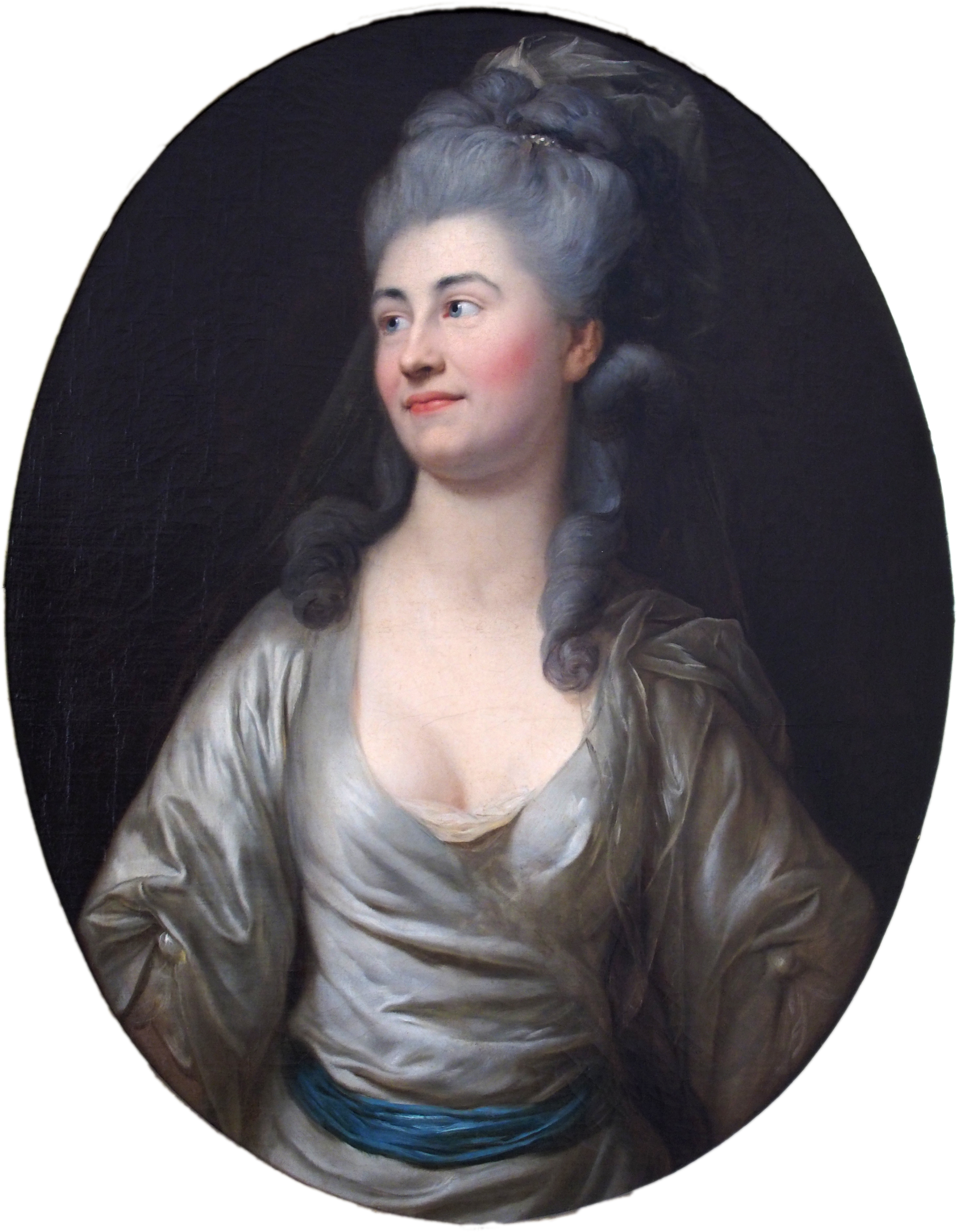
Corona Schröter, painting by Anton Graff

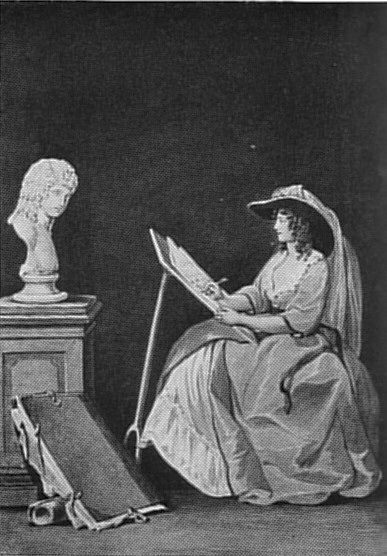
Corona Schröter drawing a bust of Johann Wolfgang Goethe

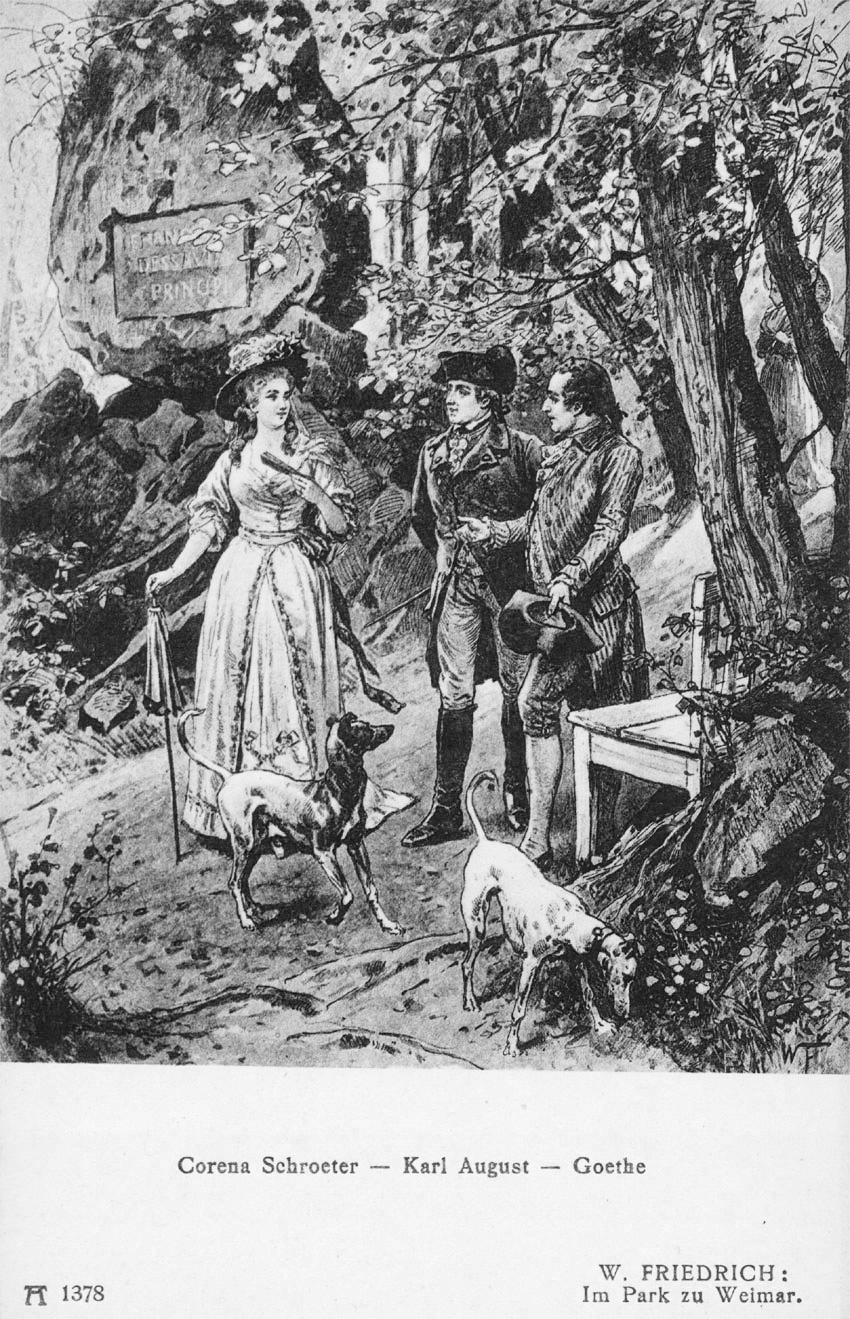
Corona Schröter, Karl August, Grand Duke of Saxe-Weimar-Eisenach, and Johann Wolfgang Goethe, in the park at Weimar

Corona Elisabeth Wilhelmine Schröter (14 January 1751 – 23 August 1802) was a German actress and musician best known as a singer. She also composed songs, setting texts by Friedrich Schiller and Johann Wolfgang von Goethe to music.

== Early life ==
Schröter was born in Guben, Holy Roman Empire. In her early years she studied many instruments, which included the keyboard and guitar. Her father, Johann Friedrich Schröter, an oboist, was her first teacher, who also taught his three other children music. Her brothers, Johann Samuel and Johann Heinrich, were a pianist and a violinist respectively, and her sister, Marie Henriette, was also a singer. While she received early musical training which contributed to her skill in performance and composition, Corona's early vocal training was damaging to her singing voice.

When she was thirteen, Schröter and her family moved to Leipzig. It was there that she caught the attention of composer Johann Adam Hiller (it is thought that Hiller's wife was Corona's godmother). Hiller, an operatic and singspiel composer, had become seriously frustrated with the inadequate education offered to women. To remedy this, in 1771 Hiller opened his own school. In this coeducational setting, students learned a wide variety of musical subjects, including solfège, diction, technique, Italian, and the keyboard. Schröter flourished as a singer, and benefited from the non-damaging technique she learned. Corona was a powerful performer, but was often compared to her fellow student and rival, Gertrud Schmeling (Madame Mara) in Hiller's Grosse Konzerte series. Schröter's voice was not as powerful as Schmeling's, due to her poor early training. However, she had an intensity which her admirers considered to be unrivaled.

== Later life in Weimar ==
During her time at Hiller's school, Schröter became good friends with Johann Wolfgang von Goethe, and when he moved to Weimar in 1775 he brought her along as a court singer for Duchess Anna Amalia. She first performed in the court on 23 November 1776. However, while she was employed as a singer, Corona became involved with the amateur court theatre, performing in at least eighteen productions, many of which were written by Goethe himself. Corona and Goethe collaborated on many of his most popular plays. On a few occasions, he starred opposite her, as in the performance of his play Iphigenie auf Tauris in 1779 in which she played Iphigenia. Goethe's singspiel Die Fischerin was especially important to Schröter. She not only starred in the leading role of Dortchen, but composed incidental music for the play, including the famous opening song Der Erlkönig, which is quite different from the version composed by Franz Schubert over 30 years later - unsurprisingly, Schröter's version is closer to the early Classical era lied tradition in the style of Zelter than to the Romantic version of Schubert. Corona also starred in Goethe's drama Proserpina in which she drew crowds for this "virtuosic solo work."

Corona and Goethe worked closely on compositions which were performed in the Weimar theater as well as published for their personal libraries between 1776 and 1782.

When the amateur court theatre was replaced by professional actors in 1783, she continued to sing and act in informal settings. She also began to teach singing and took up writing and art. She formally withdrew from all court performing in 1788. She became friends with Friedrich Schiller during those years, whose poems she later set to music. Unfortunately, these lieder are lost, as are her two dramas, hundreds of arias and duets, and an autobiography given to Goethe in 1778. However, two collections of lieder were published by her, the first in 1786, followed by another in 1794, thus surviving into the present time. The first collection, which contains her rendition of Der Erlkönig from Goethe's play, was more popular than the second, probably due to its simpler nature: the second contained many songs in French and Italian. These two collections are some of the first and largest publications of lieder by a woman. When the first collection was released, Schröter had this to say about her work:

I have had to overcome much hesitation before I seriously made the decision to publish a collection of short poems that I have provided with melodies. A certain feeling towards propriety and morality is stamped upon our sex, which does not allow us to appear alone in public, and without an escort: Thus, how can I otherwise present this, my musical work to the public, than with timidity? For the complimentary opinions and the encouragement of a few persons… can easily be biased out of pity. The work of any lady, moreover, will indeed arouse similar pity to some extent in the eyes of other experts.

A review of this first collection said that Schröter's abilities for composing were not equal to her potential. The reviewer felt that the songs had much spirit in them, but were not written in a way that brought this out. He did say that the performances of these pieces were helpful to understanding the depth of them. Ultimately, he blamed this deficiency on her lack of education, a real problem for women in this period of time.

Corona Schröter was also immortalized in other ways. In 1782, during a eulogy for a deceased theatre director, Goethe praised her for her help in shaping theatre in Weimar, and himself. Seven years earlier, a work about theatre history was dedicated to her due to her well-known abilities.

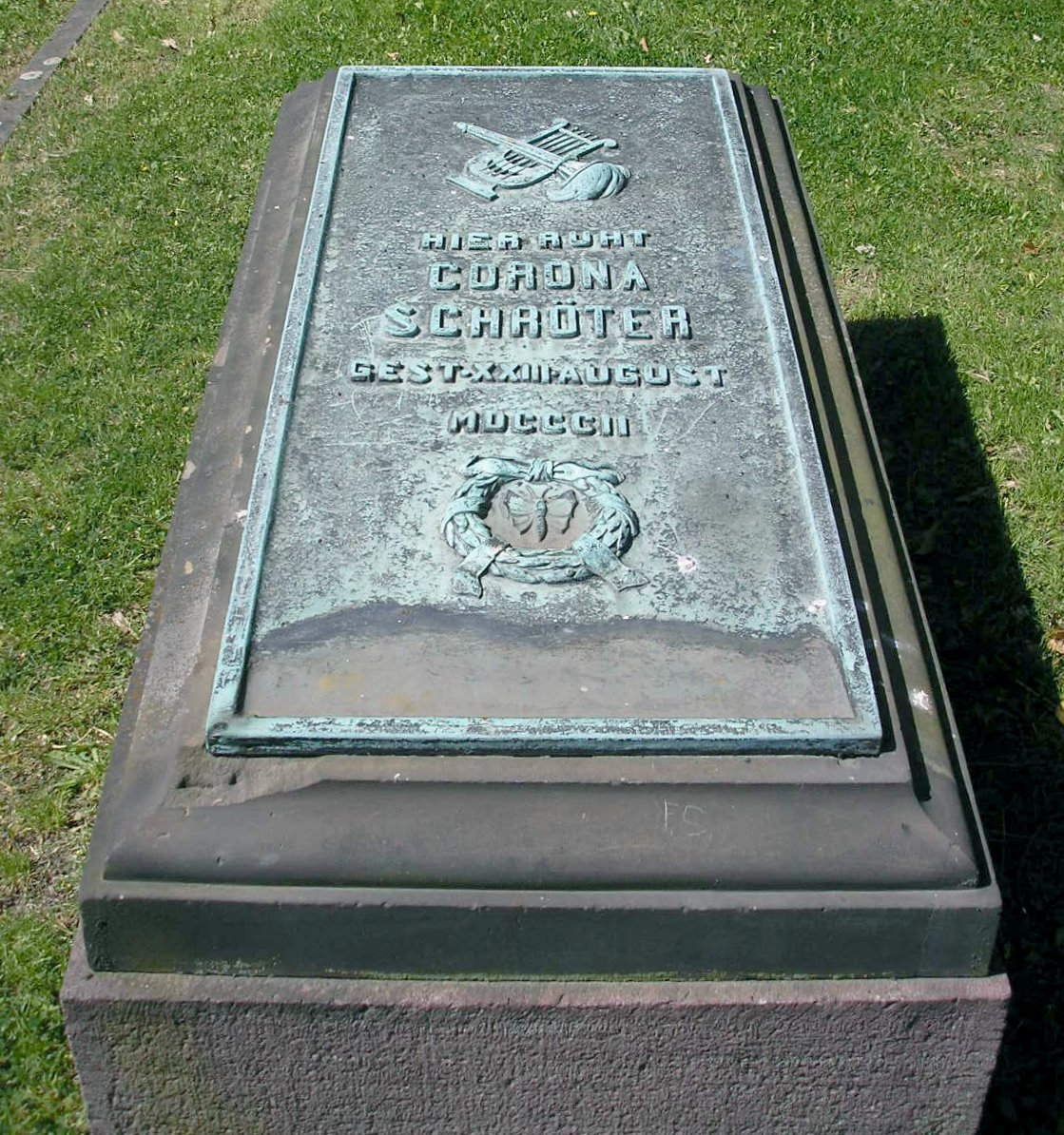
Corona Schröter's grave at Ilmenau

She spent the last eight years of her life teaching acting and singing. However, lung and respiratory problems forced her to move from Leipzig to Ilmenau with her long-time friend Wilhemine Probst in 1801. Her condition was so serious that she never recovered and died there a year later.
