= Ernest Augustus II of Saxe-Weimar-Eisenach =

Duke of Saxe-Weimar-Eisenach from 1748 to 1758

Ernest Augustus II
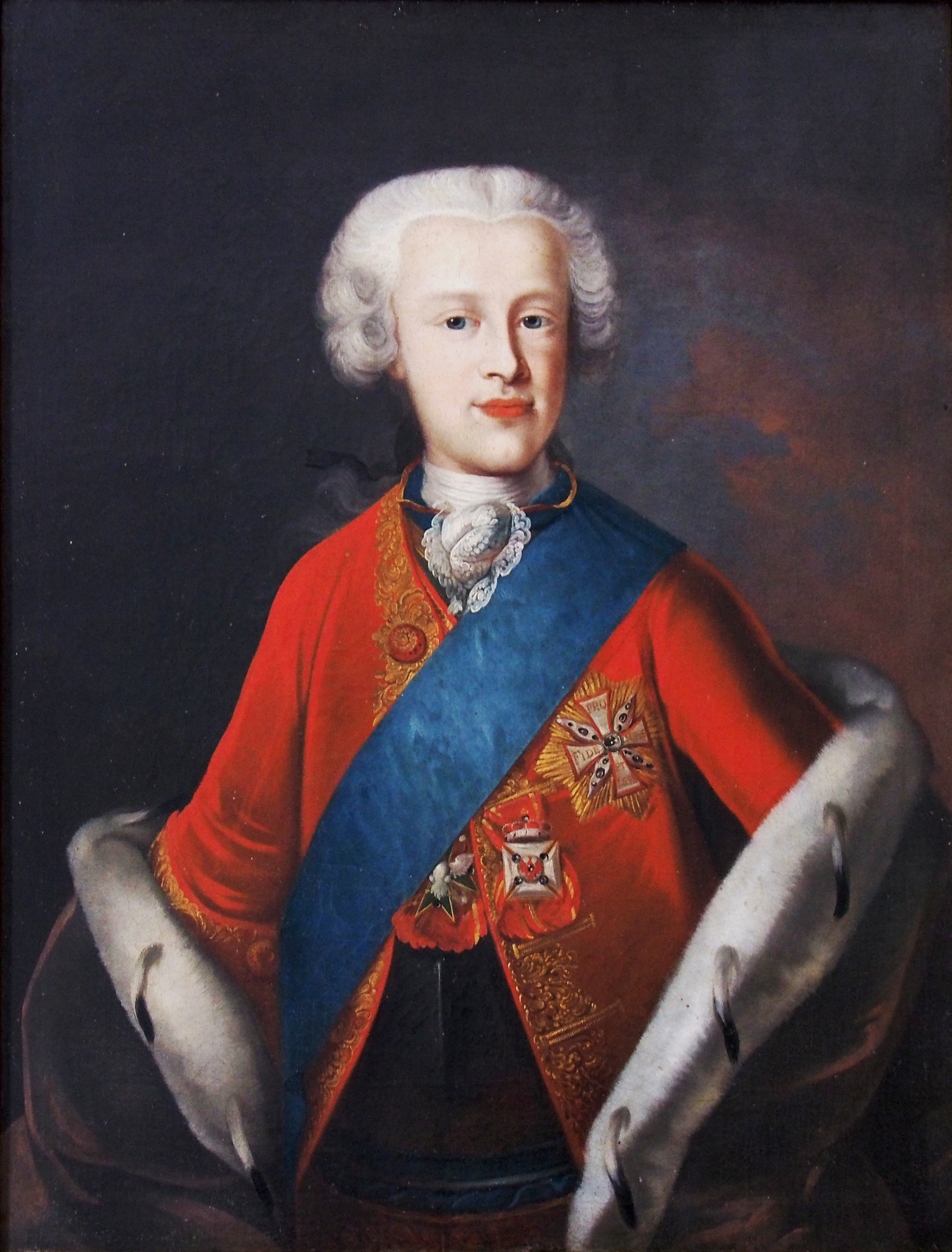
- 18th-century portrait

Duke of Saxe-Weimar
- Reign: 1748–1758
- Predecessor: Ernest Augustus I
- Successor: Charles Augustus
- Regent: Duke Francis Josias; Duke Frederick III

Duke of Saxe-Eisenach
- Reign: 1748–1758
- Predecessor: Ernest Augustus I
- Successor: Charles Augustus
- Regent: Duke Francis Josias
- Born: 2 June 1737; Weimar
- Died: 28 May 1758 (aged 20); Weimar
- Spouse: Anna Amalia of Brunswick-Wolfenbüttel (m. 1756)
- Issue: Charles Augustus, Grand Duke of Saxe-Weimar-Eisenach; Prince Frederick Ferdinand Constantin
- House: Saxe-Weimar-Eisenach
- Father: Ernest Augustus I
- Mother: Margravine Sophie Charlotte of Brandenburg-Bayreuth

Ernest Augustus II Constantine (German: Ernst August II Konstantin; 2 June 1737 – 28 May 1758) was the ruling Duke of Saxe-Weimar-Eisenach from 1748 until his death in 1758.

== Early life ==
He was the fifth child but the only surviving son of Ernest Augustus I, Duke of Saxe-Weimar-Eisenach, by his second wife, Margravine Sophie Charlotte of Brandenburg-Bayreuth, the eldest daughter of Georg Friedrich Karl, Margrave of Brandenburg-Bayreuth.

== Career ==
Ernst August II Konstantin's father, a splendor-loving ruler with a passion for hunting, had moved his court to Eisenach. The duke neglected his son and heir, so that Ernst August II Konstantin spent his early years under the supervision of the Hofmarschall of Schloss Belvedere in Weimar.

Ernst August I died in 1748, when Ernst August II Konstantin was eleven years old. Since he was still a minor, the dukes Frederick III of Saxe-Gotha-Altenburg and Franz Josias of Saxe-Coburg-Saalfeld assumed the regency of Saxe-Weimar-Eisenach on Ernst August II Konstantin's behalf. The young duke came to live with Duke Frederick in Gotha, who made sure that Ernst August II Konstantin received an appropriate education.

In 1755 Ernst August II Konstantin assumed the reins of government. He appointed his former tutor, the Imperial Count (Reichsgräf) Heinrich von Bünau, as his new chancellor. Because the young duke had been a sickly child, he was encouraged to marry quickly in order to ensure an heir for the duchy. The bride was chosen from the House of Welf, in particular, from reigning family of the Duchy of Brunswick, which was blood related to almost all European ruling families.

== Marriage ==
In Brunswick on 16 March 1756, Ernst August II Konstantin married Anna Amalia of Brunswick-Wolfenbüttel, the third surviving child and second daughter of Charles I, Duke of Brunswick-Wolfenbüttel and his wife, Princess Philippine Charlotte of Prussia, sister of Frederick the Great. The marriage produced two sons:

1. Karl August, Duke of Saxe-Weimar-Eisenach, Grand Duke from 21 April 1815 (b. Weimar, 3 September 1757 – d. Graditz, 14 June 1828).
2. Frederick Ferdinand Constantine (b. posthumously, Weimar, 8 September 1758 – d. Wiebelskirchen, 6 September 1793) who died unmarried.

== Death ==
Ernst Augustus II Konstantin died on 28 May 1758 in Weimar. When he died, the hereditary prince Karl August was still an infant. Ernst August Konstantin's widow, the Duchess Anna Amalia, presided as regent over an excellent tutelary government which propelled Weimar into the classical period, most prosperous period of the country. He was buried in the Palace Church of Schloss Weimar, but in 1825, his grave was transferred to the Ducal Vault in the Historic Cemetery, Weimar.

== Ancestry ==
Ancestors of Ernest Augustus II of Saxe-Weimar-Eisenach

8. John Ernest II, Duke of Saxe-Weimar
4. John Ernest III, Duke of Saxe-Weimar
9. Princess Christine Elisabeth of Schleswig-Holstein-Sonderburg
2. Ernest Augustus I, Duke of Saxe-Weimar-Eisenach
10. John VI, Prince of Anhalt-Zerbst
5. Princess Sophie Auguste of Anhalt-Zerbst
11. Sophie Augusta of Holstein-Gottorp
1. Ernest Augustus II, Duke of Saxe-Weimar-Eisenach
12. Christian Heinrich, Margrave of Brandenburg-Bayreuth-Kulmbach
6. George Frederick Charles, Margrave of Brandenburg-Bayreuth
13. Sophie Christiane of Wolfstein
3. Margravine Sophie Charlotte of Brandenburg-Bayreuth
14. Frederick Louis, Duke of Schleswig-Holstein-Sonderburg-Beck
7. Princess Dorothea of Schleswig-Holstein-Sonderburg-Beck
15. Princess Louise Charlotte of Schleswig-Holstein-Sonderburg-Augustenburg

Regnal titles
Preceded by Ernst August I	Duke of Saxe-Weimar; 1748-1758	Succeeded by Karl August
Preceded by Ernst August I	Duke of Saxe-Eisenach; 1748-1758	Succeeded by Karl August
