= Gottschalk Eduard Guhrauer =

German philologist and biographer

Gottschalk Eduard Guhrauer (15 May 1809 – 5 January 1854) was a German philologist and biographer. He is known principally for his 1842 biography of Gottfried Wilhelm Leibniz and his completion (1853) of Theodor Wilhelm Danzel's biography of Lessing, G. E. Lessing, sein Leben und seine Werke (1850–53, 2 volumes).

He was born in Bojanowo (then in Grand Duchy of Warsaw, now in Poland) and died in Breslau (now Wrocław, Poland).

He studied philology and philosophy in Breslau and Berlin. Under the influence of the English missionary William Ayerst, Guhrauer converted from Judaism to Christianity in 1835. He traveled to Hanover in 1836 and Paris in 1838 to research Leibniz's biography and works. After his return to Germany, he worked as a librarian at the University of Breslau, where he became a professor in 1843. Guhrauer also wrote on Jean Bodin, Joachim Jungius, the Kurmainz (Electorate of Mainz), and the Latin poem Vaticinium Lehninense.

== Works ==
- Mémoire sur le Projet de Leibnitz Relatif à l'Expedition d'Egypte Proposé à Louis XIV en 1672, Paris, 1839.
- Kur-Mainz in der Epoche von 1672, Hamburg, 1839 - Kurmainz in the era of 1672.
- Lessings Erziehung des Menschengeschlechts, Kritisch und Philosophisch Erörtert ib. 1841 - Lessing's Education of Mankind, critically and philosophically explained.
- Das Heptaplomeres des Jean Bodin, ib. 1841 - The heptaplomeres of Jean Bodin.
- G. W. v. Leibniz, eine Biographie, Breslau, 1842, supplement 1846. - Leibniz, a biography.
- Joachim Jungius und Sein Zeitalter, Stuttgart, 1850. - Jungius and his era.
- Die Weissagung von Lehnin. Eine Monographie, Breslau, 1850.

In addition, he edited Leibniz's Deutsche Schriften (2 volumes: 1838–40), and Goethe's Briefwechsel mit Knebel (Goethe's correspondence with Karl Ludwig von Knebel, 1851).
