= Karl Ludwig von Knebel =

German poet and translator (1744–1834)

Karl Ludwig von Knebel, 1824

Karl Ludwig von Knebel (30 November 1744 – 23 February 1834) was a German poet and translator.

== Biography ==
He was born at the Castle of Wallerstein (near Nördlingen) in Franconia. After having studied law for a short while at Halle, he entered the regiment of the crown prince of Prussia in Potsdam and was attached to it as officer for ten years. Disappointed in his military career, owing to the slowness of promotion, he retired in 1774, and accepting the post of tutor to Prince Frederick Ferdinand Constantin of Saxe-Weimar, accompanied him and his elder brother, the hereditary prince, on a tour to Paris. On this journey he visited Goethe in Frankfurt-on-Main, and introduced him to the hereditary prince, Charles Augustus. This meeting is memorable as being the immediate cause of Goethe's later intimate connection with the Weimar court.

After Knebel's return and the premature death of his pupil he was pensioned, receiving the rank of major. In 1798 he married the singer Luise von Rudorf, and retired to Ilmenau; but in 1805 he moved to Jena, where he lived until his death in 1834.

== Works ==
Knebel's Sammlung kleiner Gedichte (1815), issued anonymously, and Distichen (1827) contain many graceful sonnets, but it is as a translator that he is best known. His translation of the elegies of Propertius, Elegien von Properz (1798), and that of Lucretius, De Rerum Natura (2 vols., 1821) were praised at the time. Also notable is his translation of Vittorio Alfieri's tragedy Saul.

Since their first acquaintance, Knebel and Goethe were intimate friends, and not the least interesting of Knebel's writings is his correspondence with the eminent poet, Briefwechsel mit Goethe (ed. G. E. Guhrauer, 2 vols., 1851). Varnhagen von Ense and Theodor Mundt edited his Literarischer Nachlass und Briefwechsel ("Literary remains and correspondence," 3 volumes, Leipsic, 1835), the latter furnishing a biographical notice.
