= Princess Sophie Charlotte of Brandenburg-Bayreuth =

Sophie Charlotte of Brandenburg-Bayreuth
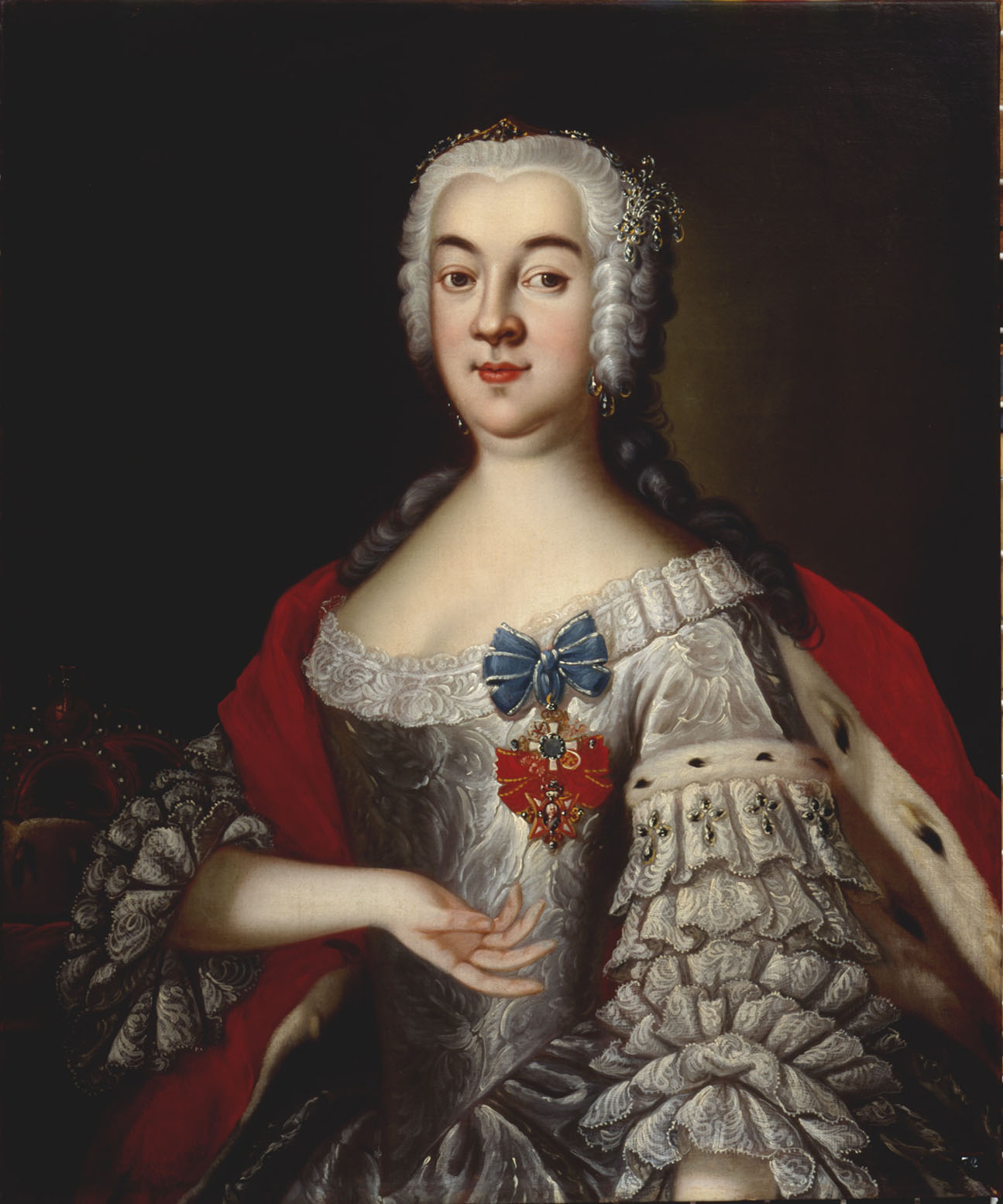
- Portrait c. 1734–1747

Duchess consort of Saxe-Weimar
- Tenure: 1734–1747

Duchess consort of Saxe-Eisenach
- Tenure: 1741–1747
- Born: 27 July 1713; Weferlingen
- Died: 2 March 1747 (aged 33); Ilmenau
- Spouse: Ernest Augustus I, Duke of Saxe-Weimar-Eisenach (m. 1734)
- Issue: Karl August Eugen, Hereditary Prince of Saxe-Weimar; Ernest Augustus II, Duke of Saxe-Weimar-Eisenach; Princess Eleonore Christiane; Princess Johanna Auguste; Ernestine, Duchess of Saxe-Hildburghausen; Prince Ernst Adolf
Names
- Sophie Charlotte Albertine
- House: House of Hohenzollern
- Father: George Frederick Charles, Margrave of Brandenburg-Bayreuth
- Mother: Dorothea of Schleswig-Holstein-Sonderburg-Beck

Princess Sophie Charlotte of Brandenburg-Bayreuth (Sophie Charlotte Albertine; 27 July 1713 – 2 March 1747), was a German noblewoman member of the House of Hohenzollern and by marriage Duchess of Saxe-Weimar and Saxe-Eisenach.

Born in Weferlingen, she was the fourth of five children born from the marriage of George Frederick Charles, Margrave of Brandenburg-Bayreuth and Princess Dorothea of Schleswig-Holstein-Sonderburg-Beck. In 1716 her mother was convicted of adultery and imprisoned; she probably never saw her again.

== Life ==
In Bayreuth on 7 April 1734, Sophie Charlotte married Ernest Augustus I, Duke of Saxe-Weimar as his second wife. They had four children:

1. Charles Augustus Eugen, Hereditary Prince of Saxe-Weimar (Weimar, 1 January 1735 – Weimar, 13 September 1736).
2. Ernest Augustus II Konstantin, Duke of Saxe-Weimar-Eisenach (Weimar, 2 June 1737 – Weimar, 28 May 1758).
3. Ernestine Auguste Sophie (Weimar, 4 January 1740 – Hildburghausen, 10 June 1786), married on 1 July 1758 to Ernst Frederick III Karl, Duke of Saxe-Hildburghausen.
4. Ernest Adolph Felix (born and died Weimar, 23 January 1741 / b. Weimar, 1742 – d. Weimar, 1743) [?].

On 26 July 1741 she also became the Duchess consort of Saxe-Eisenach after her husband inherited that land.

Sophie Charlotte died in Ilmenau aged 33. She was buried there.

Princess Sophie Charlotte of Brandenburg-Bayreuth House of Hohenzollern Born: 27 July 1713 Died: 2 March 1747
German royalty
Vacant Title last held by Eleonore Wilhelmine of Anhalt-Köthen	Duchess consort of Saxe-Weimar; 1734–1747	Vacant Title next held by Anna Amalia of Brunswick-Wolfenbüttel
Preceded by Anna Sophie Charlotte of Brandenburg-Schwedt	Duchess consort of Saxe-Eisenach; 1741–1747	Vacant Title next held by Anna Amalia of Brunswick-Wolfenbüttel
