= Karl August, Grand Duke of Saxe-Weimar-Eisenach =

Charles Augustus
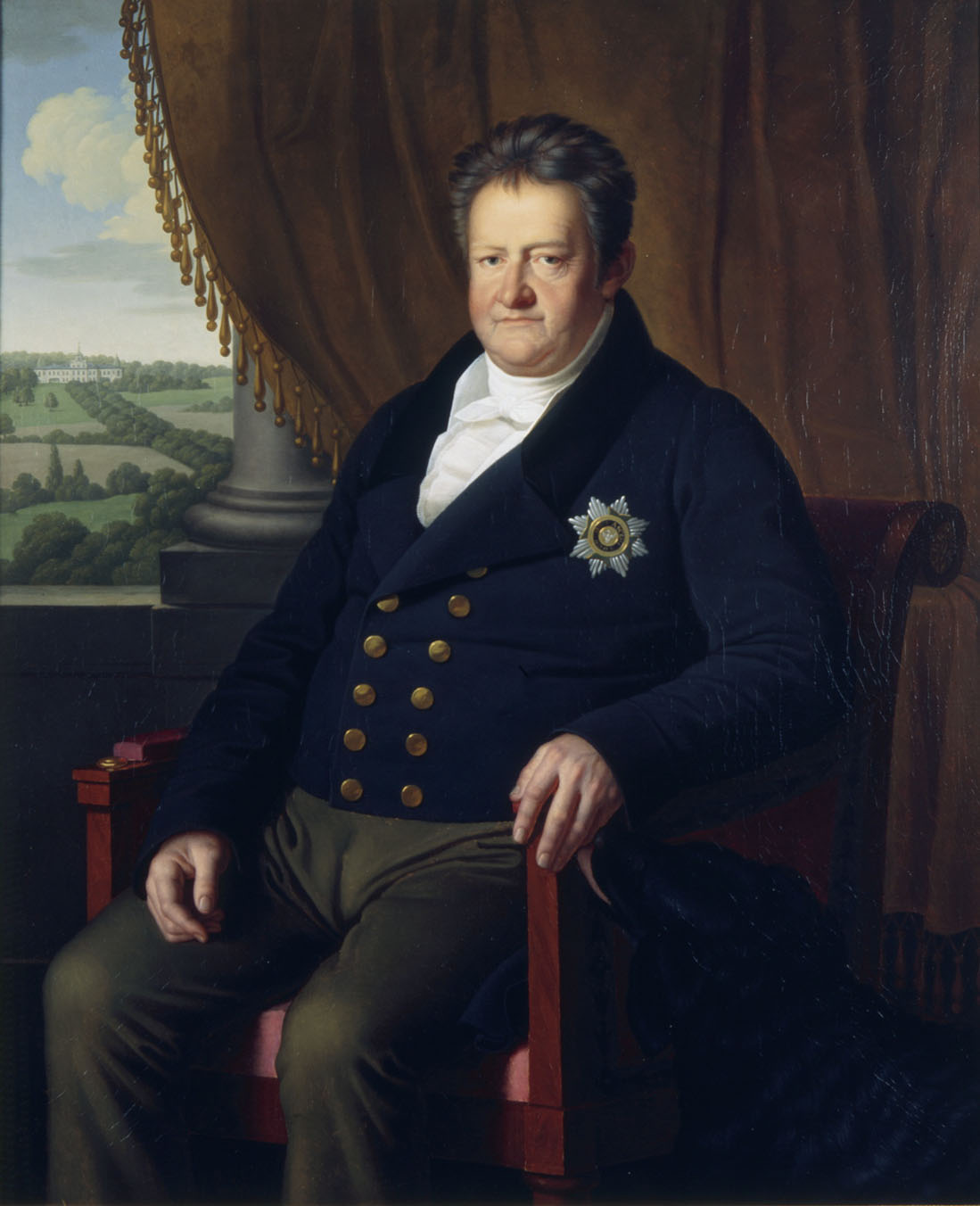
- Portrait by Heinrich Christoph Kolbe, 1822

Grand Duke of Saxe-Weimar-Eisenach
- Reign: 9 June 1815 – 14 June 1828
- Predecessor: Raised from duchy
- Successor: Charles Frederick

Duke of Saxe-Weimar-Eisenach
- Reign: 20 September 1809 – 9 June 1815
- Predecessor: New creation from personal union
- Successor: Raised to grand duchy

Duke of Saxe-Weimar
- Reign: 28 May 1758– 20 September 1809
- Predecessor: Ernest Augustus II
- Successor: Union with Saxe-Eisenach
- Regent: Dowager Duchess Anna Amalia

Duke of Saxe-Eisenach
- Reign: 28 May 1758– 20 September 1809
- Predecessor: Ernest Augustus II
- Successor: Union with Saxe-Weimar
- Regent: Dowager Duchess Anna Amalia
- Born: 3 September 1757; Weimar, Duchy of Saxe-Weimar, Holy Roman Empire (now in Thuringia, Germany)
- Died: 14 June 1828 (aged 70); Graditz, near Torgau, Province of Saxony, Kingdom of Prussia (now in Saxony, Germany)
- Spouse: Landgravine Louisa of Hesse-Darmstadt (m. 1775)
- Issue: Princess Luise; Charles Frederick, Grand Duke of Saxe-Weimar-Eisenach; Caroline Louise, Hereditary Grand Duchess of Mecklenburg-Schwerin; Prince Bernhard Illegitimate: Johann Karl Sebastian Klein; Karl Wilhelm von Knebel; Karl von Heygendorff; August von Heygendorff; Mariana von Heygendorff, Baroness of Tindal
- House: Saxe-Weimar-Eisenach
- Father: Ernest Augustus II, Duke of Saxe-Weimar and Saxe-Eisenach
- Mother: Duchess Anna Amalia of Brunswick-Wolfenbüttel

Karl August, sometimes anglicised as Charles Augustus (3 September 1757 – 14 June 1828), was the sovereign Duke of Saxe-Weimar and of Saxe-Eisenach (in personal union) from 1758, Duke of Saxe-Weimar-Eisenach from its creation (as a political union) in 1809, and grand duke from 1815 until his death. He is noted for the intellectual brilliance of his court.

== Biography ==
Born in Weimar, he was the eldest son of Ernst August II, Duke of Saxe-Weimar and Saxe-Eisenach (Ernest Augustus II), and Duchess Anna Amalia of Brunswick-Wolfenbüttel.

His father died when he was only nine months old (28 May 1758), and the boy was brought up under the regency and supervision of his mother. His governor was the Count Johann Eustach von Görtz and in 1771, Christoph Martin Wieland was appointed his tutor. In 1774 the poet Karl Ludwig von Knebel came to Weimar as tutor to his brother, the young Prince Frederick Ferdinand Constantin, and in the same year the two princes set out, with Count Görtz and Knebel, for Paris. At Frankfurt, Knebel introduced Karl August to the young Johann Wolfgang von Goethe.

In Karlsruhe on 3 October 1775, after he returned to Weimar and assumed the government of his duchy, Karl August married Luise Auguste, daughter of Louis IX, Landgrave of Hesse-Darmstadt.

One of the first acts of the young duke was to summon Goethe to Weimar, and in 1776 he was made a member of the privy council. "People of discernment," the duke said, "congratulate me on possessing this man. His intellect, his genius is known. It makes no difference if the world is offended because I have made Dr. Goethe a member of my most important collegium without his having passed through the stages of minor official professor and councillor of state."

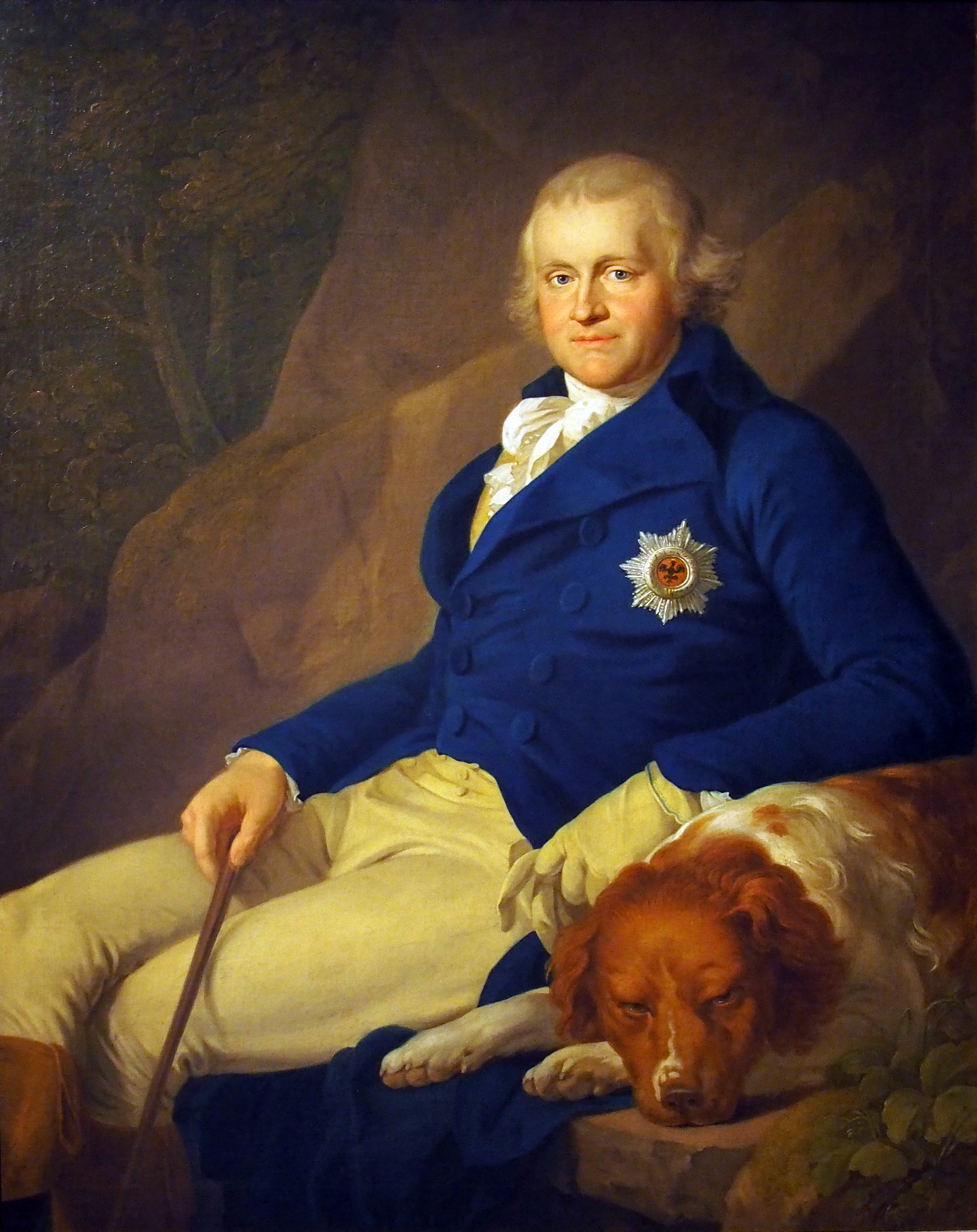
1805 portrait of Karl August, Duke of Saxe-Weimar.

The Weimaraner, a breed of gun dog is said to have been developed by August and his court for hunting. Karl August was also interested in literature, in art, in science, funding Goethe and the foundation of the Weimar Princely Free Drawing School and encouraging Weimar Classicism. Critics praised his judgment in painting; biologists found in him an expert in anatomy.

His aim was to educate his people to work out their own political and social salvation, the object of education being in his view, as he explained later to the dismay of Metternich and his school, to help men to independence of judgment. To this end Herder was summoned to Weimar to reform the educational system and the University of Jena attained the zenith of its fame under his rule. Weimar became the intellectual centre of Germany.

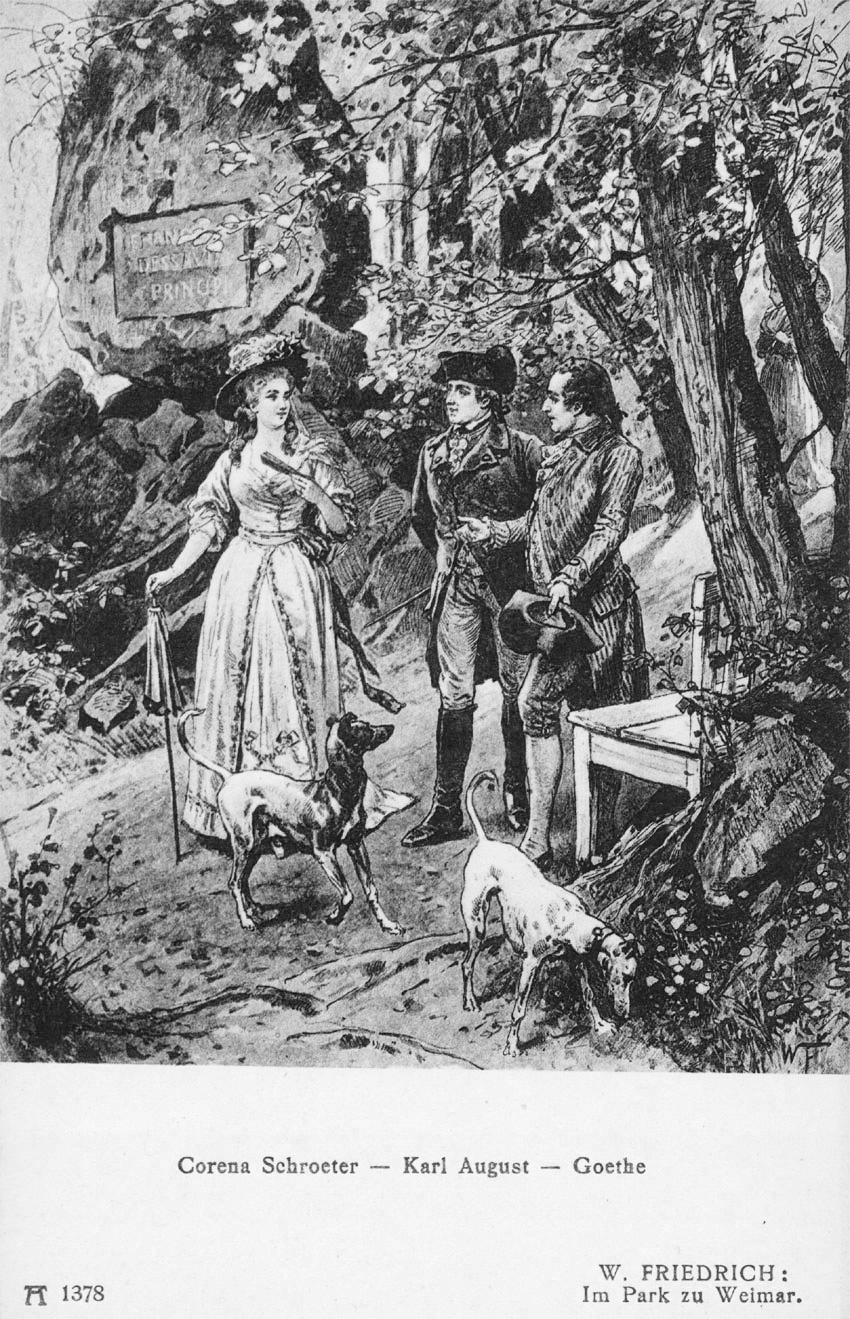
Engraving depicting Karl August walking with Corona Schröter and Johann Wolfgang von Goethe.

Meanwhile, in the affairs of Germany and of Europe the character of Karl August gave him an influence out of all proportion to his position as a sovereign prince. He had early faced the problem presented by the decay of the Holy Roman Empire, and began to work for the unity of Germany. The plans of Emperor Joseph II, which threatened to absorb a great part of Germany into the heterogeneous Habsburg monarchy, threw him into the arms of Prussia, and he was the prime mover in the establishment of the league of princes (Fürstenbund) in 1785, by which, under the leadership of Frederick the Great, Joseph's intrigues were frustrated. He was, however, under no illusion as to the power of Austria, and he refused the offer of the Hungarian crown. In 1788 Karl August took service in the Prussian army as major-general in active command of a regiment. As such he was present, with Goethe, at the Battle of Valmy in 1792, and in 1794 at the Siege of Mainz and the Battle of Pirmasenz (14 September) and Kaiserslautern (28–30 November). After this, dissatisfied with the attitude of the powers, he resigned, but rejoined on the accession of his friend King Frederick William III to the Prussian throne. The disastrous campaign of Jena (1806) followed. On 14 October, the day after the battle, Weimar was sacked, and Karl August, to prevent the confiscation of his territories, was forced to join the Confederation of the Rhine. From this time till after the Moscow campaign of 1812 his contingent fought on the French side in all Napoleon's wars. In 1813, however, he joined the Sixth Coalition, and at the beginning of 1814 took command of a corps of 30,000 men operating in the Netherlands.

At the Congress of Vienna (1815) Karl August was present in person and protested vainly against the narrow policy of the powers in confining their debates to the rights of the princes to the exclusion of the rights of the people. His services in the war of liberation were rewarded with an extension of territory and the title of grand duke (Großherzog), but his liberal attitude had already made him suspect, and his subsequent action brought him still further into confrontation with the reactionary powers. He was the first of the German princes to grant a liberal constitution to his state under Article XIII of the Act of Confederation (5 May 1816) and his concession of liberty to the press made Weimar for a while the focus of journalistic agitation against the existing order. Metternich dubbed him contemptuously der grosse Bursche for his patronage of the revolutionary Burschenschaften, and the celebrated festival held at the Wartburg by his permission in 1817, though in effect the mildest of political demonstrations, brought down upon him the wrath of the great powers. The grand duke was compelled to yield to the remonstrances of Prussia, Austria and Russia. The liberty of the press was again restricted in the grand duchy, but, thanks to the good understanding between the grand duke and his people, the regime of the Carlsbad Decrees pressed less heavily upon Weimar than upon other German states.

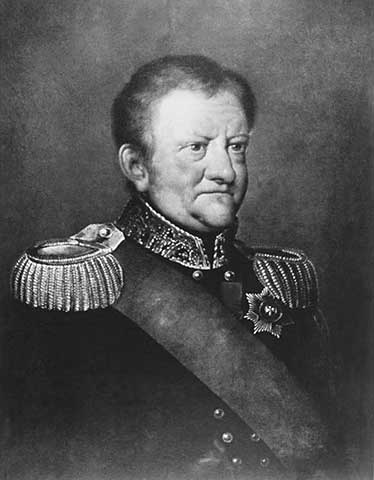
Karl August as Grand Duke of Saxe-Weimar-Eisenach.

Karl August died at Graditz, near Torgau, in 1828. Karl von Dalberg, the prince-primate, who owed the co-adjutorship of Mainz to the duke's friendship, said that he had never met a prince with so much understanding, character, frankness and true-heartedness; the Milanese, when he visited their city, called him the uomo principe, and Goethe himself said of him that "he had the gift of discriminating intellects and characters and setting each one in his place. He was inspired by the noblest good-will, the purest humanity, and with his whole soul desired only what was best. There was in him something of the divine. He would gladly have wrought the happiness of all mankind. And finally, he was greater than his surroundings. ... Everywhere he himself saw and judged, and in all circumstances his surest foundation was in himself." Karl August's correspondence with Goethe was published in 2 volumes at Weimar in 1863.

He left two surviving sons: Karl Frederick, by whom he was succeeded, and Karl Bernhard, a soldier, who, after the Congress of Vienna, became colonel of a regiment in the service of the King of the Netherlands, served as commander of the Dutch troops in the Belgian campaign of 1830 (the Ten Days' Campaign), and from 1847 to 1850 held the command of the forces in the Dutch East Indies. Bernhard's son, William Augustus Edward, known as Prince Edward of Saxe-Weimar (1823–1902), entered the British army and ended his career as a field marshal.

Karl August's only surviving daughter, Caroline Louise, married Frederick Ludwig, Hereditary Grand Duke of Mecklenburg-Schwerin, and was the mother of Helene (1814–1858), wife of Ferdinand Philippe, Duke of Orléans, eldest son of Louis Philippe I, King of France.

== Ancestry ==
Ancestors of Karl August, Grand Duke of Saxe-Weimar-Eisenach

8. John Ernest III, Duke of Saxe-Weimar
4. Ernest Augustus I, Duke of Saxe-Weimar-Eisenach
9. Princess Sophie Auguste of Anhalt-Zerbst
2. Ernest Augustus II, Duke of Saxe-Weimar-Eisenach
10. George Frederick Charles, Margrave of Brandenburg-Bayreuth
5. Princess Sophie Charlotte of Brandenburg-Bayreuth
11. Princess Dorothea of Schleswig-Holstein-Sonderburg-Beck
1. Charles Augustus, Grand Duke of Saxe-Weimar-Eisenach
12. Ferdinand Albert II, Duke of Brunswick-Wolfenbüttel
6. Charles I, Duke of Brunswick-Wolfenbüttel
13. Duchess Antoinette of Brunswick-Wolfenbüttel
3. Duchess Anna Amalia of Brunswick-Wolfenbüttel
14. Frederick William I of Prussia
7. Princess Philippine Charlotte of Prussia
15. Princess Sophia Dorothea of Hanover

== Children ==
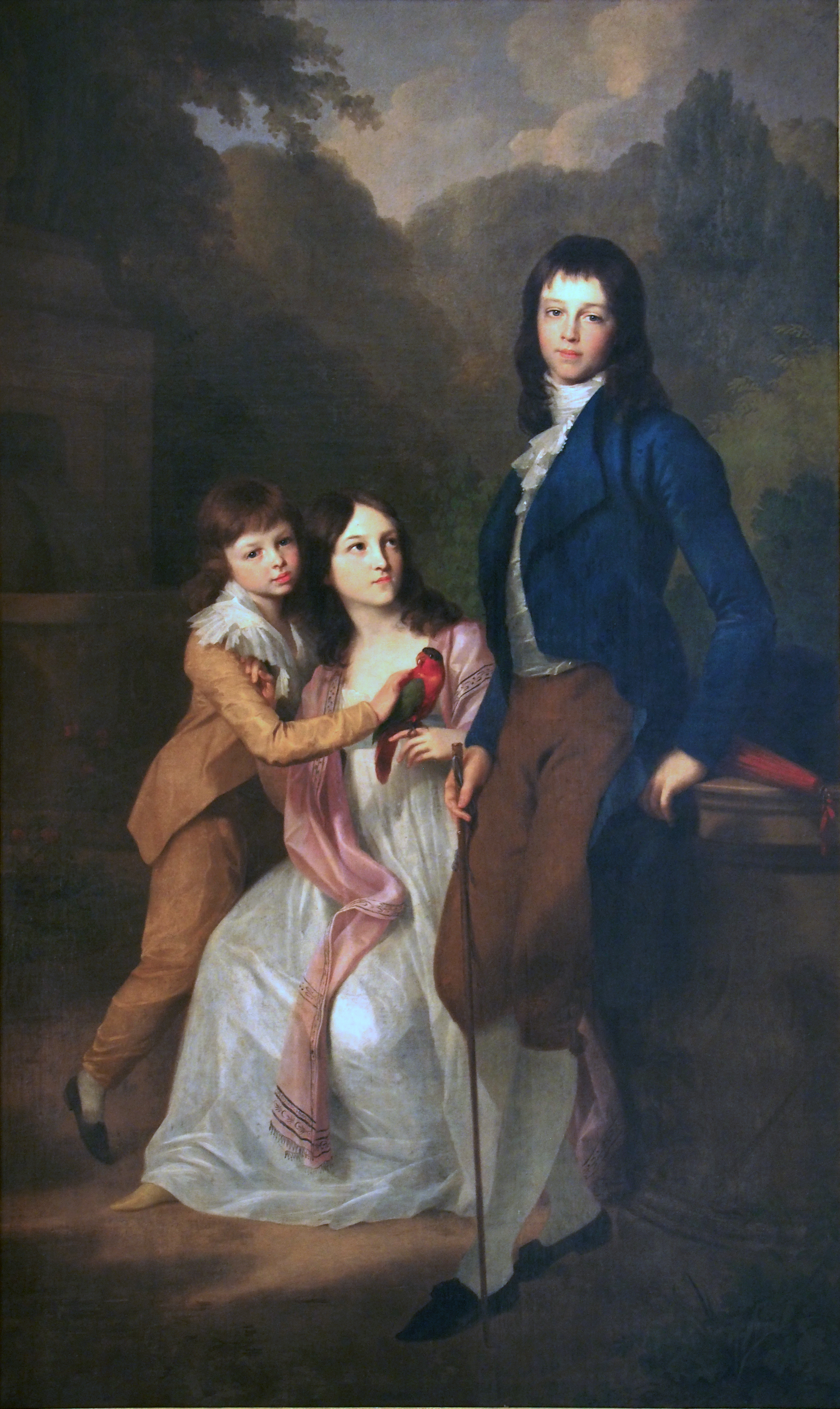
The children of Karl August and Luise Auguste's: Charles Frederick, Caroline Louise and Bernhard. Portrait by Johann Friedrich August Tischbein, 1798.

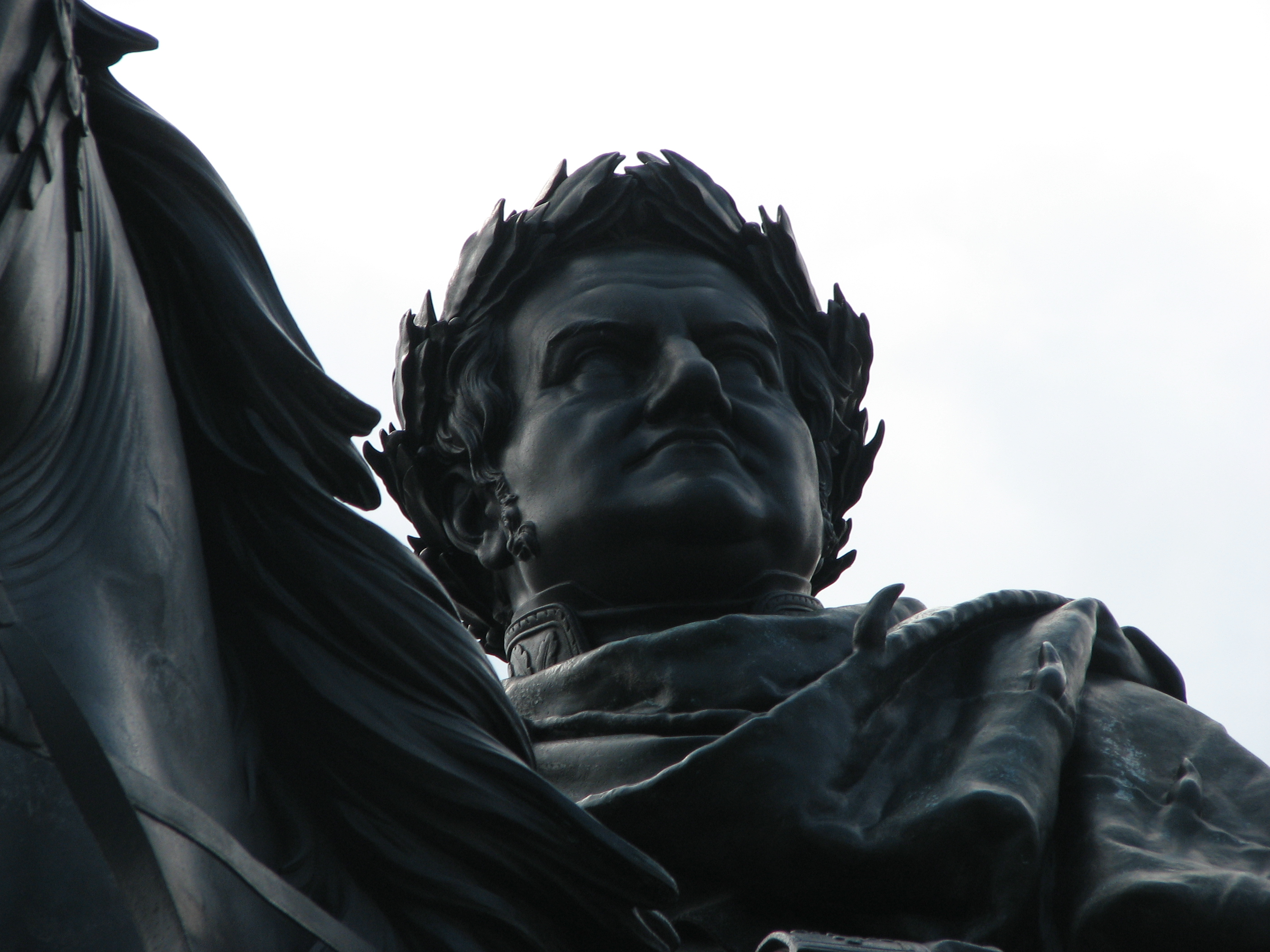
Statue of Karl August in Weimar.

Karl August and Luise Auguste had seven children:

1. Luise Auguste Amalie (b. Weimar, 3 February 1779 – d. Weimar, 24 March 1784).
2. a daughter (b. and d. Weimar, 10 September 1781).
3. Charles Frederick, Grand Duke of Saxe-Weimar-Eisenach (b. Weimar, 2 February 1783 – d. Schloss Belvedere, near Weimar, 8 July 1853).
4. a son (b. and d. Weimar, 26 February 1785).
5. Caroline Louise (b. Weimar, 18 July 1786 – d. Ludwigslust, 20 January 1816), married on 1 July 1810 to Frederick Louis, Hereditary Grand Duke of Mecklenburg-Schwerin.
6. a son (b. and d. Weimar, 13 April 1789).
7. Karl Bernhard (b. Weimar, 30 May 1792 – d. Liebenstein, 31 July 1862).

In addition, Karl August acknowledged five children by him born out of wedlock:

- With Eva Dorothea Wiegand (b. 1755 – d. 1828)
  1. Johann Karl Sebastian Klein (b. Stützerbach, 9 June 1779 – d. Weimar, 28 June 1830), married on 22 April 1817 to Anna Fredericka Henriette Müller. They had three sons who possibly died young.
- With Luise Rudorf (b. 1777 – d. 1852)
  1. Karl Wilhelm von Knebel (b. Templin, 18 January 1796 – d. Jena, 16 November 1861), married firstly on 6 February 1825 to Fredericka von Geusau, with whom he had one son, who died in infancy, before they divorced in 1837; secondly he married on 14 May 1839 Josephine Karoline Emilie Trautmann, with whom he had one son and two daughters.
- With Karoline Jagemann (b. 1777 – d. 1848), created Frau von Heygendorff
  1. Karl Wolfgang von Heygendorff (b. Weimar, 25 December 1806 – d. Dresden, 17 February 1895)
  2. August von Heygendorff (b. Weimar, 10 August 1810 – d. Dresden, 23 January 1874).
  3. Mariana von Heygendorff (b. Weimar, 8 April 1812 – d. The Hague, 10 August 1836), married on 15 October 1835 to Daniel, Baron Tindal.

== Notes ==
Karl August, Grand Duke of Saxe-Weimar-Eisenach House of Saxe-Weimar-Eisenach Cadet branch of the House of Wettin Born: 3 September 1757 Died: 14 June 1828
Regnal titles
Preceded by Ernest Augustus II	Duke of Saxe-Weimar; 1758–1809 with Dowager Duchess Anna Amalia (1758–75)	United to form Duchy of Saxe-Weimar-Eisenach
Preceded by Ernest Augustus II	Duke of Saxe-Eisenach; 1758–1809 with Dowager Duchess Anna Amalia (1758–75)	United to form Duchy of Saxe-Weimar-Eisenach
New title Previously a personal union of Saxe-Weimar and Saxe-Eisenach	Duke of Saxe-Weimar-Eisenach; 1809–1815	Raised to Grand Duke
New title Raised from Duke	Grand Duke of Saxe-Weimar-Eisenach; 1815–1828	Succeeded by Karl Frederick
