= Karoline Jagemann =

German opera singer (1777–1848)

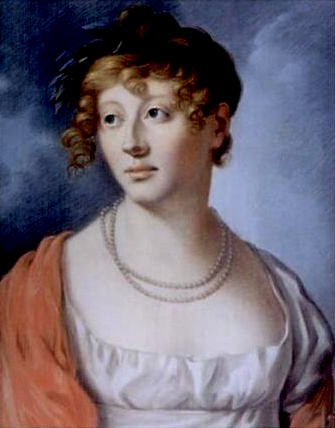
Karoline Jagemann as Ion, by Jakob Wilhelm Christian Roux (1803)

Baroness Karoline Jagemann von Heygendorff (25 January 1777 in Weimar – 10 July 1848 in Dresden) was a major German tragedienne and singer. Her great roles included Elizabeth in Mary Stuart (1800) and Beatrice in The Bride of Messina (1803). She is also notable as a mistress of Karl August, Grand Duke of Saxe-Weimar-Eisenach, the father of her three children. Both she and Karl August had their portraits painted by Heinrich Christoph Kolbe.

== Life ==
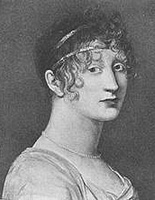
Portrait of Karoline by her brother Ferdinand

Henriette Karoline Friedericke Jagemann was the daughter of the scholar and librarian Christian Joseph Jagemann (1735–1804), and sister of the painter Ferdinand Jagemann (1780–1820). She studied first at the Weimar Princely Free Zeichenschule, where her brother was later a lecturer. From 1790 she trained in acting and singing in Mannheim under August Iffland and Heinrich Beck.

She made her debut in 1792 in the title role of the opera Oberon – The Fairy King by Paul Wranitzky at Mannheim's Nationaltheater and was engaged as a court-singer in Weimar in 1797. She and the soprano Henriette Eberwein (1790 - 1849), the tenor Carl Melchior Jakob Moltke, and the bass Karl Stromeier collectively made up the "Weimar Quartet". She was guest-singer in 1798 at Berlin, in 1800 at Vienna, and later in Stuttgart, Frankfurt am Main and Leipzig.

In 1809 her lover, Grand Duke Karl August, made her "Freifrau (Baroness) von Heygendorff" and left her Heygendorf manor. Witnessed by the Grand Duke, their son Karl was officially granted the Heygendorff title on 16 May 1809 and he and his children entered the Saxon grand-ducal nobility.

In the same year Karoline von Heygendorff was made director of the opera and – after Goethe's retirement from theatre – took over as sole director of the court theatre, from 1824 as Oberdirektor. After Karl August's death in 1828, Karoline retired from the stage and lived out her last years with her son in Dresden.

== Issue with Karl August ==
1. Karl Wolfgang Freiherr von Heygendorff (Weimar, 25 December 1806 – Dresden, 17 February 1895)
2. August von Heygendorff (Weimar, 10 August 1810 – Dresden, 23 January 1874)
3. Mariana von Heygendorff (Weimar, 8 April 1812 – 's Gravenhage, 10 August 1836), married on 15 October 1835 to Daniel, Baron Tindal

== Bibliography ==
- Karoline Jagemann in the Allgemeine Deutsche Biographie (Wikisource)
- Hans Wahl, Anton Kippenberg, Goethe und seine Welt, Insel-Verlag, Leipzig 1932
