= Duchess Anna Amalia of Brunswick-Wolfenbüttel =

German princess and composer (1739–1807)

Duchess Anna Amalie
- Duchess of Saxe-Weimar-Eisenach
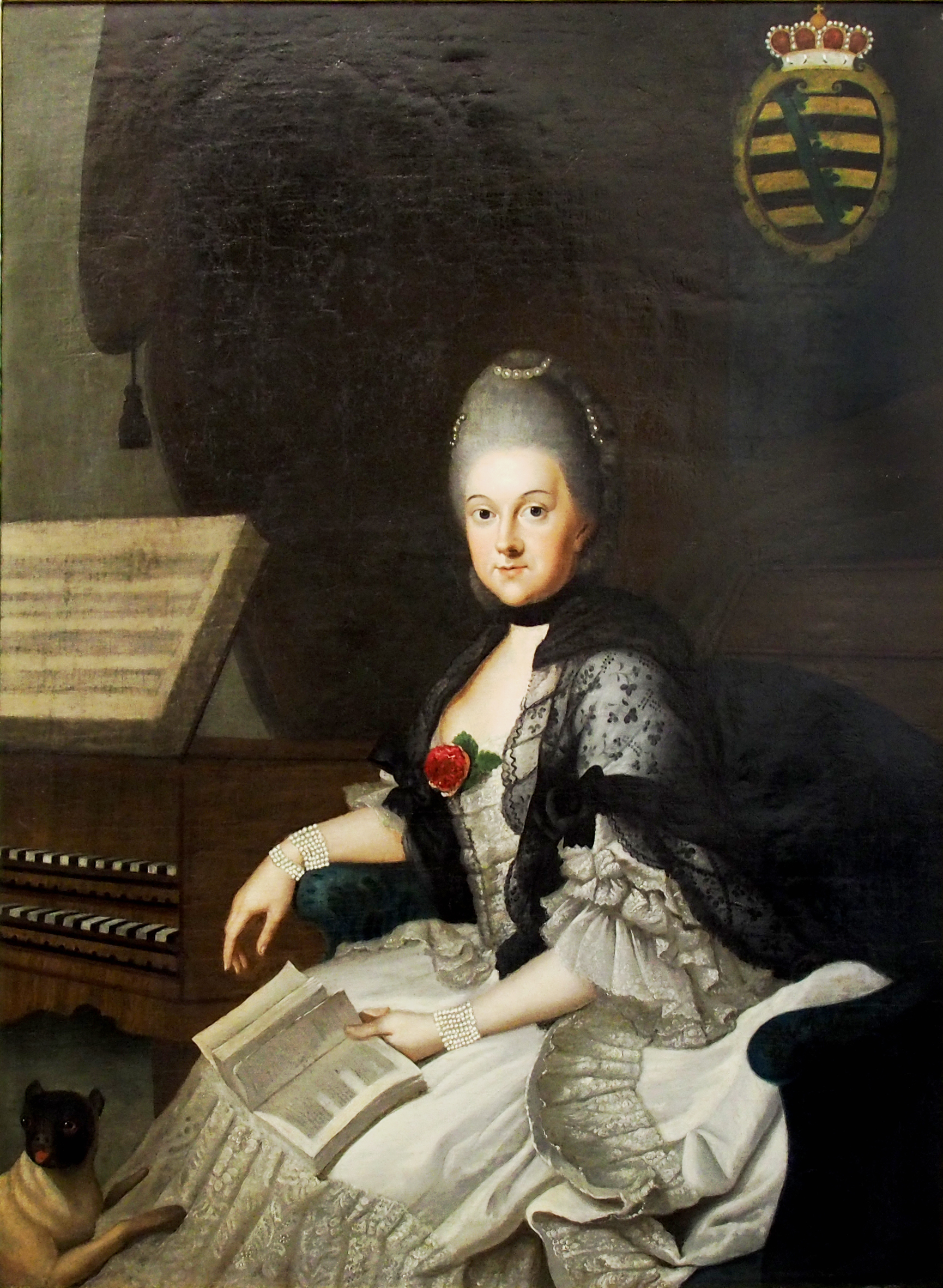
- Portrait by Johann Ernst Heinsius (1769)

Duchess consort of Saxe-Weimar and Saxe-Eisenach
- Tenure: 16 March 1756 – 28 May 1758

Regent of Saxe-Weimar and Saxe-Eisenach
- Regency: 1758–1775
- Born: 24 October 1739; Schloss Wolfenbüttel, Wolfenbüttel
- Died: 10 April 1807 (aged 67); Wittumspalais, Weimar
- Burial: City church of Weimar
- Spouse: Ernest Augustus II, Duke of Saxe-Weimar-Eisenach (m. 1756; died 1758)
- Issue: Karl August, Grand Duke of Saxe-Weimar-Eisenach; Prince Frederick Ferdinand Constantin
- House: Brunswick-Bevern; Saxe-Weimar-Eisenach
- Father: Charles I, Duke of Brunswick-Wolfenbüttel
- Mother: Princess Philippine Charlotte of Prussia

Anna Amalie of Brunswick-Wolfenbüttel (24 October 1739 – 10 April 1807), was a German princess and composer.

She became the duchess of Saxe-Weimar-Eisenach by marriage, and was also regent of the states of Saxe-Weimar and Saxe-Eisenach from 1758 to 1775. She transformed her court and its surrounding into the most influential cultural center of Germany. Her invitation of Abel Seyler's theatre company in 1771 marked the start of Weimar Classicism, that would include such figures such as Wieland, Goethe, Herder and Schiller working under her protection.

== Family ==
Duchess Anna Amalias's standard

She was born in Schloss Wolfenbüttel in Wolfenbüttel, the fifth child of thirteen of Karl I, Duke of Brunswick-Wolfenbüttel and Princess Philippine Charlotte of Prussia. Her maternal grandparents were Frederick William I of Prussia and Sophia Dorothea of Hanover. Her niece was Queen Caroline, wife of King George IV.

== Education ==
Anna Amalia was well-educated as befitted a princess. She received an education befitting a princess of the high nobility, primarily from the theologians Johann Friedrich Wilhelm Jerusalem and Matthias Theodor Christoph Mittelstädt. Religious instruction was the most important part of her education and was taught in both German and French. Anna Amalia's upbringing followed the Protestant traditions of the House of Brunswick but also incorporated 'rational' principles of knowledge and confessionally reconciling ideas. She was also taught the history of states, rulers and the imperial constitution, geography and the fine arts, and learned to dance and play the piano.

She studied music with Friedrich Gottlob Fleischer and Ernst Wilhelm Wolf. Also her mother Princess Philippine Charlotte was a composer.

== Marriage and issue ==
In Brunswick, on 16 March 1756, sixteen-year-old Anna Amalia married eighteen-year-old Ernst August II Konstantin, Duke of Saxe-Weimar-Eisenach and they had two sons. The 20-year-old spouse Ernst August died on 28 May 1758 leaving her regent for their infant nine months old son, Karl August. She was pregnant with their other son Prince Constantine, born three months after the father's death.

The boy was brought up under the regency and supervision of his mother, a woman of enlightened but masterful temperament. His governor was Count Eustach von Görz, a German nobleman of the old strait-laced school; but a more humane element was introduced into his training when, in 1771, Christoph Martin Wieland was appointed his tutor. In 1774 the poet Karl Ludwig von Knebel came to Weimar as tutor to the young Prince Constantine.

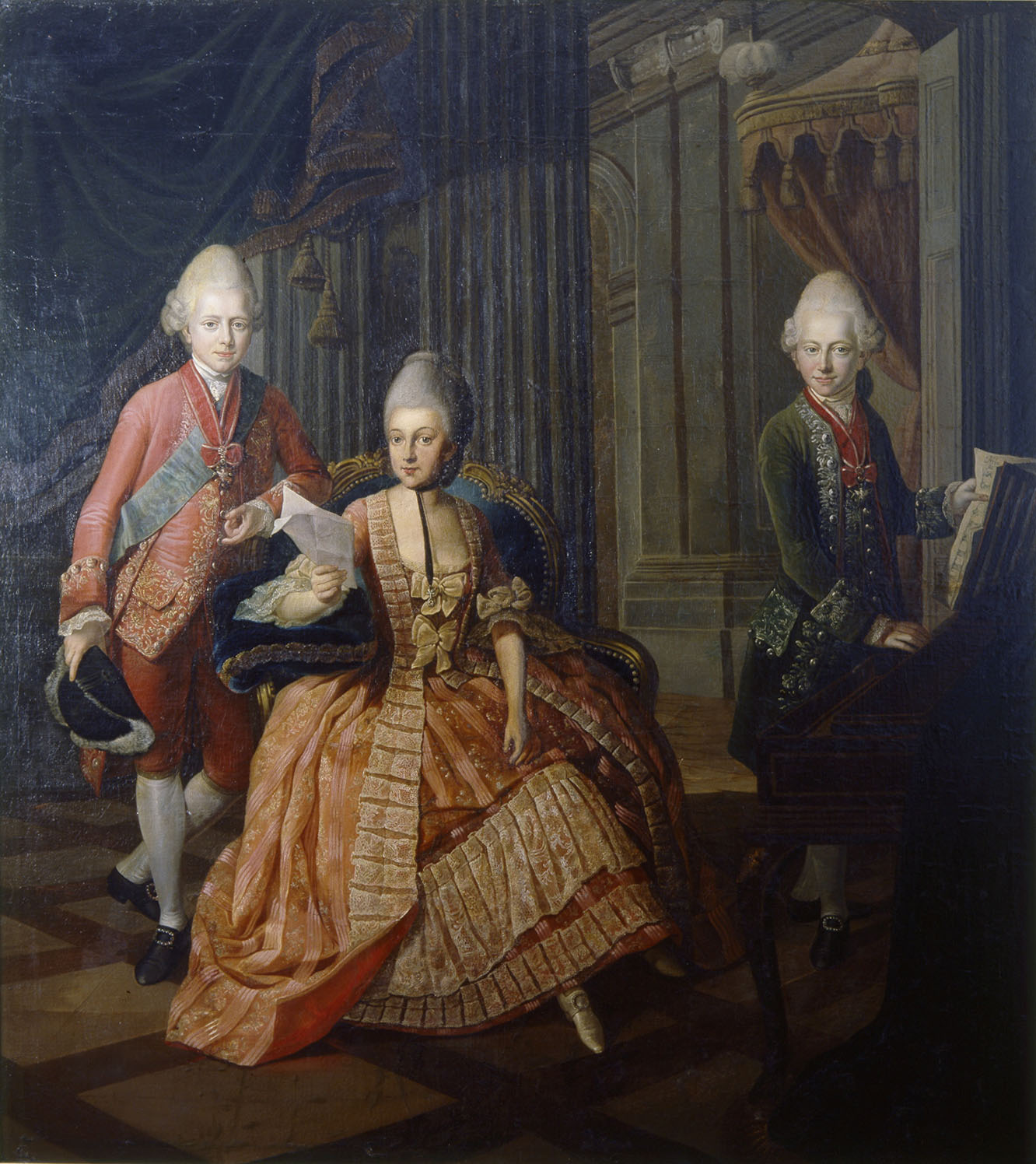
Duchess Anna Amalia with her sons Karl August and Constantin, by Anna Rosina de Gasc, 1773-1774

== Regency ==
During Karl August's minority she administered the affairs of the duchy with notable prudence, strengthening its resources and improving its position in spite of the troubles of the Seven Years' War. Despite her heavy official responsibilities, she cultivated intellectual interests, especially music. She continued to take lessons in composition and keyboard playing from the leading musician in Weimar. Amalia von Helvig, a German-Swedish artist and writer, later became part of her court. She hired Christoph Martin Wieland, a poet and translator of William Shakespeare, to educate her sons. On 3 September 1775, her son reached his majority, and she retired.

Anna Amalia died on 10 April 1807 after a short illness in the Wittum palace in Weimar. Goethe himself wrote an obituary on her death. At her own request, she was buried in the city church of Weimar. Unlike previous dukes, she was not transferred to the Princely Crypt commissioned by her son, Karl August, which was completed in 1828.

== Cultural role ==
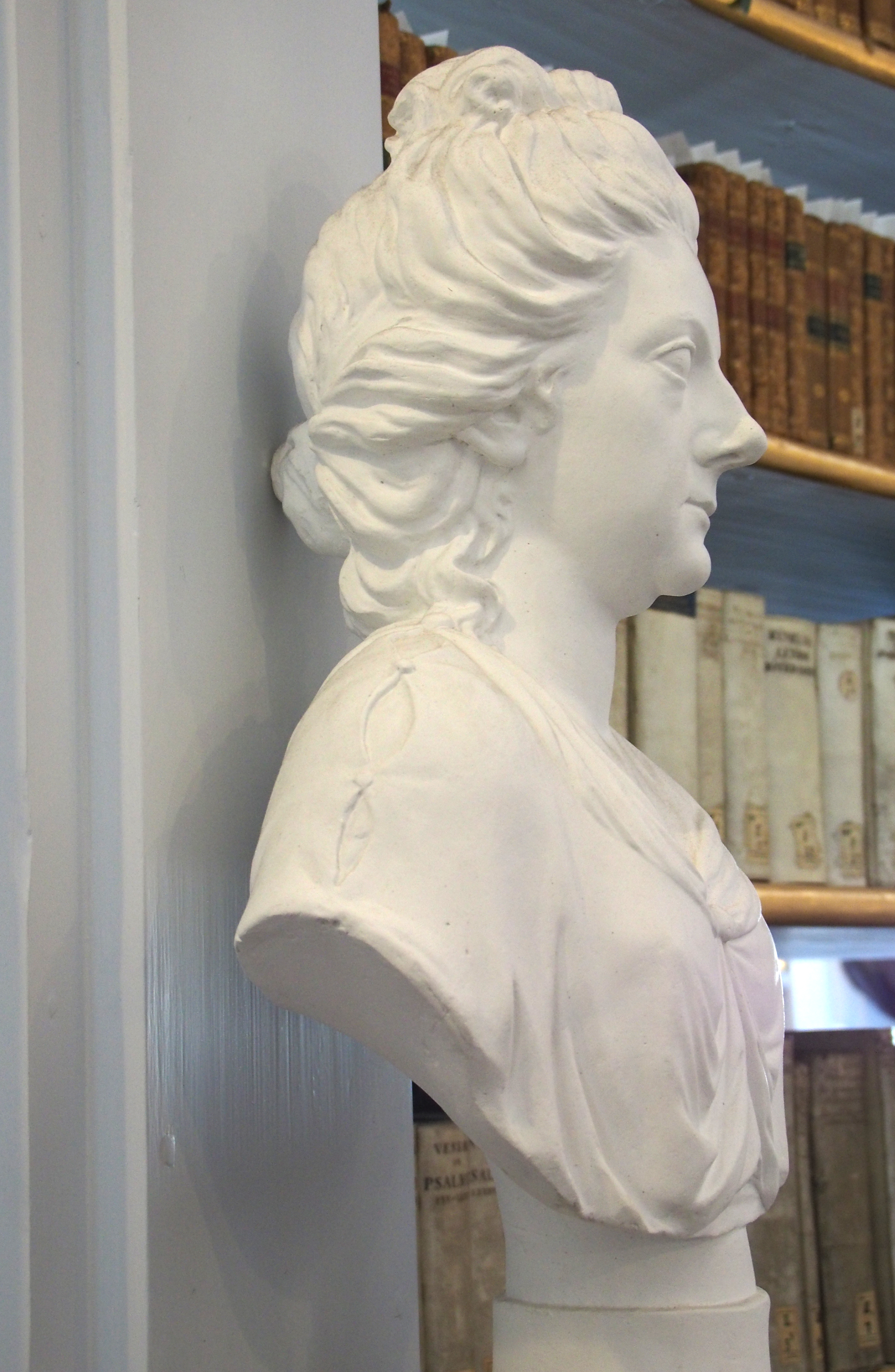
Bust of the Duchess in the Duchess Anna Amalia Library by Martin Gottlieb Klauer (1780)

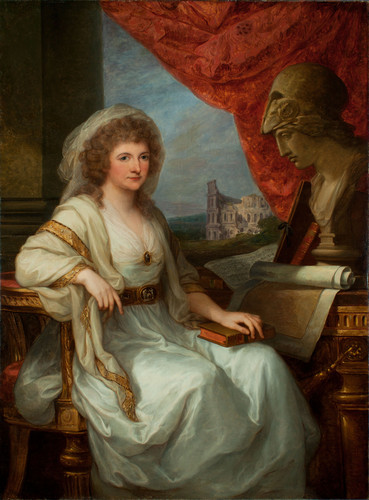
Duchess Anna Amalia, by Angelica Kauffmann in 1788/1789

As a patron of the arts, Anna Amalia drew many of the most eminent people in Germany to Weimar. She gathered a group of scholars, poets and musicians, professional and amateur, for lively discussion and music-making at the Wittum palace. In this ‘court of the muses’, as Wilhelm von Bode called it, the members included Johann Gottfried Herder, Johann Wolfgang von Goethe, and Friedrich Schiller. She succeeded in engaging Abel Seyler's theatrical company, considered the best theatre company in Germany at that time."

Anna Amalia herself played a significant part in bringing together the poetry of 'Weimar Classicism'. Johann Adam Hiller's most successful Singspiel, Die Jagd (the score of which is dedicated to the duchess), received its first performance in Weimar in 1770, and Weimar was also the scene of the notable première on 28 May 1773 of the ‘first German opera’, Wieland's Alceste in the setting by Anton Schweitzer. Anna Amalia continued the tradition of the Singspiel in later years with performances in the amateur court theatre of her own compositions to texts by Goethe.

She also established the Duchess Anna Amalia Library, which is now home to some 1,000,000 volumes. The duchess was honored in Goethe's work under the title Zum Andenken der Fürstin Anna-Amalia.

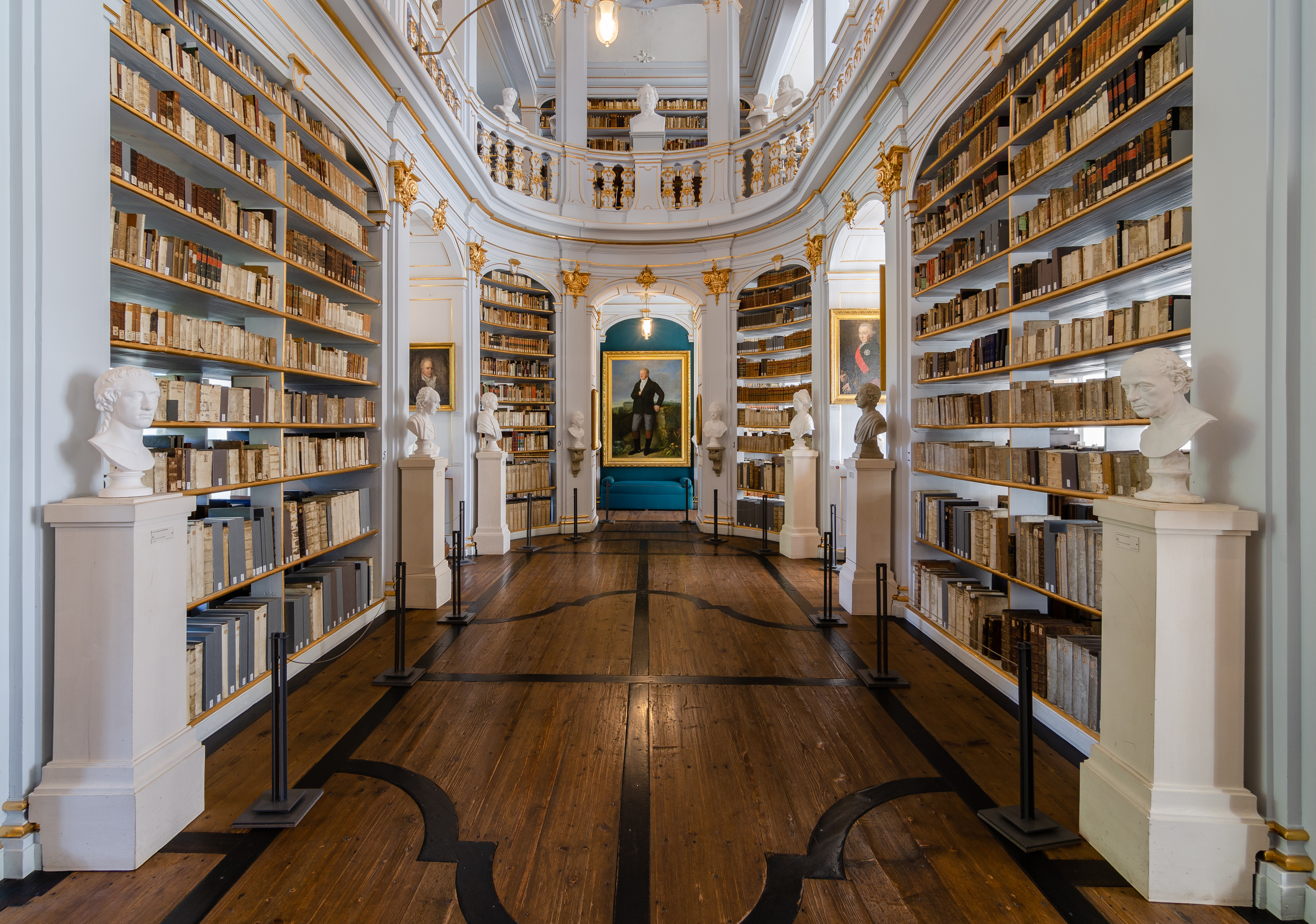
Herzogin Anna Amalia Bibliothek library in Weimar, in the end of the room is a portrait of J. W. Goethe

The Duchess contrasted Goethe and Schiller's concept of classicism with the sociable ideal of "sensual" education—her primary goal was to expand her abilities, enjoy aesthetic impressions, and be entertained. Significantly, the "Friday Society" initiated by Goethe, featuring scholarly lectures, only took place for about half a year (Autumn 1791/Spring 1792) in the Duchess's city palace before "moving" to Goethe's residence on Frauenplan. Anna Amalia withdrew to her own court, which she and her favorites stylized as a refuge for the muses, where they could indulge in art without worry, far from the political turmoil and wars of the 1790s and 1800s. In the summer, she gathered her fellow intellectuals around her at Ettersburg Castle. Anna Amalia's personal interests varied: she took drawing lessons from Georg Melchior Kraus, learned English, Italian and Greek and wrote some small literary manuscripts.

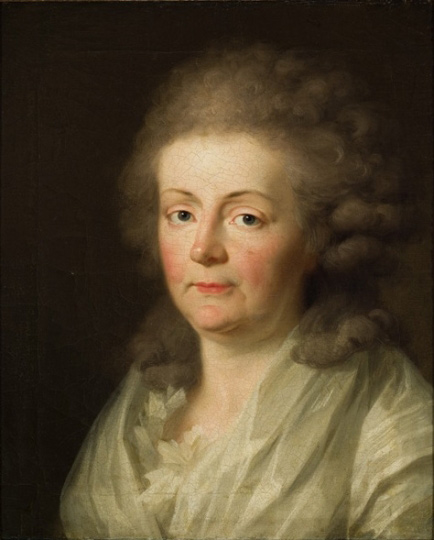
Duchess Anna Amalia of Saxe-Weimar-Eisenach, by Johann Friedrich August Tischbein in 1795

The most important arts for Anna Amalia's personal love of art and the sociability of her court were music and musical theater. The Duchess regretted that Weimar was relatively isolated in this regard compared to the artistic centers of the Empire. She tried to make up for this lack of personal experience, especially in Italy. She spent the years 1788 to 1790 in Rome (in the Villa Malta, Pincio hill) and Naples, which was very unusual for a widowed Protestant princess. There, Anna Amalia enjoyed nature, the arts and sights, ran a musical academy (salon) and enjoyed a secret friendship with the Archbishop of Taranto. Goethe and Johann Friedrich Reiffenstein had organized her travel program and accommodations from Rome. Around 1790, she is said to have brought the Spanish guitar, known as the "Italian guitar", to Germany.

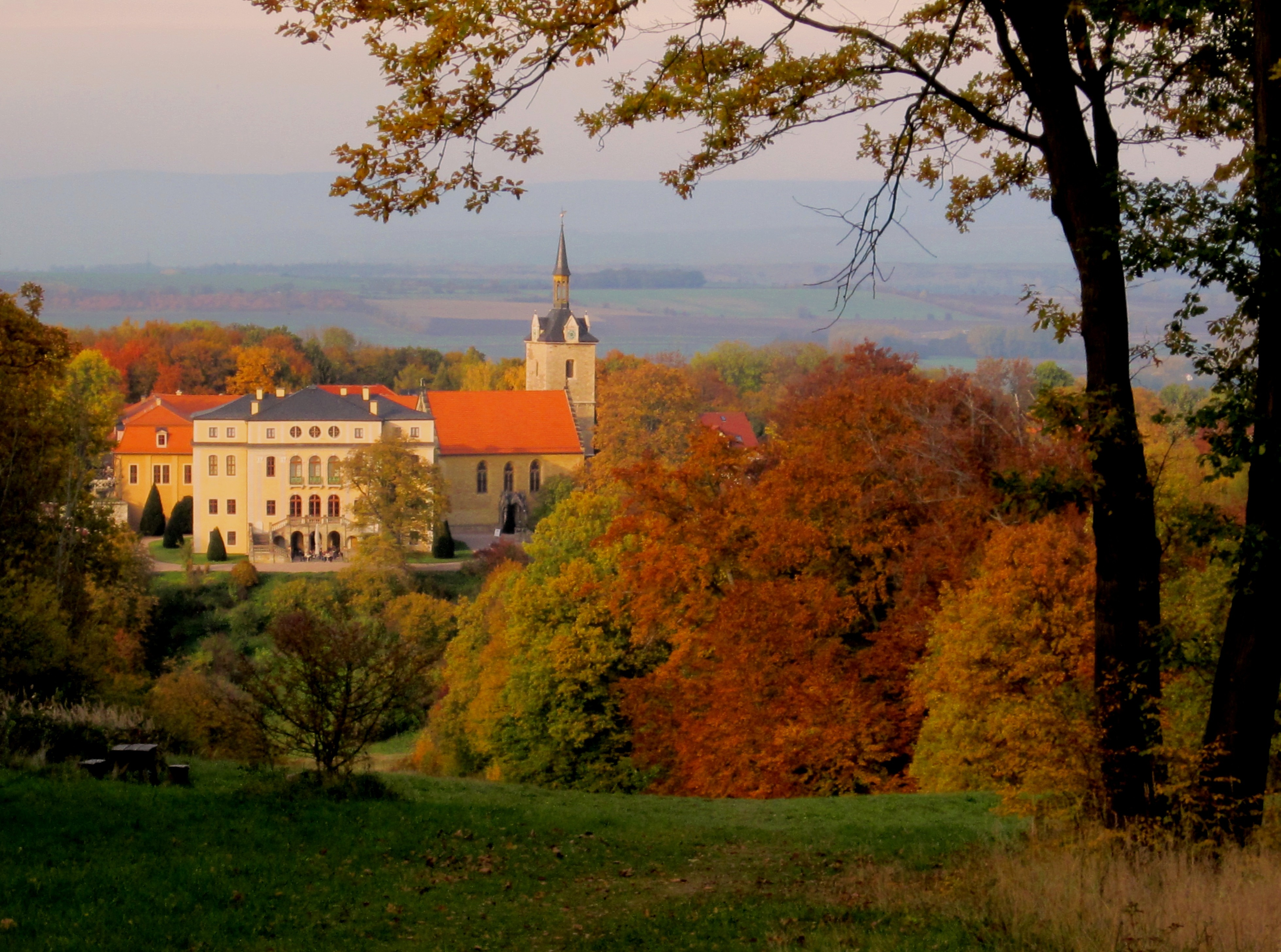
Ettersburg Castle and park

Anna Amalia lacked the financial means for extensive philanthropic ambitions, as an analysis of her treasury accounts showed. Anna Amalia was 'enlightened' in that she always aimed for external impact, where she appeared informed and up-to-date – to a broad, even non-courtly, audience. As open as she was to new ideas, she remained true to the dynastic mentality in which she had been raised. Even though she was not required to observe any ceremony at her widow's court, she always observed etiquette and proper behavior. Even if court norms sometimes seemed too restrictive to her, she nevertheless mastered the court system of granting and withdrawing favors. She guided her younger son Constantin, who wanted to marry first a German noblewoman and then a French commoner, into the more appropriate paths of social standing.

== Music ==
Anna Amalia was a notable composer. The majority of her works belong stylistically to the Empfindsamkeit, in the manner of Hiller and Schweitzer, combining features of song and of arioso. In 2021–2023, further works of Anna Amalia were discovered by the academic Stephen Husarik in the collection of Archduke Rudolf of Austria.

Her compositions include:

=== Chamber ===
- Divertimento (clarinet, viola, violoncello, and piano) c. 1780

=== Harpsichord ===
- sonatas

=== Opera ===
- Das Jahrmarktsfest zu Plundersweilern (text by Goethe)
- Erwin und Elmire (text by Goethe) 1776

=== Orchestra ===
- Oratorio (1768)
- Sacred Choruses (four voices and orchestra)
- Symphony (2 oboes, 2 flutes, 2 violins and double bass) 1765

=== Vocal ===
- songs

== Ancestry ==
Ancestors of Duchess Anna Amalia of Brunswick-Wolfenbüttel

8. Ferdinand Albert I, Duke of Brunswick-Wolfenbüttel-Bevern
4. Ferdinand Albert II, Duke of Brunswick-Wolfenbüttel
9. Princess Christine of Hesse-Eschwege
2. Charles I, Duke of Brunswick-Wolfenbüttel
10. Louis Rudolph, Duke of Brunswick-Wolfenbüttel
5. Duchess Antoinette of Brunswick-Wolfenbüttel
11. Princess Christine Louise of Oettingen-Oettingen
1. Duchess Anna Amalia of Brunswick-Wolfenbüttel
12. Frederick I of Prussia
6. Frederick William I of Prussia
13. Princess Sophia Charlotte of Hanover
3. Princess Philippine Charlotte of Prussia
14. George I of Great Britain
7. Princess Sophia Dorothea of Hanover
15. Princess Sophia Dorothea of Celle

Duchess Anna Amalia of Brunswick-Wolfenbüttel House of Brunswick-Bevern Cadet branch of the House of Welf Born: 24 October 1739 Died: 10 April 1807
German royalty
Vacant Title last held by Sophie Charlotte of Brandenburg-Bayreuth	Duchess consort of Saxe-Weimar; 16 March 1756 – 28 May 1758	Vacant Title next held by Louise of Hesse-Darmstadt
Vacant Title last held by Sophie Charlotte of Brandenburg-Bayreuth	Duchess consort of Saxe-Eisenach; 16 March 1756 – 28 May 1758	Vacant Title next held by Louise of Hesse-Darmstadt
