= Princess Auguste of Hesse-Homburg =

Landgravine Auguste
- Hereditary Grand Duchess of Mecklenburg-Schwerin
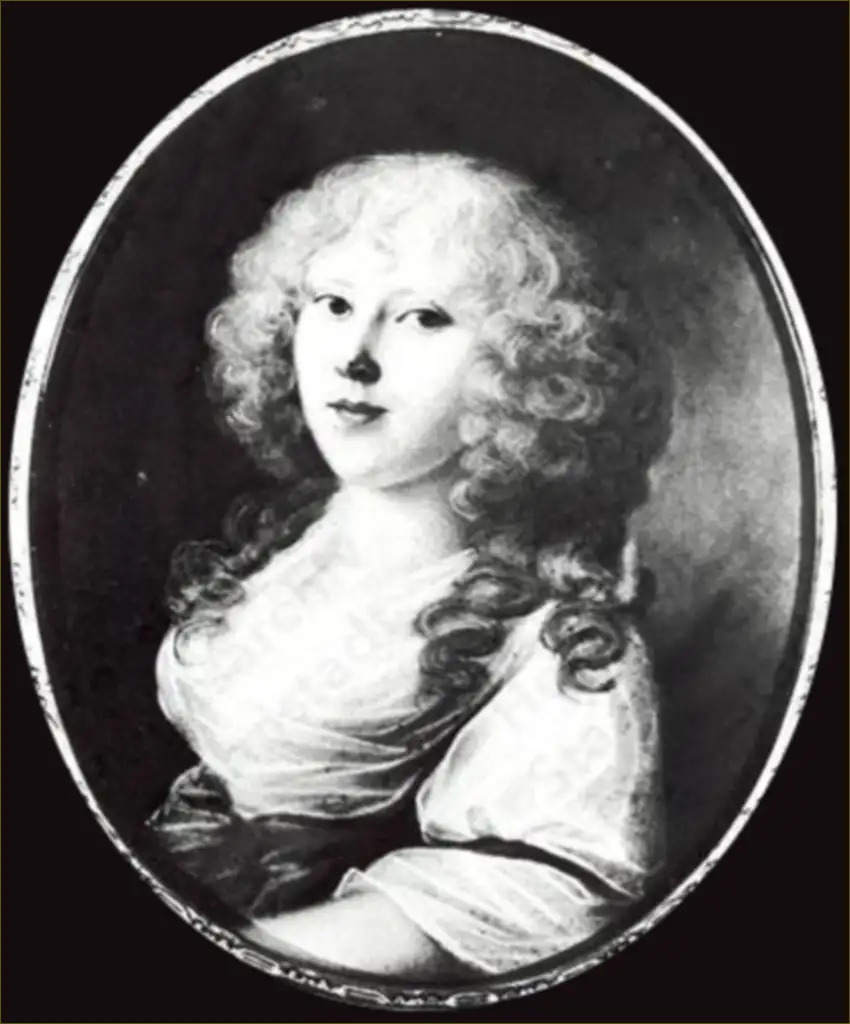
- Portrait c. 1790
- Born: 28 November 1776; Bad Homburg vor der Höhe, Landgraviate of Hesse-Homburg, Holy Roman Empire
- Died: 1 April 1871 (aged 94); Ludwigslust, Grand Duchy of Mecklenburg-Schwerin
- Burial: Helena Paulovna Mausoleum, Ludwigslust
- Spouse: Frederick Louis, Hereditary Grand Duke of Mecklenburg-Schwerin (m. 1818; died 1819)
Names
- German: Auguste Friederike
- Father: Frederick V, Landgrave of Hesse-Homburg
- Mother: Landgravine Caroline of Hesse-Darmstadt

Landgravine Auguste Fredericka of Hesse-Homburg (full German name: Auguste Friederike, Landgräfin von Hessen-Homburg; 28 November 1776, Bad Homburg vor der Höhe, Landgraviate of Hesse-Homburg, Holy Roman Empire – 1 April 1871, Ludwigslust, Grand Duchy of Mecklenburg-Schwerin was a German noblewoman.

== Background and early life ==
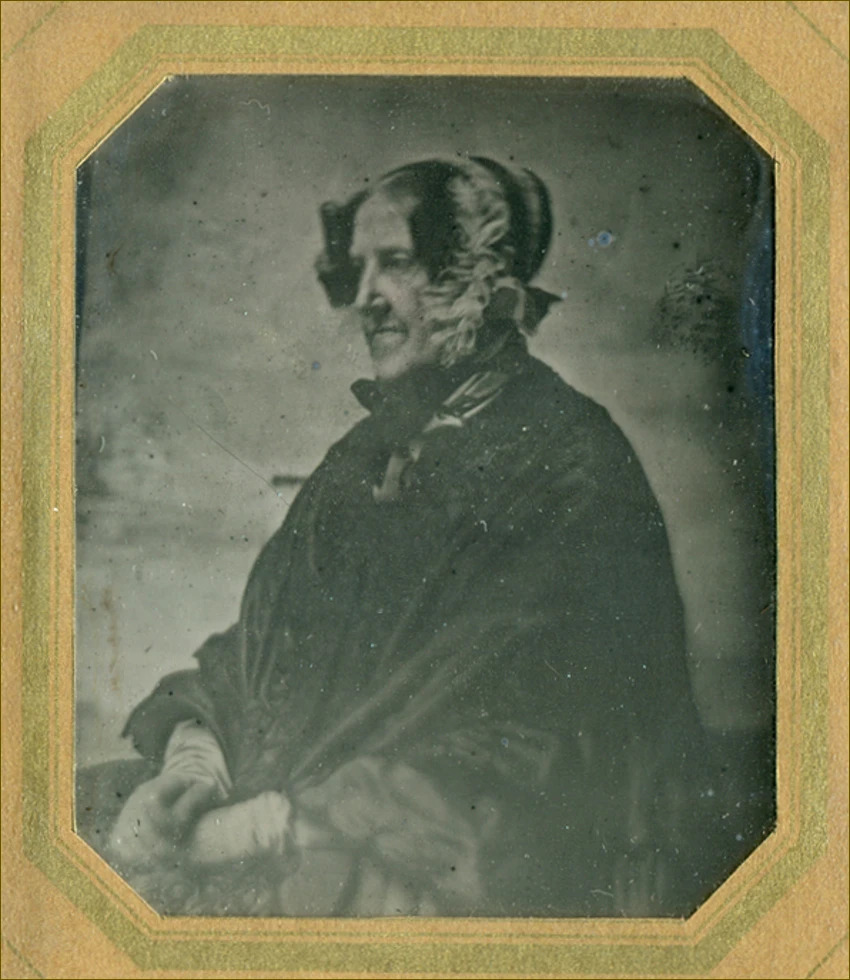
A portrait photograph of Auguste, taken in 1850.

Auguste was the sixth child and fourth daughter of Frederick V, Landgrave of Hesse-Homburg and his wife Landgravine Caroline of Hesse-Darmstadt, in turn daughter of Louis IX, Landgrave of Hesse-Darmstadt. She was a member of the House of Hesse and a Landgravine of Hesse-Homburg by birth. Through her marriage, she became a member of the House of Mecklenburg and Hereditary Grand Duchess of Mecklenburg-Schwerin.

Because all her older sisters married very early, Auguste became by 1793 in the primary caretaker of her parents, and a particular support to her ailing father.

== Life ==
In Homburg on 3 April 1818, the 41-years-old Auguste married Frederick Louis, Hereditary Grand Duke of Mecklenburg-Schwerin, twice a widower and father of four surviving children. The marriage was suggested by the late second wife of the Hereditary Grand Duke, Princess Caroline Louise of Saxe-Weimar-Eisenach (Auguste's first-cousin) at her deathbed.

The union was childless and lasted only 18 months until Frederick Louis' death on 29 November 1819. She was a devoted stepmother for her husband's children, taking responsibility for their upbringing and education. She developed a particularly close relationship with her stepdaughter Helene, second child and only daughter of her cousin Caroline Louise.

Auguste, who never remarried, remained in Mecklenburg-Schwerin for the rest of her life, dying in Ludwigslust aged 94. She was buried at the Helena Paulovna Mausoleum, next to her husband and his two previous wives.

== Ancestry ==
Ancestors of Princess Auguste of Hesse-Homburg

8. Landgrave Kasimir Wilhelm of Hesse-Homburg
4. Frederick IV, Landgrave of Hesse-Homburg
9. Countess Christine Charlotte of Solms-Braunfels
2. Frederick V, Landgrave of Hesse-Homburg
10. Friedrich Wilhelm, Prince of Solms-Braunfels
5. Countess Ulrike Louise of Solms-Braunfels
11. Countess Sophie Magdalena Benigna of Solms-Laubach-Utphe
1. Landgravine Auguste of Hesse-Homburg
12. Louis VIII, Landgrave of Hesse-Darmstadt
6. Louis IX, Landgrave of Hesse-Darmstadt
13. Countess Charlotte of Hanau-Lichtenberg
3. Landgravine Caroline of Hesse-Darmstadt
14. Christian III, Count Palatine of Zweibrücken
7. Countess Palatine Caroline of Zweibrücken
15. Caroline of Nassau-Saarbrücken

== Bibliography ==
- Paule Marquise d’Harcourt: Die Herzogin von Orleáns Helene von Mecklenburg-Schwerin p. 10.
- Karl Schwartz: Landgraf Friedrich V. von Hessen-Homburg und seine Familie. Archives and family documents, Rudolstadt 1878.
