= Charles Joseph, comte Bresson =

French diplomat

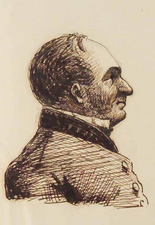

Charles-Joseph, comte Bresson (27 March 1798 in Epinal – 2 November 1847 in Naples) was a French diplomat.

He gained the confidence of King Louis-Philippe of France by successfully arranging the marriages of three of his children: the Prince Royal, Princess Louise d'Orléans and the Duke of Montpensier. Count Bresson committed suicide in 1847 following family and political pressures.

== Life ==
The son of a chef de division in the ministry of foreign affairs, Bresson soon became destined for a diplomatic career. Hyde de Neuville, ministre de la Marine under Charles X, put him in charge of a mission to Colombia.

In 1830 he was ordered to notify Switzerland of Louis-Philippe's accession to the French throne, before becoming first secretary to the French embassy in London under Talleyrand. He was one of two diplomats given the task of forcing the Belgian government to accept the decisions of the London Conference, a task he acquitted well. To the king's satisfaction, he then led the marriage negotiations as to a match between the new king of Belgium Leopold I with princess Louise d'Orléans. That success brought him to the height of favour with Louis-Philippe. During this era he also became the lover of the Belgian ambassador's wife, the comtesse Le Hon, allegedly fathering her son Léopold (born 1832).

In 1833, he was made chargé d'affaires in Berlin with the title of minister plenipotentiary. He re-established relations (with strong compromises) between France and Prussia, ensuring the latter did not undertake any closer rapprochement with Russia. On 10 November 1834 he was appointed France's Foreign Minister in the temporary Hugues-Bernard Maret ministry, but he did not even have the time to reach Paris before that ministry fell. He thus remained in Berlin to arrange the 1837 marriage of the Prince royal to princess Helen of Mecklenburg-Schwerin, of a family allied to the Prussian royal family. After this diplomatic success, Louis-Philippe made him a peer of France on 6 May 1839. In the Chambre des pairs Bresson strongly defended the Paris fortifications project of 1841 in which the king took particular interest.

He was then made ambassador to Madrid and played a major role in the difficult marriage negotiations to marry Isabella II of Spain to her cousin the duke of Cadiz (which occurred on 10 October 1846) and the duke of Montpensier to princess Luisa Fernanda, a sister of Isabella II. During these negotiations France's interests were vigorously opposed to those of the July Monarchy's erstwhile ally the United Kingdom, and so count Bresson had to thwart sometimes disloyal manoeuvres by Sir Henry Bulwer, the British ambassador to Spain. In reward for this success, Bresson's son was made a grandee of Spain, 1st class, with the title of 'duke of Sainte-Isabelle'. Bresson himself was recalled to France in 1847, spending a few weeks in London before being appointed ambassador to Naples, a post he had only just taken up when he cut his throat with a razor and died, probably due to domestic troubles.

== See also ==
- List of Ambassadors of France to the United Kingdom

Political offices
Preceded by Henri de Rigny	Foreign Minister; 1834-1834	Succeeded by Henri de Rigny

== Sources ==
- (in French) Adolphe Robert & Gaston Cougny, Dictionnaire des Parlementaires français, Paris, Dourloton, 1889
