= Civil list of the July Monarchy =

The civil list of the July Monarchy was a civil list set up by King Louis Philippe I of the French under the July Monarchy by a law of 2 March 1832, on the model of the Civil List in the United Kingdom. This law decreed that its amount be 12 million francs annually, along with 1 million annually for the King's eldest son, Prince Ferdinand Philippe, who was The Prince Royal and Duc d'Orléans.
