= Princess Caroline Louise of Saxe-Weimar-Eisenach =

Princess Caroline Louise
- Hereditary Grand Duchess of Mecklenburg-Schwerin
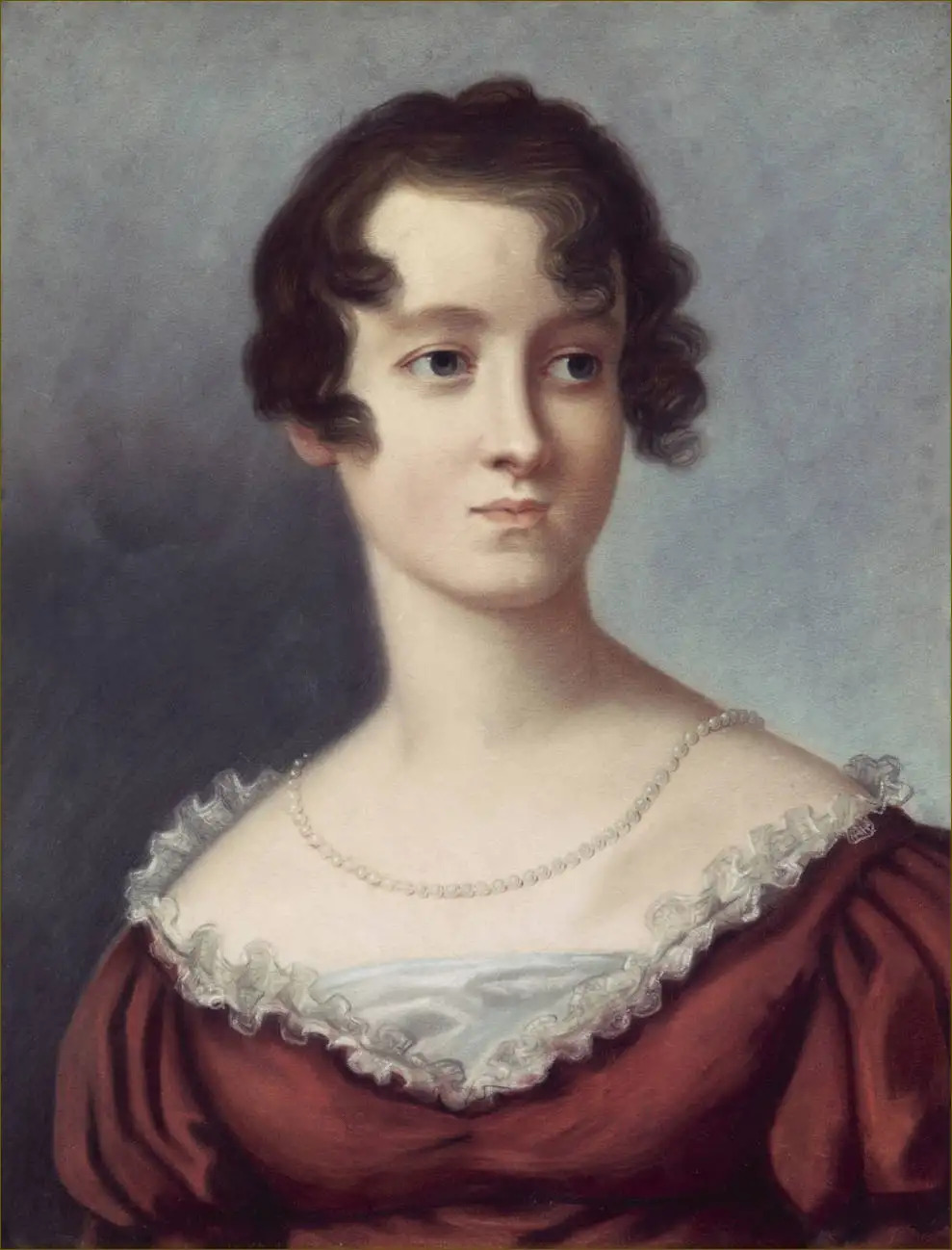
- Portrait by Jakob Wilhelm Roux, 1808
- Born: 18 July 1786; Stadtschloss, Weimar
- Died: 20 January 1816 (aged 29); Schloss Ludwigslust, Mecklenburg
- Spouse: Frederick Louis, Hereditary Grand Duke of Mecklenburg-Schwerin (m. 1810)
- Issue: Duke Albert; Hélène, Duchess of Orléans; Duke Magnus
Names
- Karoline Luise
- House: Saxe-Weimar-Eisenach
- Father: Charles Augustus, Grand Duke of Saxe-Weimar-Eisenach
- Mother: Louise of Hesse-Darmstadt

Princess Caroline Louise of Saxe-Weimar-Eisenach (Karoline Luise; 18 July 1786 – 20 January 1816) was a princess of Mecklenburg-Schwerin by virtue of her marriage. She was the daughter of Charles Augustus, Grand Duke of Saxe-Weimar-Eisenach and Louisa of Hesse-Darmstadt.

== Infancy ==
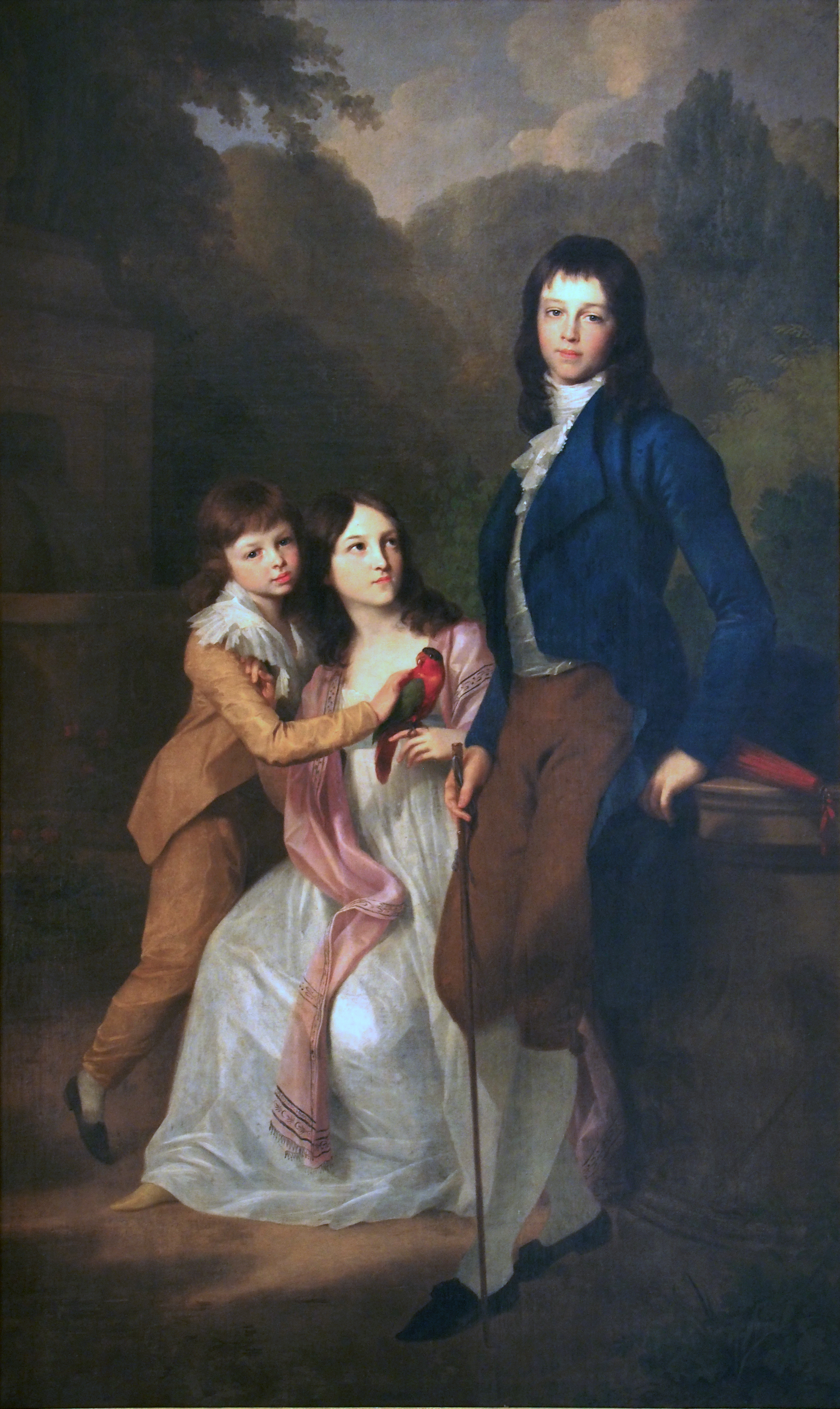
Caroline with her brothers Karl Friedrich (right) and Bernhard, painting by Johann Heinrich Wilhelm Tischbein, 1798

Caroline was born at the Stadtschloss in Weimar on 18 July 1786 as a princess of Saxe-Weimar-Eisenach. She was the second of three children to reach adulthood, with her older brother Charles Frederick succeeding their father as Grand Duke in 1828. One of Caroline's nieces was Empress Augusta of Germany, wife of William I, German Emperor.

== Hereditary Grand Duchess ==
On 1 July 1810, she became the second wife of Frederick Ludwig, Hereditary Grand Duke of Mecklenburg-Schwerin. The Hereditary Grand Duke had lost his first wife Elena Pavlovna of Russia in September 1804 after she died of influenza. Caroline Louise gave her husband three children. Her only daughter, Hélène, married Ferdinand Philippe, Duke of Orléans, son of Louis Philippe I of the French. She had a loving relationship with her husband.

After the birth of her youngest child, Prince Magnus, her health never recovered and she died at the age of 29 at Schloss Ludwigslust. On her deathbed, she suggested to her husband that he remarry, recommending her cousin Auguste Fredericka, daughter of Frederick V of Hesse-Homburg. They married in April 1818.

== Issue ==
1. Albert of Mecklenburg-Schwerin (11 February 1812 – 18 October 1834) died unmarried.
2. Hélène of Mecklenburg-Schwerin (24 January 1814 – 17 May 1858) married Ferdinand Philippe, Duke of Orléans and had issue.
3. Magnus of Mecklenburg-Schwerin (3 May 1815 – 25 April 1816) died in infancy.

== Ancestry ==
Ancestors of Princess Caroline Louise of Saxe-Weimar-Eisenach

8. Ernest Augustus I, Duke of Saxe-Weimar-Eisenach
4. Ernest Augustus II, Duke of Saxe-Weimar-Eisenach
9. Margravine Sophie Charlotte of Brandenburg-Bayreuth
2. Charles Augustus, Grand Duke of Saxe-Weimar-Eisenach
10. Charles I, Duke of Brunswick-Wolfenbüttel
5. Duchess Anna Amalia of Brunswick-Wolfenbüttel
11. Princess Philippine Charlotte of Prussia
1. Princess Caroline of Saxe-Weimar-Eisenach
12. Louis VIII, Landgrave of Hesse-Darmstadt
6. Louis IX, Landgrave of Hesse-Darmstadt
13. Countess Charlotte of Hanau-Lichtenberg
3. Princess Louise of Hesse-Darmstadt
14. Christian III, Count Palatine of Zweibrücken
7. Countess Palatine Caroline of Zweibrücken
15. Countess Caroline of Nassau-Saarbrücken
