= Prince Ferdinand Philippe, Duke of Orléans =

French prince (1810–1842)

Ferdinand Philippe
- Prince Royal of France; Duke of Orléans
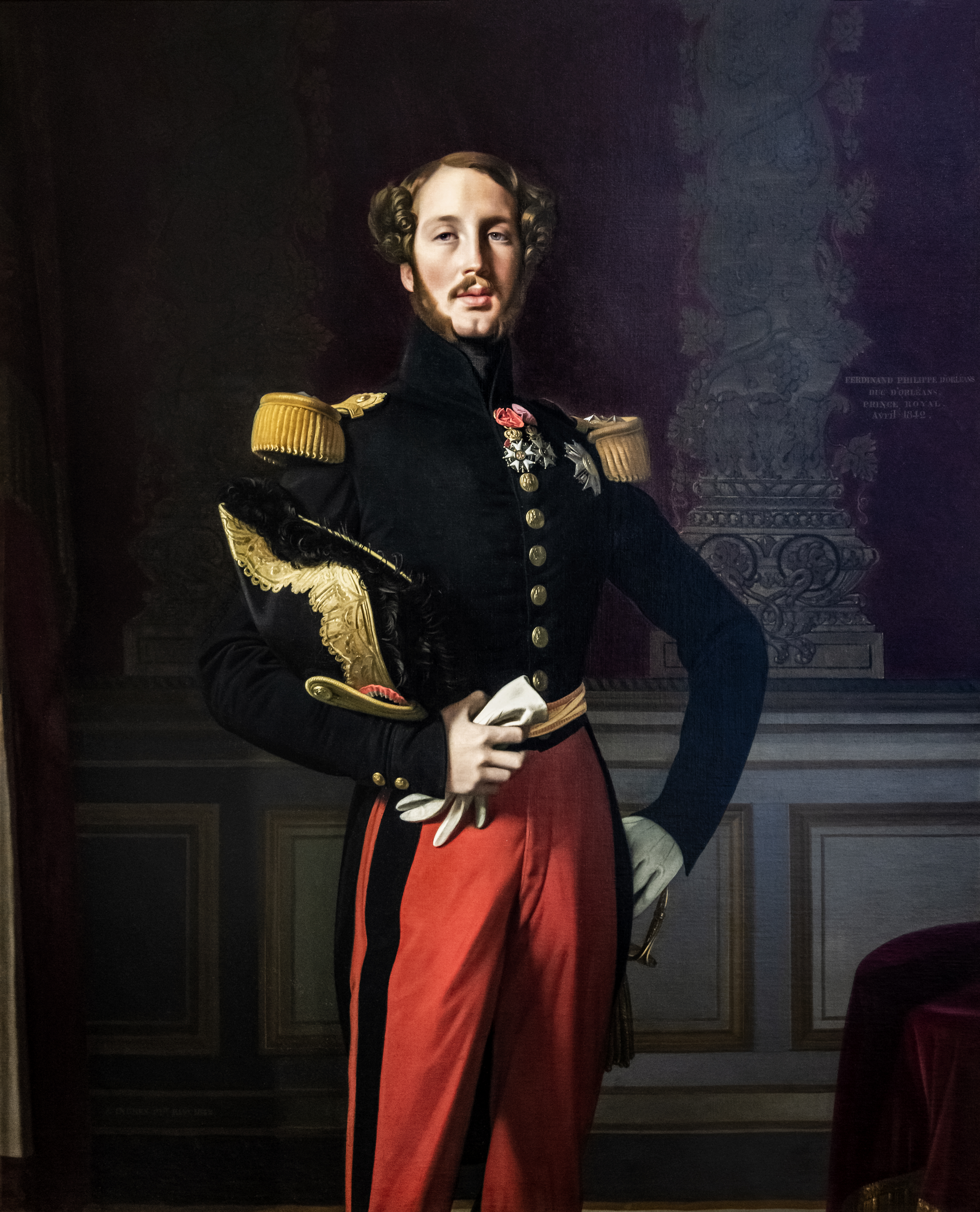
- Portrait of the Duke of Orléans by Ingres, 1842
- Born: 3 September 1810; Palermo, Kingdom of Sicily
- Died: 13 July 1842 (aged 31); Sablonville, Kingdom of France
- Burial: 16 July 1842; Chapelle royale de Dreux
- Spouse: Duchess Helene of Mecklenburg-Schwerin (m. 1837)
- Issue: Prince Philippe, Count of Paris; Prince Robert, Duke of Chartres
Names
- Ferdinand Philippe Louis Charles Henri Joseph
- House: Orléans
- Father: Louis Philippe I
- Mother: Maria Amalia of Naples and Sicily

Prince Ferdinand Philippe, Duke of Orléans (Ferdinand Philippe Louis Charles Henri Joseph; 3 September 1810 – 13 July 1842) was the eldest son of King Louis Philippe I of France and Maria Amalia of Naples and Sicily. He was born in exile in his mother's native Sicily while his parents were the Duke and Duchess of Orléans. Ferdinand Philippe was heir to the House of Orléans from birth. Following his father's succession as King of the French in 1830, he became the Prince Royal of France and Duke of Orléans. He died in 1842, never to succeed his father or see the collapse of the July Monarchy and subsequent exile of his family to the United Kingdom.

== Early life ==
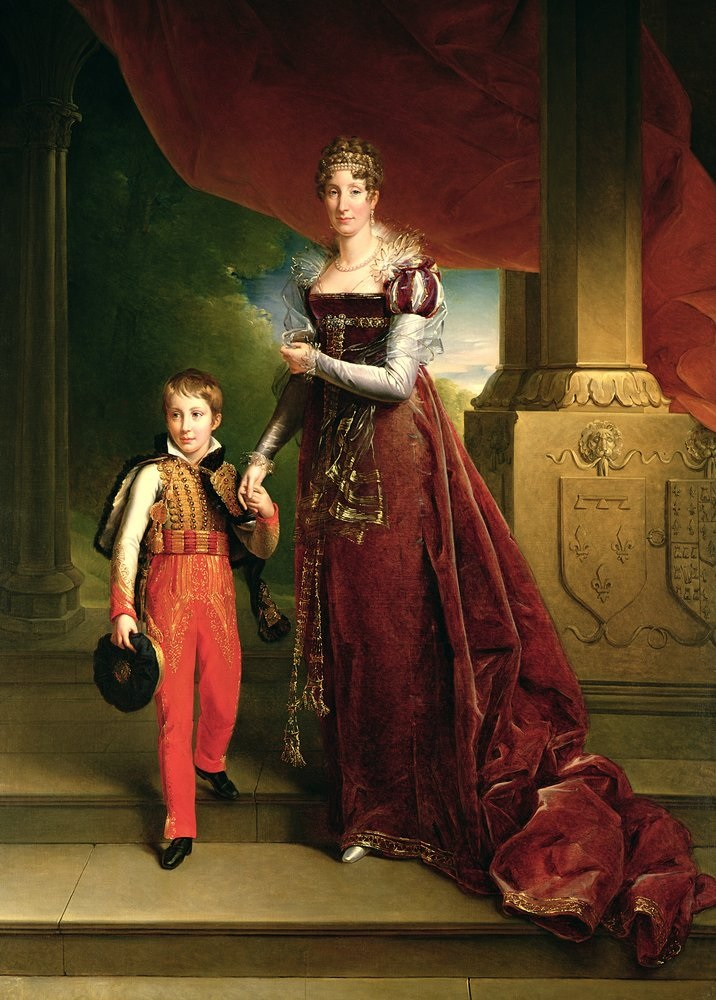
Ferdinand Philippe with his mother in 1819. His parents' coats of arms can be seen on the column. Painting by Louis Joseph Noyal after François Gérard

Born in Palermo in September 1810, during his parents' exile, he was given the title Duke of Chartres (and was called Chartres within the family circle). He was baptised Ferdinand Philippe Louis Charles Henri Joseph and known as Ferdinand Philippe in honour of his grandfathers, Ferdinand I of the Two Sicilies and Philippe Égalité. Despite having been born in exile, he held the rank of prince of the blood and was styled Serene Highness. As the eldest son, he was the heir to the title of Duke of Orléans, head of the House of Orléans (a cadet branch of the Bourbons of France descended from the only brother of Louis XIV).

The young prince first visited France in 1814 during the First Restoration, settling there more permanently in 1817. In 1819, his father put him in the care of a tutor, M. de Boismilon, at the Collège Henri-IV. Louis Philippe wished his son to receive a liberal education on a foundation of complete equality with his fellow students. Ferdinand Philippe was highly successful in his studies and took courses at the École polytechnique. After a trip to Great Britain (visiting both England and Scotland) in 1819, he went to Lunéville to join the 1st Hussar Regiment, of which he was made colonel by Charles X in 1824. In September 1824, King Charles X granted him the style "Royal Highness", a style maintained by Ferdinand Philippe at his father's accession to the throne six years later.

== July Revolution ==
In 1830, during the July Revolution, the young Duke of Chartres was on garrison duty at Joigny. He made his regiment wear the tricolor cockade and quickly led them to aid the uprising in Paris. He was temporarily stopped at Montrouge, and entered Paris on 3 August at the head of his regiment. When his father was offered the French throne by the Chamber of Deputies, Prince Ferdinand Philippe received the title of Duke of Orléans, Prince of Orléans, and also became Prince Royal, the heir apparent to the throne. Upon entering the Conseil (at his father's bidding), Ferdinand Philippe, who had something of a temper, criticised the time lost by ministers' prevarications and was frequently embroiled in skirmishes with the doctrinaires, to whom he wished to impart the sentiments of revolutionary youth. When Casimir Périer was nominated president of the Conseil in March 1831, he accepted the post only on condition that Ferdinand Philippe be excluded from the Conseil.

In November 1831, the young Duke of Orléans and Marshal Jean-de-Dieu Soult were sent to repress the Canut revolts. He acquitted himself of this difficult task without violence and managed to rapidly appease opponents of the July Monarchy, even gaining a certain popularity. During the cholera outbreak in 1832, he did not hesitate to take real risks in visiting the most sickly patients at the Hôtel-Dieu de Paris, accompanied by Casimir Périer (who caught the disease and died). In the eyes of the people and the press he was seen as a generous prince, sincerely preoccupied with the plight of the poor, and he became a sort of icon for the dynastic opposition of politician Odilon Barrot, who saw in him the only prince capable of reconciling modern France's democratic aspirations with the heritage of its monarchical past. On 2 March 1832 he was granted an annual income of 1 million francs under his father's new Civil List.

== Military career ==
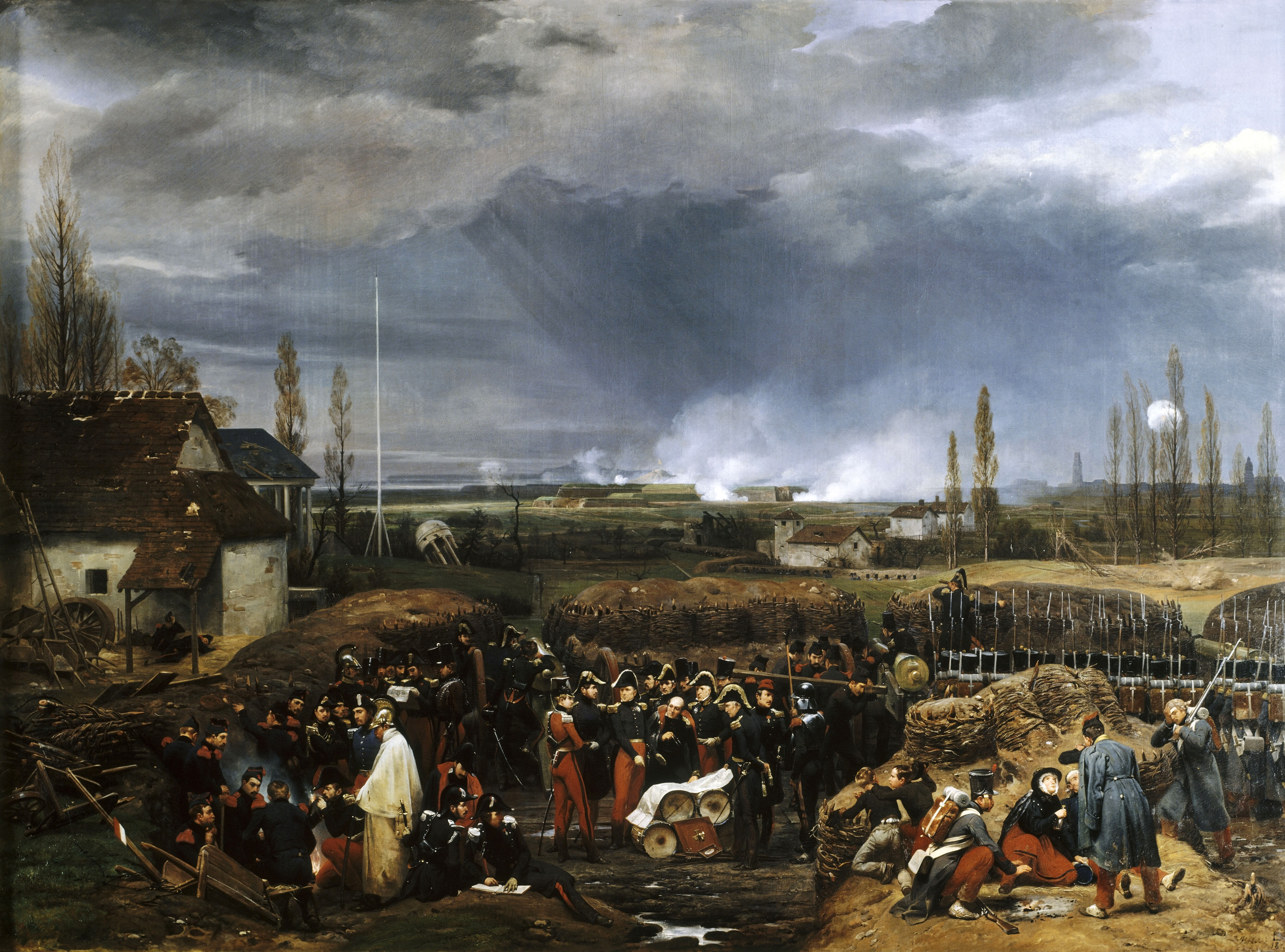
The Siege of Antwerp by Horace Vernet. Orléans is shown with his brother Nemours and Marshal Gérard preparing for the Assault on the Dutch-held citadel of Antwerp

In 1831, under Marshal Étienne Maurice Gérard, Ferdinand Philippe and his younger brother Prince Louis, Duke of Nemours, set out on their first campaign. When the princes entered Belgium in 1831, they eagerly visited the plain of Jemmapes, where their father had fought in 1792. The following year, Ferdinand Philippe returned to Belgium in command of the vanguard brigade of the Armée du Nord. On 20 November 1832 he was before the citadel of Antwerp, and commanded the trenches on the night of 29/30 November. During the attack on the Saint-Laurent Lunette, he launched himself onto the parapet amidst a hail of projectiles to lead the action and arouse his soldiers' courage.

In 1835, when Marshal Bertrand Clauzel was sent to Algeria as Governor General, the young Prince Royal asked his father for permission to accompany him, so he could fight the Emir Abd El-Kader. He participated with Clauzel's army in the Battle of Habrah, where he was wounded, and in the capture of Mascara in December 1835. He then participated in the taking of Tlemcen in January 1836. When he returned to Paris, it was with an aura of military glory, and he returned to Algeria in autumn 1839 to take possession of the country's interior (from Constantine to Algiers) for France alongside Marshal Sylvain Charles Valée. He left Constantine on 16 October, three days after the second anniversary of the town's capture, and reached Algiers on 2 November via Sétif and the Iron Gates pass. Abd-el-Kader saw this as a violation of the Treaty of Tafna and unleashed jihad upon the French. This led to an escalation in tension and, ultimately, Algeria's wholesale occupation by France. Ferdinand Philippe set out for Algeria a third time in March 1840, taking with him his younger brother the Duke of Aumale, tutoring him in his first military experience. Present at the battles of Affroun, Oued'Ger and Bois des Oliviers, he was put in charge of directing the attackers in the capture of Teniah de Mouzaïa. After this campaign he was recalled to France for good.

This brilliant military career increased his popularity and prestige. He also devoted himself to the improvement of the troops' living conditions and morale. At Saint-Omer he organised the chasseurs de Vincennes, who became the chasseurs d'Orléans in 1836, and re-formed the chasseurs à pied de Vincennes. He laid the foundations for a Histoire des Régiments, commissioned by order of the Minister of War, and began writing the service histories of the two regiments he had himself commanded.

== Marriage negotiations ==
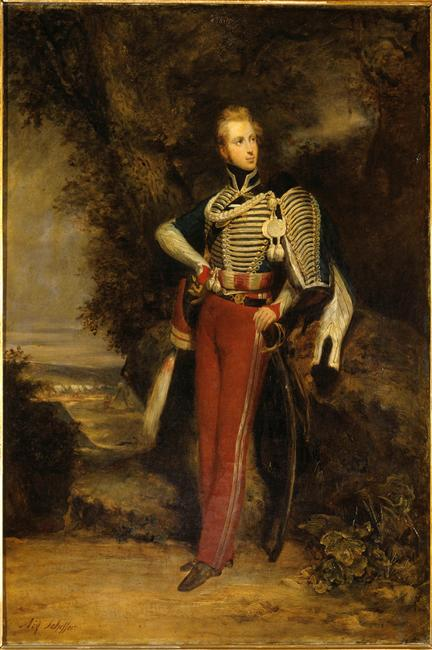
Ferdinand Philippe in hussar uniform by Ary Scheffer, c. 1830

Ferdinand Philippe's marriage had long been one of the July Monarchy's major political affairs. Had it not been for the 1830 Revolution, he would have married the sister of Henri, Count of Chambord, Louise d'Artois (1819–1864). Her family called off the marriage plans when Ferdinand Philippe's branch of the family 'usurped' the throne. From 1835, after an assassination attempt by Giuseppe Fieschi and his co-conspirators, Ferdinand Philippe's father had been obsessed with the marital prospects of his son, then 25. Blanche-Joséphine Le Bascle d'Argenteuil noted, in her Souvenirs, that if the Prince Royal died young after having fathered a male heir, the July Monarchy would be faced with the prospect of a regency, in all its political uncertainty – thus, for her, the wisest course consisted of marrying off the King's third son, then the fourth, then the fifth, guaranteeing Louis Philippe descendants, all the while leaving several men around the throne who could take over from him if he died suddenly.

At this time the July Monarchy was searching for new allies in Continental Europe so they would not have to depend solely on the United Kingdom. Talleyrand, fresh from renouncing his embassy to London and close to the British Foreign Secretary, Lord Palmerston, pointed in this direction. The King at first envisaged a rapprochement with Russia via Württemberg. King Wilhelm I, widower of Grand Duchess Catherine Pavlovna of Russia, had two daughters of marriageable age, Princesses Marie (born 1816) and Sophie (born 1818). Wilhelm I's sister Catharina had already made an inauspicious French marriage alliance to Jérôme Bonaparte and so Wilhelm declined the proposition as humiliating. He later was to accept Marie's even more humiliating marriage to Count Alfred von Neipperg in 1840. Queen Louise wrote to her parents on Marie's marriage that "We see singular things. It was not at all probable that this daughter, who the king of Württemberg did not wish to give to Chartres for fear of his ending his days [in exile] in America, should end up marrying a miserable little Austrian officer without illustriousness and of very ordinary birth."

Louis Philippe next envisaged an alliance with Austria via the marriage of his son to Archduchess Maria Theresa (born 1816), daughter of Archduke Karl, Duke of Teschen (German: Herzog von Teschen). Queen Marie Amélie was highly favourable to such a match as she was herself a daughter of an Austrian archduchess (Maria Carolina of Austria), and Archduke Karl was not opposed to it. However, Karl faced determined opponents on two sides – Prince Metternich, who did not want to repeat his error in marrying Marie Louise to Napoleon, and Archduchess Sophie, a Bavarian princess and sister-in-law of the new Kaiser Ferdinand I, who dominated the Vienna court with her strong personality, and was awaiting her son Franz Joseph I's ascent to the imperial throne. France's ambassador to Vienna, the Count of Sainte-Aulaire, who had been put in charge of preparing the ground for an Austrian match, felt the possibility was difficult if not completely impossible. The new President of the Conseil, Adolphe Thiers, dreamed of concluding such a match and becoming a new Duke of Choiseul as the maker of a spectacular reversal in the alliances of Europe.

Ferdinand Philippe and his younger brother, the Prince Louis, Duke of Nemours, set out on a European tour on 2 May 1836. Ferdinand Philippe and Queen Marie-Amélie got off to a bad start when the young French Prince Royal refused to shave off the proud beard that had set a fashion among French youth. She wrote back to Queen Louise complaining that "there was a lack of tact there and of sentiments of convenience that afflicted me. [...] I believe that Leopold I can say to him that a goatee beard on the face of a prince royal is contrary to all German manners. Here, [such a beard] is neither handsome nor fortunate, there it can be fatal." The two French princes were a great success in Berlin and Vienna, staying at the latter from 29 May to 11 June. However, the Marquis de Sémonville commented that "everyone has shaken their hand, but no one was close to them". Even if the young Prince Royal decidedly liked Archduke Karl and his daughter, Prince Metternich and the Archduchess Sophie put up a major barrage of problems, and news of Thiers (impatient to conclude the match) being on his way was enough to convince Louis Philippe to make a marriage proposal. He was refused, though to play to French susceptibilities the official version was that the refusal was because of the "feelings" of Archduchess Marie-Thérèse. Queen Louise wrote to her mother on 14 June 1836: "I am upset to see that you have thrown your all behind the cause of Austria [...] I have always thought that Chartres was of too high birth to marry she who seems to him the most minor princess in Germany; and I avow that I would better like to see him marry a princess from Lippe or Waldeck who was good and pretty and of robust health, rather than an archduchess of Austria who would bring us all sorts of evils in her dowry. [...] Napoleon, in this situation, was able to make sacrifices to ally himself with Austria; and we all saw what profit he got from it. But we are not upstarts, and have no need of ennobling ourselves by uniting with the house of Lorraine".

The two young princes returned to France via Italy. At Trento they were received by Marie Louise, Duchess of Parma, the former Empress Consort of the French, who could not refrain from tears at the similarity between the Prince Royal and her son, the late Duke of Reichstadt. At Milan they stayed with Archduke Rainer Joseph of Austria, Viceroy of Lombardy-Venetia, where they heard the news of Alibaud's assassination attempt on King Louis Philippe on 25 June. After the Austrians' refusal of the match, only two potential Catholic princesses remained (Louis-Philippe confided to one of his familiars "I would prefer her to be a Catholic. You believe it is nothing, the Carlists believe it is everything; and I myself believe that it is neither here nor there"), and these were both very young for marriage (born in 1821): Princess Januária of Brazil, daughter of Emperor Pedro I of Brazil, and the Infanta Isabella of Spain, daughter of the Infante Francisco de Paula, younger brother of King Ferdinand VII. The former was excluded by her remoteness, and the latter due to her family's unfortunate history (her mother Princess Luisa Carlotta of the Two Sicilies, niece of Queen Marie-Amélie, was monstrously obese) and her physical appearance (she was red-haired and thin; Queen Louise wrote to Queen Marie-Amélie on 21 November 1836 that "I send you her portrait, that Leopold found hideous. Her hair especially is frightening in terms of the children she will have. If all her family are ginger, this will afflict them [too]".

== Marriage ==
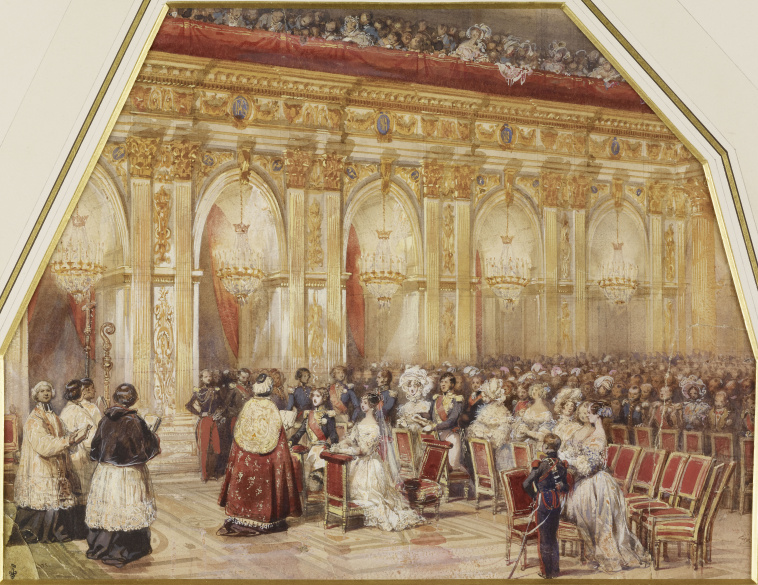
Marriage of Ferdinand Philippe and Helene of Mecklenburg-Schwerin by Eugène Lami, 1837

Some possibilities were also seen among the Protestant German princesses. Via his great-niece the Duchess of Dino, Talleyrand suggested Princess Louise of Hesse-Kassel (born 1817 to a cousin of the Elector of Hesse and his wife, a Danish princess), whilst Queen Louise suggested Princess Marie of Saxe-Altenburg (born 1818 to the Duke of Saxe-Altenburg and Princess Amelia of Wurtemberg, and who finally ended up marrying King George V of Hanover in 1843), and Princess Victoria of Saxe-Coburg and Gotha (daughter of an elder brother of King Leopold I of the Belgians; she was actually raised a Catholic and married the Prince Royal's younger brother, the Duke of Nemours, in 1840).

However, the negotiators' choice finally came to rest on Duchess Helene Luise Elisabeth of Mecklenburg-Schwerin (known as Hélène, 1814–1858), daughter of the late Prince Frederick Louis, Hereditary Grand Duke of Mecklenburg-Schwerin, and his wife Princess Caroline Louise of Saxe-Weimar-Eisenach. For Ferdinand Philippe, it was a convenient alliance but one without much attraction; Metternich quipped that she was "petite but of a good house". She was the niece of King Friedrich Wilhelm III of Prussia, whose wife was born Louise of Mecklenburg-Strelitz (this did not avoid difficulties for the marriage in Berlin, which the French ambassador there, the Count Bresson, succeeded in resolving). Nicholas I of Russia, for his part, affected disdain of the marriage, proclaiming that such a minor marriage was not worth the trouble to prevent.

The Duke of Broglie was sent to Germany as ambassador extraordinary with the aim of presenting the official marriage request and bringing the princess back to France. An anonymous but virulent libel against the House of Orléans was published by a prince of the House of Mecklenburg. That House avoided the marriage, so that Duchess Hélène was only accompanied to France by her father's widow, Augusta of Hesse-Homburg. The marriage was celebrated on 30 May 1837 at the Château de Fontainebleau, since Hyacinthe-Louis de Quélen, the Archbishop of Paris, had used the pretext of religious differences to forbid it from taking place in Notre Dame de Paris. The civil ceremony occurred in the galerie Henri II on 30 May 1837, presided over by the Baron Pasquier, whom the King rewarded on 27 May by making him Lord Chancellor of France. The Catholic ceremony was presided over by Romain-Frédéric Gallard, Bishop of Meaux, in the chapel of Henri IV, whilst the Lutheran one was celebrated by Pastor Cuvier in the Salon Louis Philippe. As his witnesses, Ferdinand Philippe had the four vice-presidents of the Chamber of Peers: Baron Séguier, Count Portalis, the Duke of Broglie, and the Count de Bastard; the president and four vice presidents of the Chamber of Deputies: Dupin, Jean-Louis Calmon, Delessert, Jacqueminot, Cunin-Gridaine; three marshals: the Duke of Dalmatie, the Count de Lobau and Gérard, as well as the Prince de Talleyrand, the Duke of Choiseul, and Count Bresson, France's minister to Berlin.

The ceremony was well attended, but there was a notable lack of foreign ambassadors, except for Baron von Werther (Prussia), Count Le Hon (Belgium), and the chargé d'affaires of Mecklembourg. The reception was brilliant; the Duchesse de Maillé observed:

Princess Hélène was not a king's daughter, and so the model for [the ceremonies] was the reception for Madame the Duchess of Burgundy, and all that happened in the house of Sa Majesté citoyenne was as if Louis XIV was present amidst the most major lords of France. Some believed that Louis Philippe made a political mistake. I think not. To the contrary, he greatly pleased his supporters. The pomp did not displease those whose names figured in it, in place of the great lords who so envied them. Louis Philippe was the man of the middle class, elected by them, and they know that full well, but they were flattered by the shine in which he surrounded himself. If he did not seek to regild this kingdom that [the middle class] has given him, its self-respect would be wounded. His supporters thought themselves great lords when they saw a great king.

The marriage was very happy and produced two children:

1. Prince Philippe, Count of Paris (1838–1894), Prince Royal, married Princess Marie Isabelle of Orléans, Infanta of Spain (1848–1919), and had issue.
2. Prince Robert, Duke of Chartres (1840–1910), married Princess Françoise of Orléans (1844–1925) and had issue.

== Patron of the arts ==
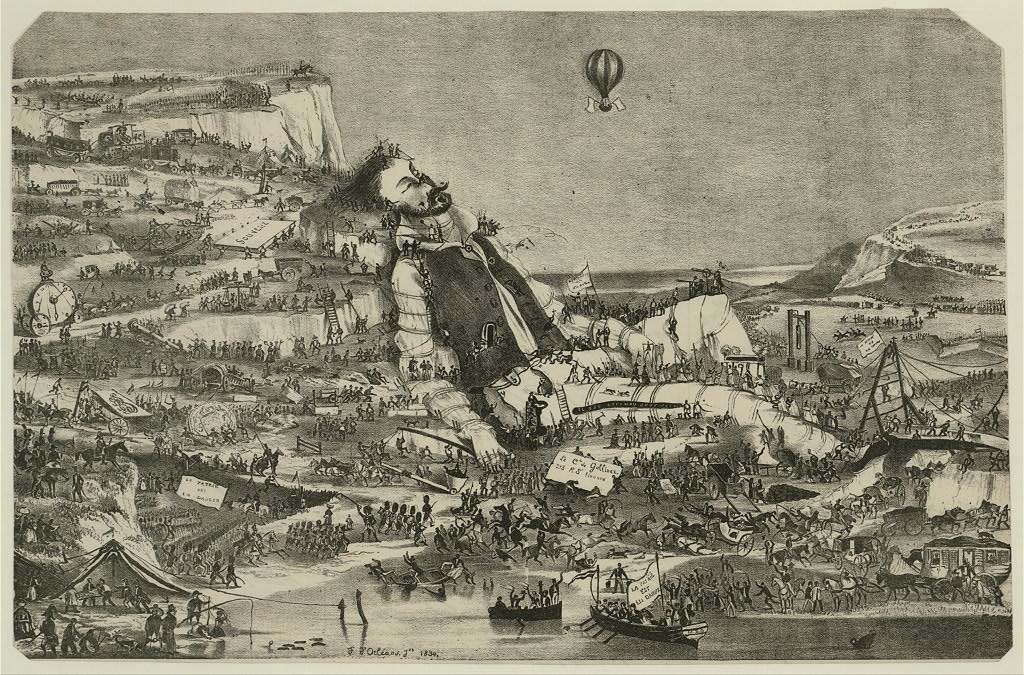
"The fatherland in danger" Lithograph by Ferdinand-Philippe d'Orléans (1830)

Ferdinand Philippe loved literature, music, and the fine arts, and had a pronounced taste for collecting, "making his choice slowly, like a true lover [of the arts]". Each year he spent 100,000 to 150,000 francs from his Civil List allowance on art purchases or cultural patronage. In his vast apartments in the Palais des Tuileries he gathered medieval and Renaissance objects, ceramics by Bernard Palissy, Hispano-Moorish majolica and ceramics, Chinese and Japanese porcelain, and furniture by Caffieri, Oeben, Riesener, and Jacob.

He was passionate about modern painters, buying several canvasses from Ary Scheffer and Newton Fielding, both of whom had taught Ferdinand Philippe landscape painting from 1822 to 1830. He possessed works by Ferdinand-Victor-Eugène Delacroix (The Prisoner of Chillon, The Assassination of the Bishop of Liège, Hamlet and Horatio in the Graveyard), Alexandre-Gabriel Decamps (The Defeat of the Cimbri), Eugène Lami, Ernest Meissonnier, and Paul Delaroche. He loved landscapes by painters of the Barbizon school, notably Camille Corot, Paul Huet, and Théodore Rousseau. He commissioned Jean-Auguste-Dominique Ingres to paint Antiochus and Stratonice (1833), bought his Œdipus and the Sphinx in 1839, and commissioned his portrait from him in 1840.

A talented draughtsman, Ferdinand Philippe made amateur engravings. Twelve etchings and lithographs by him are known. These include a satire showing the sleeping Gulliver with Lilliputians all round him on foot, on horseback and a sign referring to the alarmist proclamation of 11 July 1792 by the Legislative Assembly that declared the fatherland to be in danger.

== Death ==
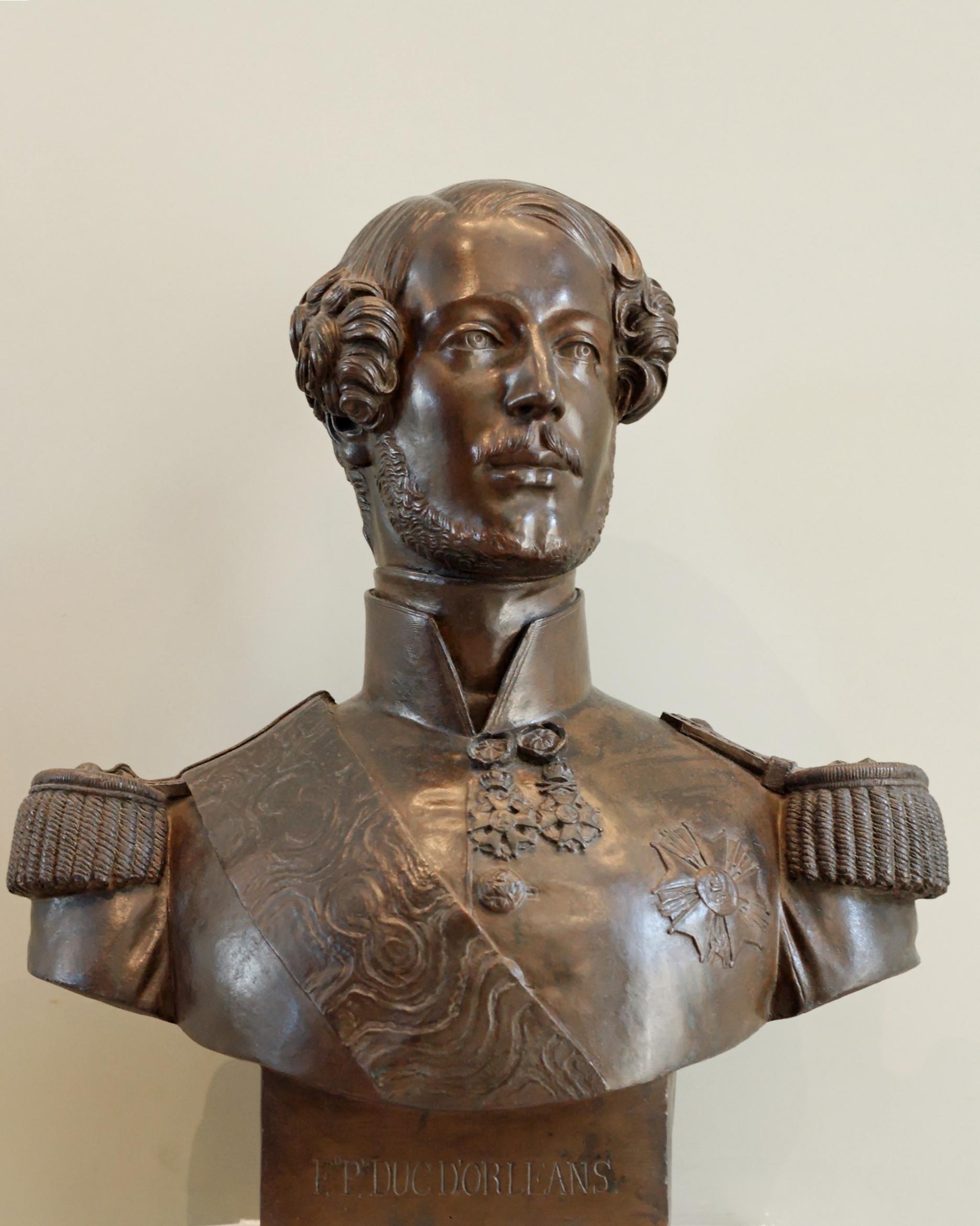
Bust by James Pradier, after his death mask, 1842, Louvre

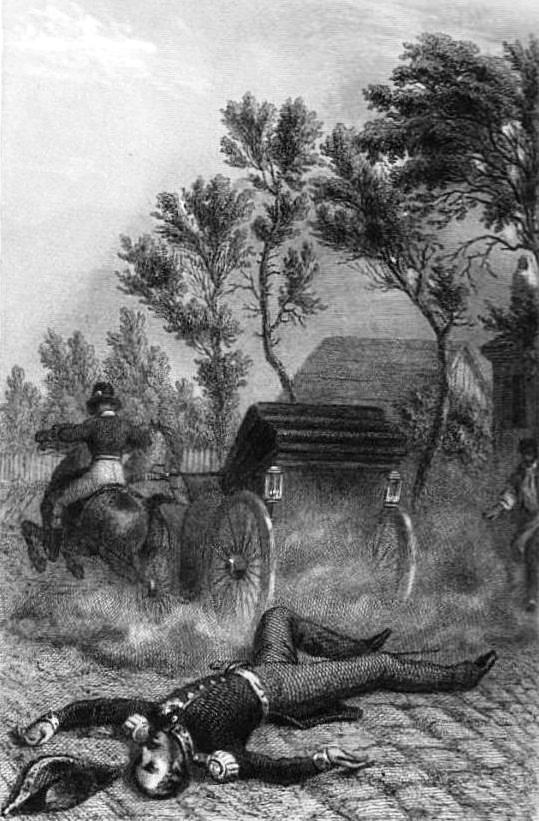
Depiction of Ferdinand-Philippe d’Orléans' death.

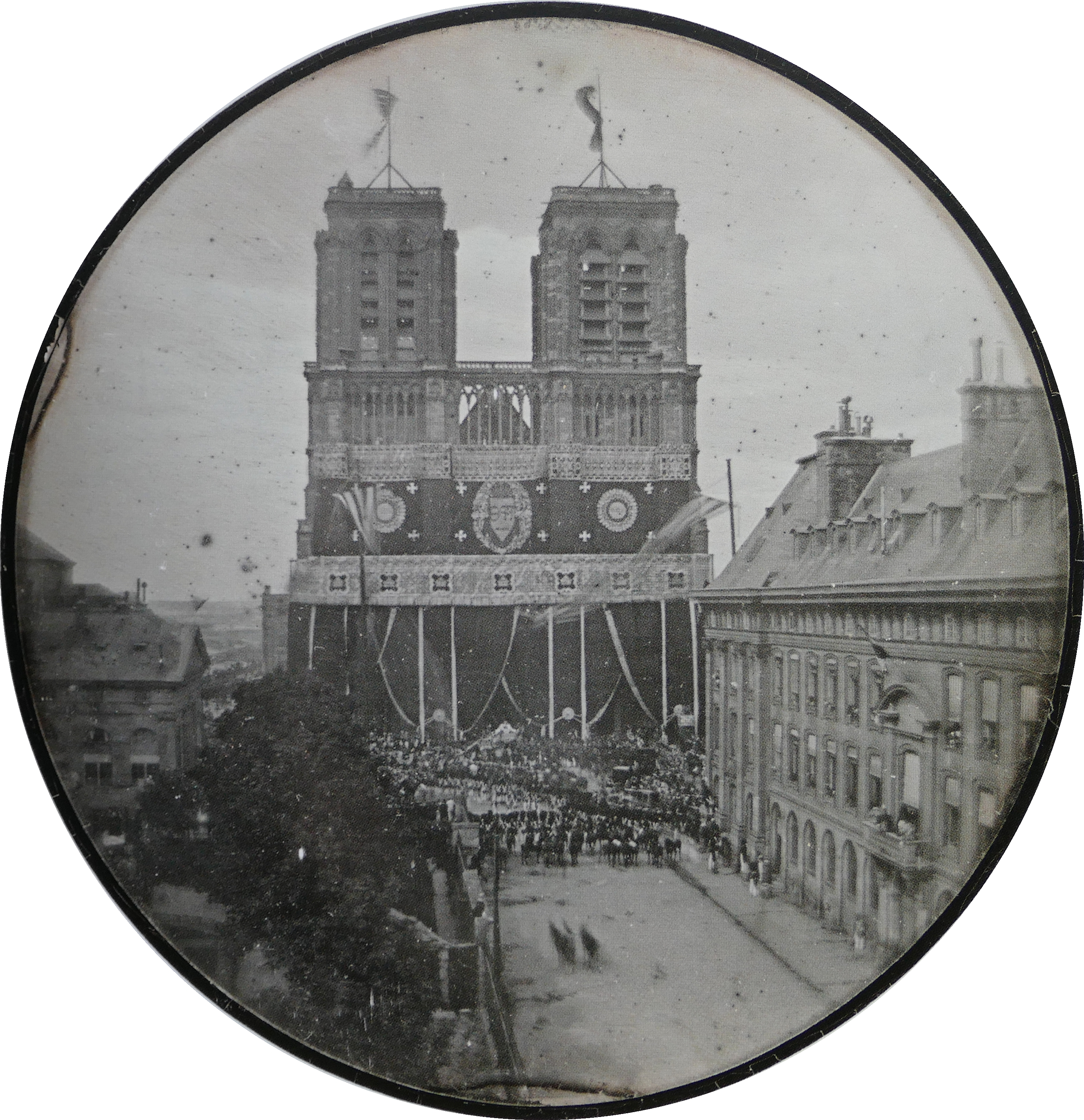
Funeral of the Duke of Orleans in Paris, 1842, daguerréotype, Paris, Musée d'Orsay.

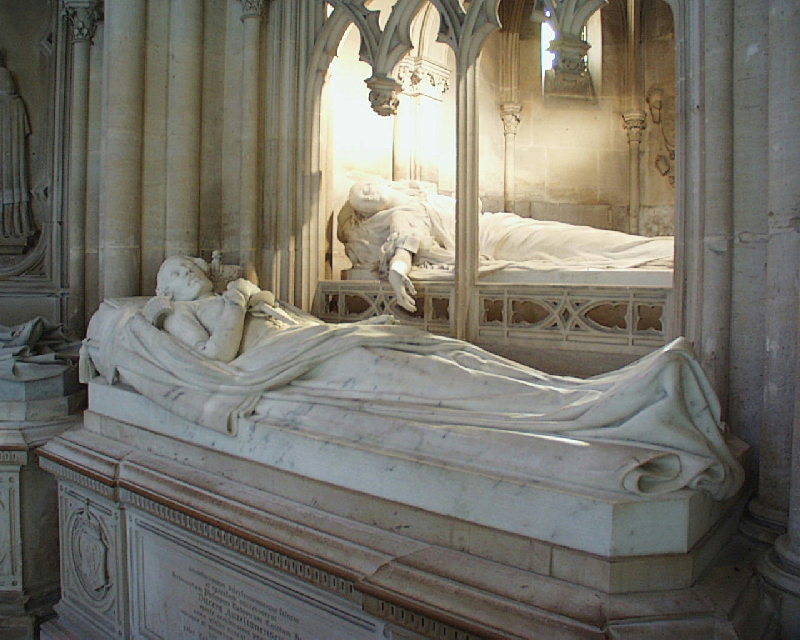
Tomb effegies of the Duke of Orleans and his wife, Chapelle Royale at Dreux.

In 1842, the Duke was scheduled to leave for Saint-Omer to review part of the army of which he had been made the commander that was engaged at the Marne. He planned to travel from the Tuileries Palace to Neuilly-sur-Seine on 13 July 1842 to say goodbye to his family, and, for the sake of expediency, opted for an open carriage. When the horses of his carriage ran out of control at Sablonville in the Hauts-de-Seine département, he lost his balance and fractured his skull, and, despite the best attentions of his doctors, the 31-year-old Duke died some hours later, surrounded by family members who had rushed to the scene. Alfred de Musset evoked the accident in his poem Le Treize Juillet (in the collection Poésies nouvelles).

Ferdinand Philippe's funeral service was held in Notre Dame which was covered not in black fabric (of which there wasn't enough) but, at the suggestion of the architect Visconti, black paper. He was interred in an elaborate tomb in the Chapelle Royale, in Dreux, Eure-et-Loir.

Deprived of the popular support his eldest son had had, Louis Philippe and his regime fell six years later. He, his family, and Ferdinand Philippe's widow Princess Hélène went into exile in Great Britain. There, Hélène died nearly 16 years after her husband, on 18 May 1858 in Richmond, Surrey. Because Hélène was a Protestant, she could not be buried in the Catholic Chapelle Royale at Dreux. Instead, a room with a separate entrance was built attached to the chapel and a window was opened between her tomb and her husband's. The sculpture of the Protestant princess rests atop her tomb, depicting her reaching through the opening to the tomb of her beloved Catholic prince and husband Ferdinand Philippe.

== Ancestry ==
Ancestors of Prince Ferdinand Philippe, Duke of Orléans

8. Louis Philippe I, Duke of Orléans
4. Louis Philippe II, Duke of Orléans
9. Louise Henriette de Bourbon
2. Louis Philippe I of France
10. Louis Jean Marie, Duke of Penthièvre
5. Louise Marie Adélaïde de Bourbon
11. Maria Teresa Felicitas d'Este
1. Prince Ferdinand Philippe, Duke of Orléans
12. Charles III of Spain
6. Ferdinand I of the Two Sicilies
13. Maria Amalia of Saxony
3. Maria Amalia of Naples and Sicily
14. Francis I, Holy Roman Emperor
7. Maria Carolina of Austria
15. Maria Theresa of Austria

== Honours ==
- Kingdom of France: Knight of the Holy Spirit, 30 May 1825
- Belgium: Grand Cordon of the Order of Leopold, 10 March 1833
- Two Sicilies:
  - Knight of St. Januarius
  - Grand Cross of St. Ferdinand and Merit
- Spain: Knight of the Golden Fleece, 1 July 1837
- Kingdom of Portugal: Grand Cross of the Tower and Sword

== In fiction ==
- Ferdinand-Philippe was used by Hanns Heinz Ewers as a character in his novella "Die Herzen der Könige" (The Hearts of the Kings).

== Sources ==
- (in French) Guy Antonetti, Louis-Philippe, Paris, Librairie Arthème Fayard, 2002 ISBN 2-213-59222-5
- Mullié, Charles (1852). "Orléans (Ferdinand-Philippe-Louis-Charles-Henri-Joseph) de Bourbon, duc d'" . Biographie des célébrités militaires des armées de terre et de mer de 1789 à 1850 (in French). Paris: Poignavant et Compagnie.
- (in French) Ferdinand-Philippe d'Orléans, duc d'Orléans, Souvenirs 1810–1830, texte établi, annoté et présenté par Hervé Robert, Genève, Librairie Droz S.A., 1993
- (in French) Ferdinand-Philippe d'Orléans, duc d'Orléans, Lettres 1825–1842, publiées par ses fils le comte de Paris et le duc de Chartres, Paris, Calmann-Lévy, 1889

Prince Ferdinand Philippe, Duke of Orléans House of Orléans Cadet branch of the House of Bourbon Born: 3 September 1810 Died: 13 July 1842
French royalty
Preceded by Louis Philippe later became King Louis Philippe I	Heir to the Throne as Heir apparent 9 August 1830 – 13 July 1842	Succeeded by Prince Philippe, Count of Paris
Preceded by Louis Philippe later became King Louis Philippe I	Duke of Orléans; 9 August 1830 – 13 July 1842	Vacant Title next held by Prince Philippe
