= Princess Louise of Hesse-Darmstadt (1757–1830) =

Grand Duchess consort of Saxe-Weimar-Eisenach from 1815 to 1828

Louise of Hesse-Darmstadt
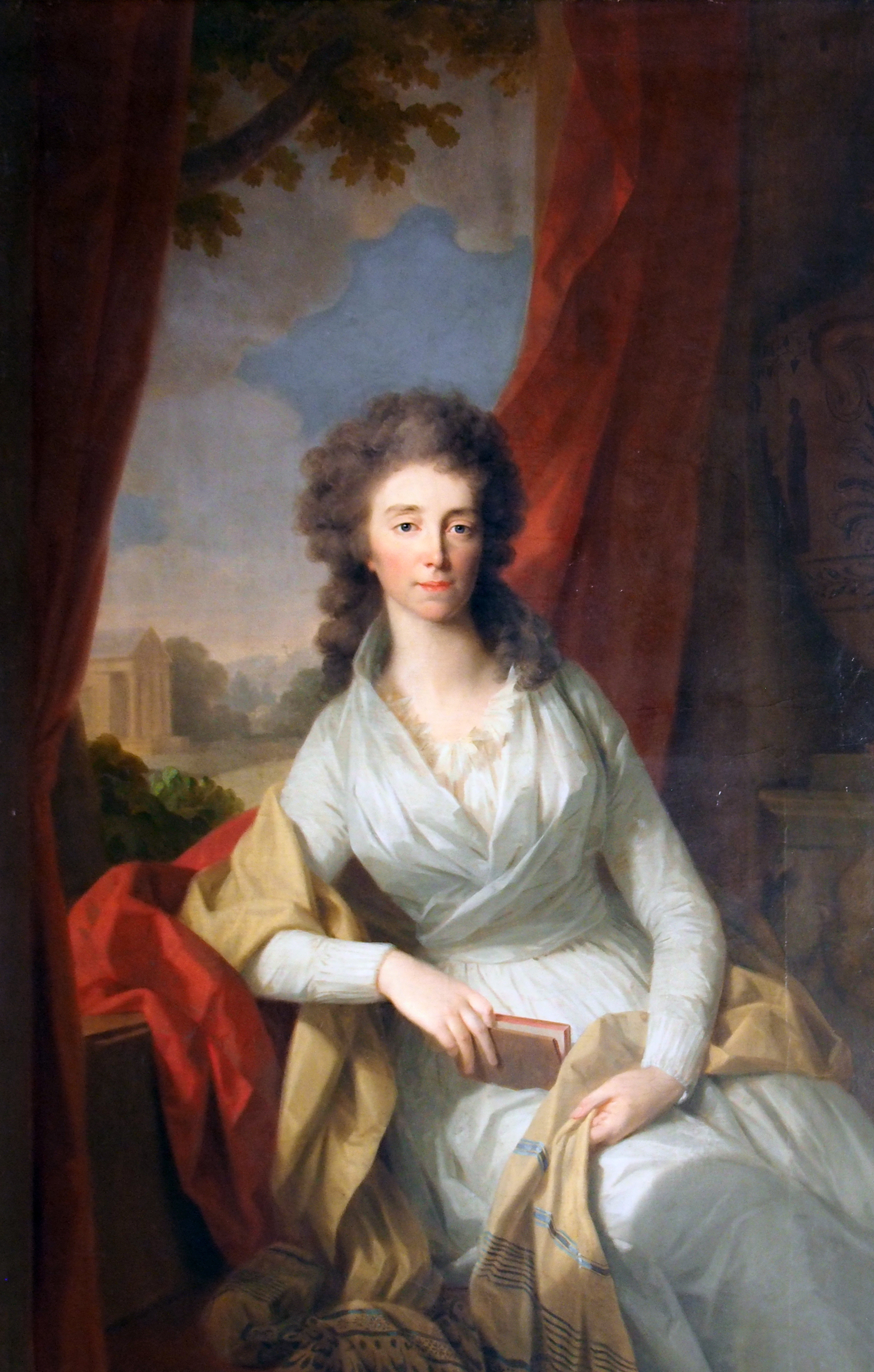
- Luise von Hessen-Darmstadt, in a painting by Johann Heinrich Wilhelm Tischbein

Grand Duchess consort of Saxe-Weimar-Eisenach
- Tenure: 21 April 1815 – 14 June 1828
- Born: 30 January 1757; Berlin
- Died: 14 February 1830 (aged 73)
- Spouse: Charles Augustus, Grand Duke of Saxe-Weimar-Eisenach (m. 1775; died 1828)
- Issue: Princess Luise; Charles Frederick, Grand Duke of Saxe-Weimar-Eisenach; Caroline Louise, Hereditary Grand Duchess of Mecklenburg-Schwerin; Prince Bernhard
Names
- Louise Auguste
- House: Hesse-Darmstadt
- Father: Louis IX, Landgrave of Hesse-Darmstadt
- Mother: Countess Palatine Caroline of Zweibrücken

Princess and Landgravine Louise of Hesse-Darmstadt (Louise Auguste; 30 January 1757 – 14 February 1830) was a German princess. She was the daughter of Louis IX, Landgrave of Hesse-Darmstadt. On 3 October 1775, she married duke (later grand duke) Charles Augustus of Saxe-Weimar-Eisenach and became a member of the court sphere of Weimar Classicism. She was held to be serious and introverted but also compassionate and sympathetic in the aftermath of the Battle of Jena which guaranteed her part in the later "myth of Weimar" ("Weimarmythos").

== Life ==
=== Early life ===
The princess belonged to the House of Darmstadt, which held the Hessian landgraviate. She was born on 30 January 1757 in Frederick II's Prussian capital, Berlin, where her parents were due to the Seven Years' War. Her father Louis IX succeeded to the landgraviate in 1768 and was at the time of her birth fighting as a general for the Prussian forces. He was thus often away from his children and so the princess's education was in her mother Caroline's hands. Caroline educated Louise in the evangelical Protestant tradition, and she became interested in literature and music.

As the youngest daughter, with eight siblings, Louise's education was important to improve her marriage prospects. Since Louis IX showed little interest in his children, it was vital to get Louise married off and a matter also in the hands of her mother, becoming known as the "great Landgräfin" and von Zweibrücken due to her expert international dynastic politics in ancien regime Europe. In 1773, Louise travelled with her mother and sisters Amalie and Wilhelmine to Beschau then to the Russian court in St Petersburg. Tsarina Catharine II decided Louise was unsuitable as a wife for the grand prince and future Tsar Paul, preferring her sister Wilhemine. This rebuff and her relationship with her future brother-in-law Paul formed Louise, leading to her being a persistent influence in the Russian state.

Nevertheless, this journey was not without influence on Louise, since on the way to Russia Caroline had learned of another female regent of a small German state – Anna Amalia. Anna and Louise probably found favour together.

=== Marriage ===
At the end of this acquaintance, under the influence of the governor in Erfurt from the Archbishopric of Mainz, Karl Theodor Anton Maria von Dalberg, the 18-year-old Louise was betrothed to the young knight Carl August of Sachsen-Weimar. The marriage occurred on 3 October 1775 at the Karlsruher court, where (as a new princess consort) Louise became caught up in the Ernestine Weimar court.

The marriage was wholly dynastic in purpose (her sisters were married off to heir to Prussia and the Tsarevitch), consolidating the duchy of Saxe-Weimar's place at the heart of the Holy Roman Empire. Primary and secondary sources agree that it was as unhappy, with Louise (noted for her delicacy and timidity) had difficulty fitting in at court and remained in the shadow of her mother-in-law, the dowager duchess Anna Amalia. Louise especially attended the convents in her new country. A Romantic avant la lettre, she did not have a taste for the Romantic lifestyle. Goethe was court poet and minister to her husband (and his companion in his extra-marital affairs), but was moved by her charm, noble-heartedness and her eyes "the colour of cornflowers". Taking her under his wing, Goethe dedicated the following words to her:

I know one, thin as the lily / Whose pride is only innocence. / No one – not even Solomon – ever saw her like.
(J'en sais une, mince comme lys/ Dont la fierté n'est qu'innocence./ Nul – pas même Salomon – n'en vit de pareille.)

After four years of marriage, in 1779, Louise finally gave birth her first child, who was not the hoped-for male heir but a daughter; named after her mother, she lived for only five years. Louise's next pregnancy, in 1781, produced a second daughter who died immediately after birth. At this time, the Weimar ducal court also went through its sturm und drang phase, drawing not only Goethe but also the Ernestines from Miseleien and Eseleien. The resulting emotional coldness did not help their marriage, with her husband publicly humiliating the marriage by a long-term affair with the actress Karoline Jagemann. Louise only gave him the heir in 1783, with the birth of Charles Frederick; after him, followed four more children, of whom two survived infancy: Caroline Louise in 1786 and Bernhard in 1792. With the birth of Bernhard the marriage had finally served its purpose of guaranteeing the succession to the throne and the continuation of the dynasty. Charles Frederick later married Maria (sister of Alexander I of Russia), and their daughter Augusta of Saxe-Weimar married prince Wilhelm of Prussia, thus becoming the first empress of Germany.

=== Napoleonic Wars ===
Louise had her great moment in October 1806. Despite her childhood and her early experiences in Weimar, she was a great influence in literary circles. The battle of Jena-Auerstedt (14 October), led to the defeat of the Prussian-Saxon forces and the total submission of all the German states to France and precipitated the fall of the Holy Roman Empire. Soon after the battle, the victorious French troops advanced on Weimar. The other family members either fled or were away fighting in the Prussian forces, and so Louise remained in Weimar as mother and protector of the nation.

Two days after the battle, she ended up opposing Napoleon himself. He insisted that her husband withdraw from Prussian military service but she quite undiplomatically made it clear to Napoleon that he could not do so. Nevertheless, at her husband's request and inspired by the example of the German patriot queen Louise of Prussia, she managed to arrange the French plundering of the area so that Weimar got off lightly compared to the university-city of Jena. Whether Napoleon let himself soften towards Louise, or whether he acted this way due to his own calculations in power-politics remains open to discussion. The Saxe-Weimar-Eisenach duchy remained with the alliance upon the Treaty of Poznań and survived the Napoleonic era via further politicking. Since Louise was now considered as the country's leader, and her subjects and contemporaries maintained this image of her – along with her part in the Weimar myth.

In 1815, her politicking during the war ensured that at the Congress of Vienna her husband's small duchy not only retained all its territory but rose to become a grand duchy (her Thuringian cousins the house of Saxony, in contrast, merely preserved their title of duke). She then became devoted to ambassadorial duties. The Russian alliance ended with her successor Maria Pavlovna. The jubilee of her rule and her golden wedding, both in 1825, passed with little celebration and – already very withdrawn – she died aged 73 on 14 February 1830.

== Issue ==
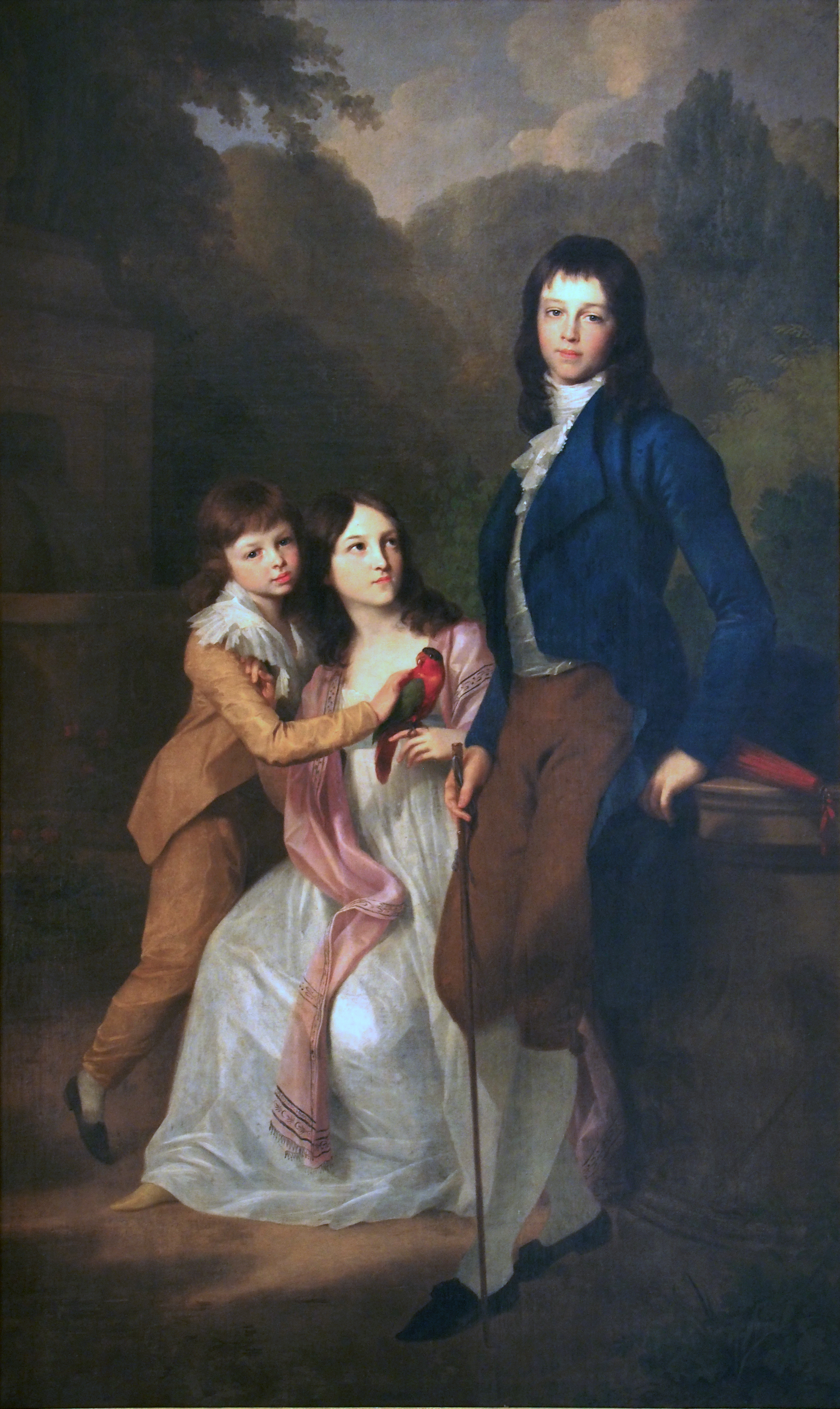
The children of Charles Augustus and Louise's: Charles Frederick, Caroline Louise and Bernhard. Portrait by Johann Friedrich August Tischbein, 1798.

She and Charles Augustus had 7 children, of whom only three survive to adulthood:

- Louise Auguste Amalie (Weimar, 3 February 1779 – Weimar, 24 March 1784).
- A daughter (born and died Weimar, 10 September 1781).
- Charles Frederick, Grand Duke of Saxe-Weimar-Eisenach (Weimar, 2 February 1783 – Schloss Belvedere, Weimar, 8 July 1853).
- A son (born and died Weimar, 26 February 1785).
- Caroline Louise (Weimar, 18 July 1786 – Ludwigslust, 20 January 1816), married Hereditary Prince Frederick Louis of Mecklenburg-Schwerin.
- A son (born and died, Weimar, 13 April 1789).
- Charles Bernhard (Weimar, 30 May 1792 – Liebenstein, 31 July 1862).

== Archives ==
Louise's letters to her parents, grandmother and other persons, written between 1760 and 1776, are preserved in the Hessian State Archive (Hessisches Staatsarchiv Darmstadt) in Darmstadt, Germany.

== Ancestry ==
Ancestors of Princess Louise of Hesse-Darmstadt (1757–1830)

8. Ernest Louis, Landgrave of Hesse-Darmstadt
4. Louis VIII, Landgrave of Hesse-Darmstadt
9. Dorothea Charlotte of Brandenburg-Ansbach
2. Louis IX, Landgrave of Hesse-Darmstadt
10. Johann Reinhard III of Hanau-Lichtenberg
5. Countess Charlotte of Hanau-Lichtenberg
11. Dorothea Friederike of Brandenburg-Ansbach
1. Princess Louise Auguste of Hesse-Darmstadt
12. Christian II of Zweibrücken-Birkenfeld
6. Christian III, Count Palatine of Zweibrücken
13. Katharina Agathe of Rappoltstein
3. Countess Palatine Caroline of Zweibrücken
14. Louis Crato, Count of Nassau-Saarbrücken
7. Caroline of Nassau-Saarbrücken
15. Philippine Henriette of Hohenlohe-Langenburg

== Bibliography ==
- (in German) Bornhak, Friederike: Aus Alt-Weimar. Die Großherzoginnen Luise und Maria Paulowna, Breslau 1908.
- (in German) Hammerich, Louis Leonor: Zwei kleine Goethestudien. II. Grossherzogin Louise von Sachsen-Weimar – eine politische, keine schöne Seele, Kopenhagen 1962.
- (in German) Taxis-Bordogna, Olga: Frauen von Weimar, München 1950.

Princess Louise of Hesse-Darmstadt (1757–1830) House of Hesse-Darmstadt Cadet branch of the House of Hesse Born: 30 January 1757 Died: 14 February 1830
German royalty
Vacant Title last held by Anna Amalia of Brunswick-Wolfenbüttel	Duchess consort of Saxe-Weimar; 3 October 1775 – 1809	Merged into one State
Vacant Title last held by Anna Amalia of Brunswick-Wolfenbüttel	Duchess consort of Saxe-Eisenach; 3 October 1775 – 1809	Merged into one State
New title	Duchess consort of Saxe-Weimar-Eisenach; 1809 – 21 April 1815	Title Abolished
New title	Grand Duchess consort of Saxe-Weimar-Eisenach; 21 April 1815 – 14 June 1828	Succeeded by Maria Pavlovna of Russia
