= Jakob Wilhelm Roux =

German painter and draughtsman (1771–1830)

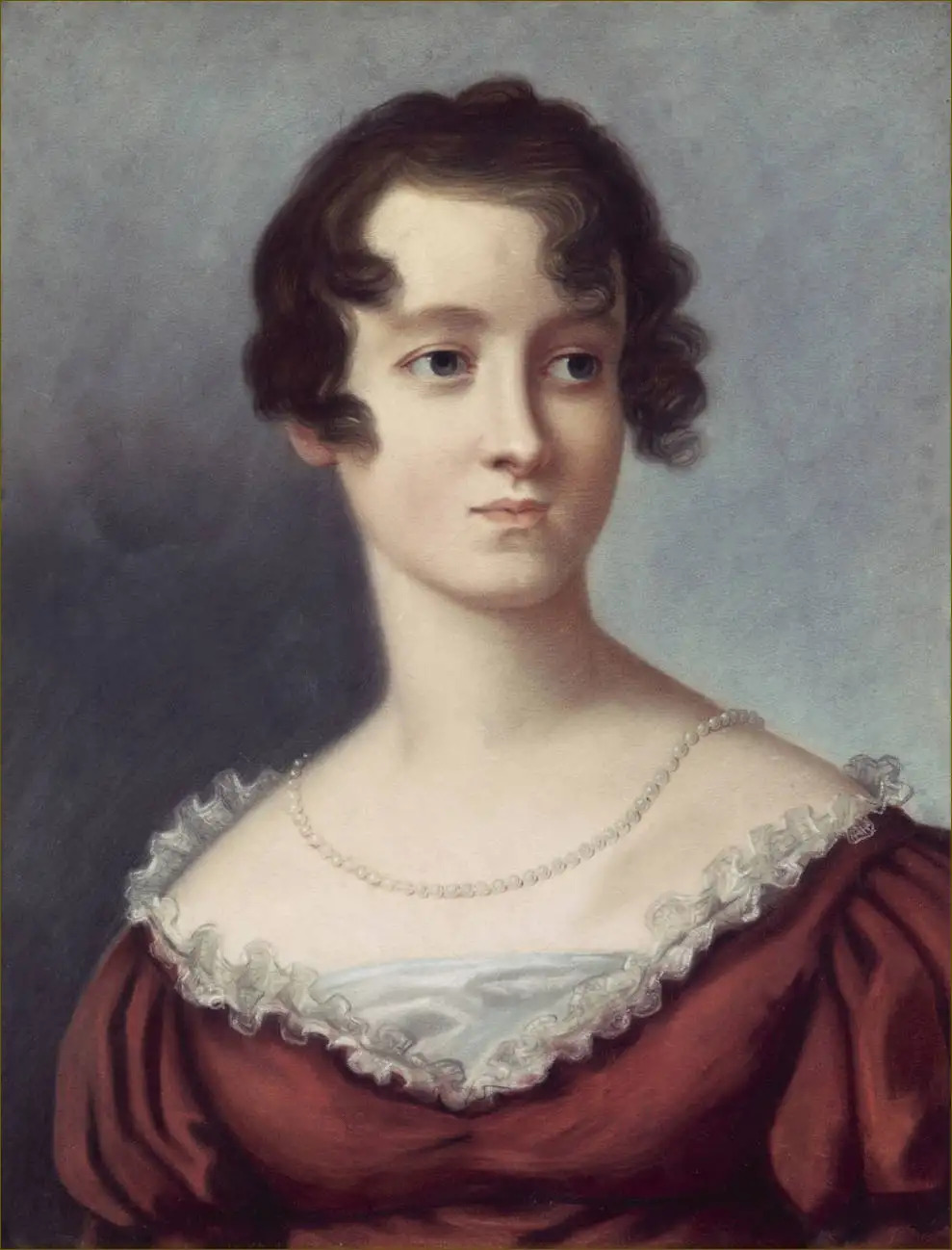
Princess Karoline Luise of Saxe-Weimar-Eisenach by Jakob Wilhelm Roux, c. 1810

Jakob Wilhelm Christian Roux (13 April 1771 – 22 August 1830) was a German painter and draughtsman. He became famous initially for his anatomical drawings but later shifted to portraits and landscapes. He also worked at the intersection of art and science, collaborating with Goethe on the theory of colour and examining coloring materials used in ancient Egypt and Rome.

== Life and work ==
Roux was born in Jena to a Huguenot family. His father Heinrich Friedrich (1728–91) was a fencing master and teacher of French at the University of Jena. His mother Johanna Magdalena née Bittermann (1741–1821) was the daughter of a master shoemaker. He studied mathematics for a time at the University of Jena from 1791. He also studied anatomy and took drawing lessons under Christian Immanuel Oehme (1759–1832) where his interests and classes turned to the arts. It was while studying there that he met the surgeon Justus Christian Loder, with whom he collaborated. Roux did a number of anatomical illustrations for Loder's Tabulae anatomicae. Roux became famous for his anatomical works which brought him in contact with Johann Wolfgang Goethe and Friedrich Justin Bertuch. After training in landscape art under Johann Christian Klengel at Dresden, he became more involved in painting portraits and landscapes. In 1817, he worked with Goethe on experiments in colour perception. In 1818 he became an art teacher for the princesses Marie and Augusta of Saxony-Weimar-Eisenach. A newly created school of art in Jena was entrusted to his directorship but he moved out of this to become a professor of anatomical drawing at the University of Heidelberg. He worked on a physical theory of colour based on Goethe's ideas which was contrary to Newton's ideas. He also examined the chemistry of colouring materials used in ancient Rome and Egypt. Louise Seidler (1786–1866) was one of his students.

He was first married in 1801 to Pauline Johanna Heyligenstädt, and they had two daughters and a son together. Two years after she died in 1823, Roux remarried to Charlotte Mariana Wippermann. They had two sons together. Roux died in Heidelberg in 1830.

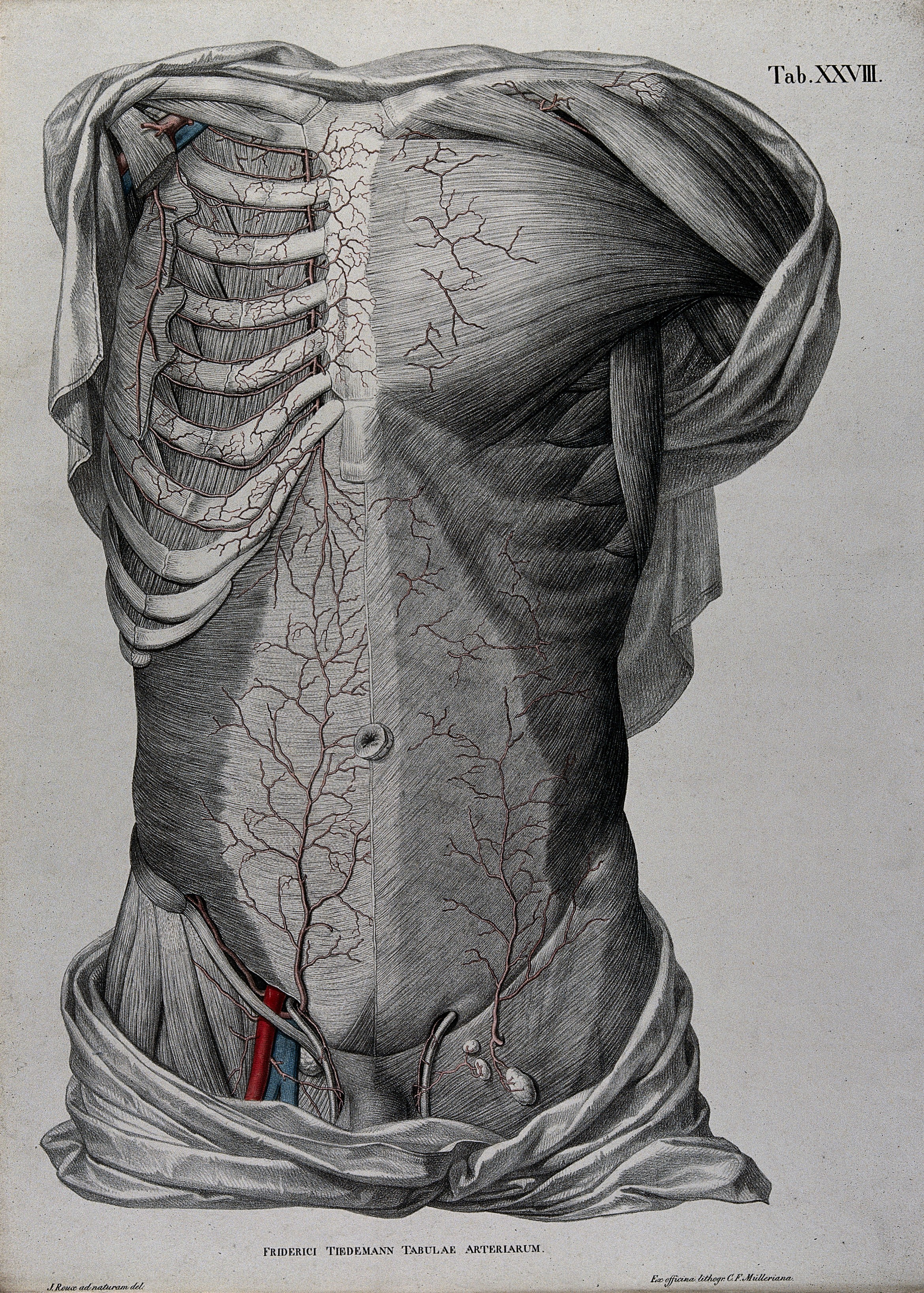
Anatomical illustration

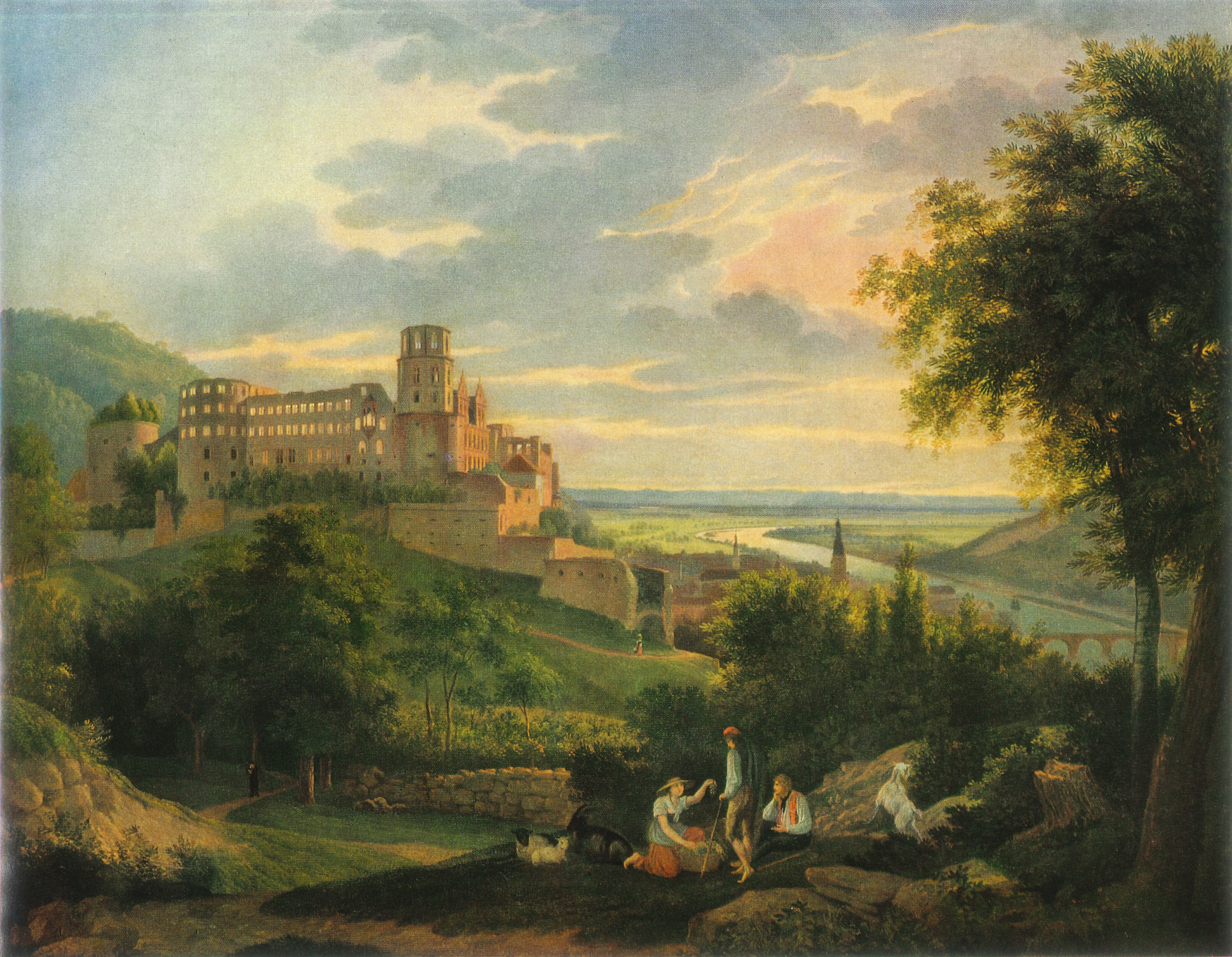
Heidelberg landscape
