= Frederick Louis, Hereditary Grand Duke of Mecklenburg-Schwerin =

Frederick Louis
- Hereditary Grand Duke of Mecklenburg-Schwerin
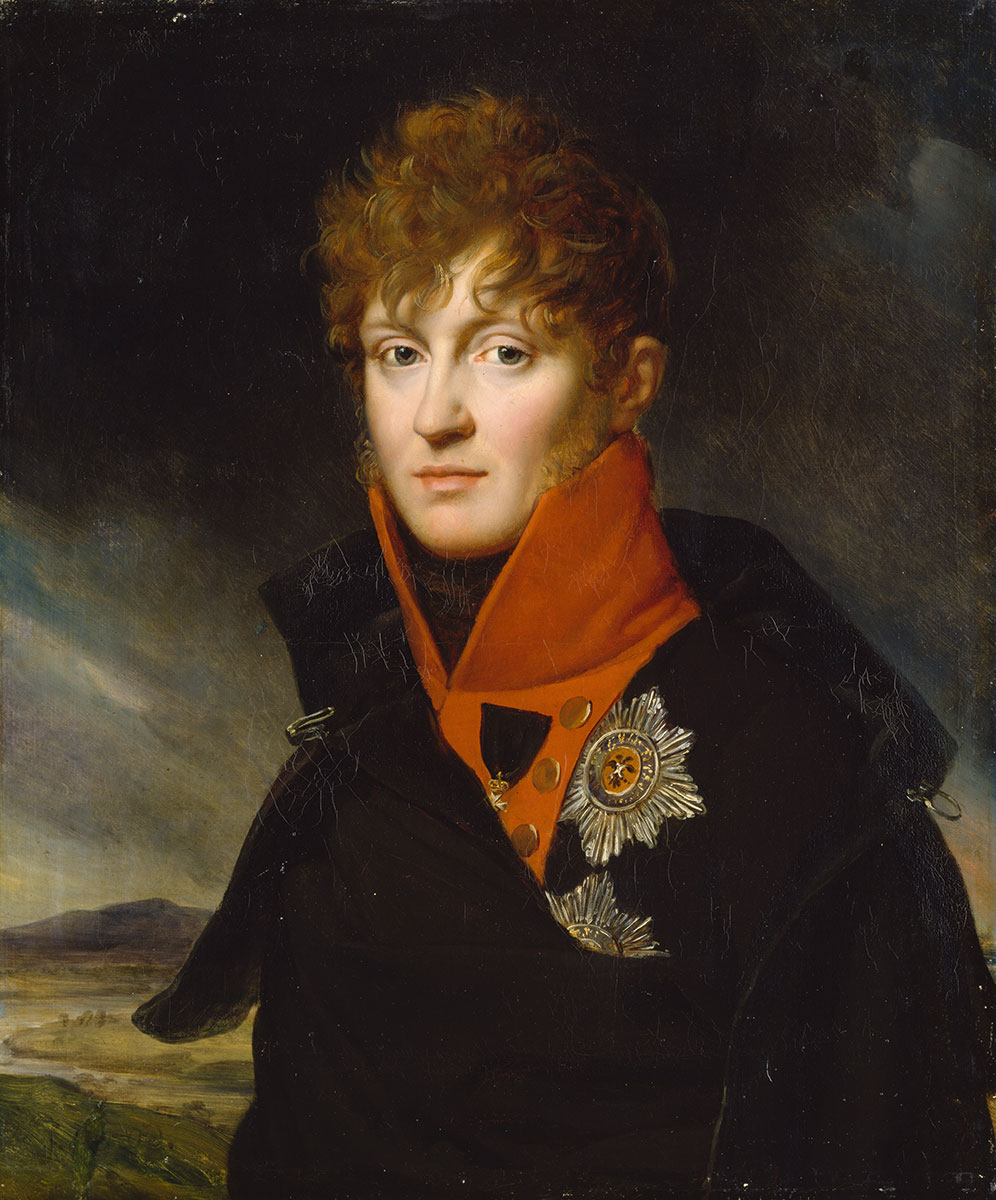
- Portrait by François Gérard, 1807
- Born: 13 June 1778; Ludwigslust, Mecklenburg-Schwerin
- Died: 29 November 1819 (aged 41); Ludwigslust, Mecklenburg-Schwerin
- Spouse: Grand Duchess Elena Pavlovna of Russia (m. 1799; died 1803) Princess Caroline Louise of Saxe-Weimar-Eisenach (m. 1810; died 1816) Landgravine Auguste of Hesse-Homburg (m. 1818)
- Issue: Paul Frederick, Grand Duke of Mecklenburg-Schwerin; Marie Louise, Duchess of Saxe-Altenburg; Albert of Mecklenburg-Schwerin; Helene, Duchess of Orléans; Magnus of Mecklenburg-Schwerin
Names
- German: Friedrich Ludwig
- House: Mecklenburg-Schwerin
- Father: Frederick Francis I, Grand Duke of Mecklenburg-Schwerin
- Mother: Princess Louise of Saxe-Gotha-Altenburg
- Religion: Lutheranism

Frederick Louis of Mecklenburg-Schwerin (13 June 1778 – 29 November 1819) was a hereditary prince of the Grand Duchy of Mecklenburg-Schwerin, one of the constituent states of the German Confederation. He was the son of Frederick Francis I, Grand Duke of Mecklenburg-Schwerin, and Princess Louise of Saxe-Gotha-Altenburg.

== Marriages and issue ==
Frederick Louis married three times, and all three of his marriages proved happy. At Gatchina near Saint Petersburg) on 12 October 1799 (Old Style - 23 October), he married Grand Duchess Elena Pavlovna of Russia, daughter of Tsar Paul I of Russia, who incidentally died only five months later. Among Elena's siblings were Tsar Alexander I, the future Tsar Nicholas I, and a future queen of the Netherlands. The couple had two children:

1. Paul Frederick of Mecklenburg-Schwerin (1800–1842) Grand Duke of Mecklenburg-Schwerin, who in 1822 married Princess Alexandrine of Prussia (1803–1892), daughter of Frederick William III of Prussia
2. Marie of Mecklenburg-Schwerin (1803–1862), who in 1825 married Georg, Duke of Saxe-Altenburg, first cousin of her sister-in-law Alexandrine.

Elena died in 1803. Seven years later, in 1810, Frederick married Princess Caroline Louise of Saxe-Weimar-Eisenach, daughter of Charles Augustus, Grand Duke of Saxe-Weimar-Eisenach. They had three children:

1. Albert of Mecklenburg-Schwerin (1812–1834)
2. Hélène of Mecklenburg-Schwerin (1814–1858), who in 1837 married Prince Ferdinand Philippe, Duke of Orléans (1810–1842) eldest son of Louis Philippe I, King of the French
3. Magnus of Mecklenburg-Schwerin (1815–1816)

Caroline died in 1816 aged 29. On her deathbed, anxious for the future of her children, she enjoined her husband to marry her first cousin (her mother's sister's daughter) Princess Auguste, daughter of Frederick V, Landgrave of Hesse-Homburg. Not long after Caroline's death, Frederick's court made known the late Landgravine's expressed wishes to her near relatives, who acted upon the matter. Princess Auguste was 40 years old, the same age as Frederick, and the prospect of mothering Caroline's infant children, as also of mentoring his teenage children by Elena, was deeply attractive to her. At the instance of her parents, she readily agreed to the proposal.

On 3 April 1818, Frederick was united in marriage to 41-year-old Princess Auguste. Incidentally, four days later, on 7 April, Auguste's brother Frederick married Princess Elizabeth of the United Kingdom, daughter of George III. Both of these marriages, featuring middle-aged couples, proved childless but extremely happy.

Frederick and Auguste did not have children but were happy together during 19 months that providence granted them with each other. Frederick died on 29 November 1819. It soon became evident that Caroline had judged her cousin well and had made an inspired choice. Auguste never remarried, remained in Mecklenburg-Schwerin for the rest of her life, and devoted herself to the care of her stepchildren. She had close and loving bonds with all four of them, but particularly with the youngest, Helene, whom she raised from the age of 4. However, Landgravine Auguste was destined to outlive all four of her beloved stepchildren. She died in 1871 aged 94.

Frederick was buried at the Helena Paulovna Mausoleum. All three of his wives lie buried beside him.

=== Descendants ===
Among Friedrich Louis's descendants are:

- King Willem-Alexander of the Netherlands;
- Queen Margrethe II of Denmark;
- Queen Anne-Marie of Greece;
- King Felipe VI of Spain;
- Queen Anne of Romania;
- Jean, Count of Paris, pretender to the French throne;
- Carlos, Duke of Parma;
- Gustav, 7th Prince of Sayn-Wittgenstein-Berleburg;
- Maria Vladimirovna, Grand Duchess of Russia;
- Georg Friedrich, Prince of Prussia;
- Guglielmo Plüschow and Gunther Plüschow, descendants of Frederick's illegitimate son Carl Eduard Plüschow

== Ancestry ==
Ancestors of Frederick Louis, Hereditary Grand Duke of Mecklenburg-Schwerin

8. Christian Ludwig II, Duke of Mecklenburg
4. Duke Louis of Mecklenburg-Schwerin
9. Gustave Caroline of Mecklenburg-Strelitz
2. Frederick Francis I, Grand Duke of Mecklenburg
10. Francis Josias, Duke of Saxe-Coburg-Saalfeld
5. Princess Charlotte Sophie of Saxe-Coburg-Saalfeld
11. Princess Anna Sophie of Schwarzburg-Rudolstadt
1. Frederick Louis, Hereditary Grand Duke of Mecklenburg-Schwerin
12. Frederick II, Duke of Saxe-Gotha-Altenburg
6. Prince John August of Saxe-Gotha-Altenburg
13. Princess Magdalena Augusta of Anhalt-Zerbst
3. Louise of Saxe-Gotha-Altenburg
14. Heinrich I, Count Reuss of Schleiz
7. Countess Louise Reuss of Schleiz
15. Countess Juliana Dorothea Louise of Löwenstein-Wertheim-Virneburg
