= Duchess Helene of Mecklenburg-Schwerin =

- Duchess of Orléans; Princess Royal of France
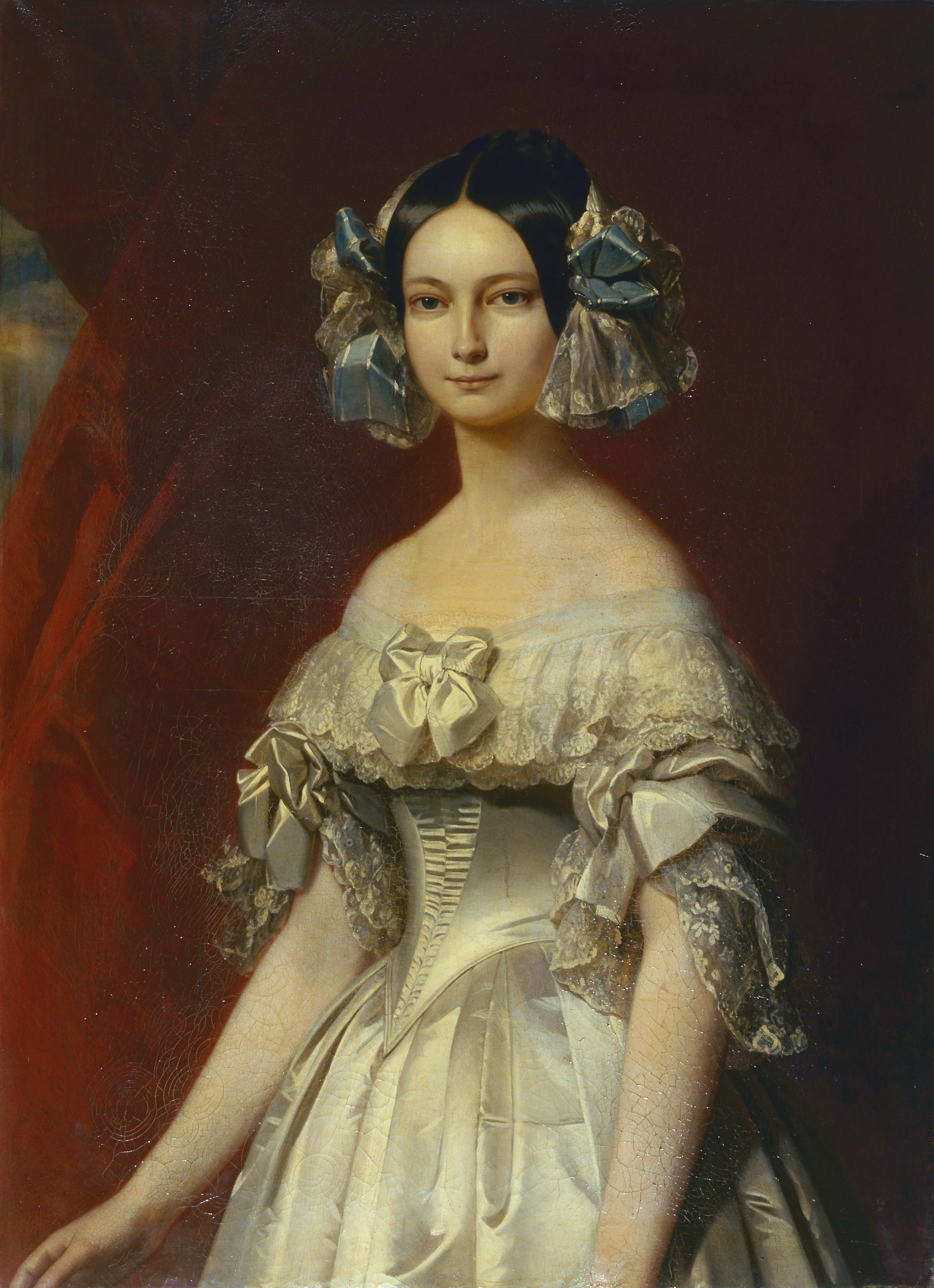
- Portrait by Franz Xaver Winterhalter
- Born: 24 January 1814; Schloss Ludwigslust, Duchy of Mecklenburg-Schwerin
- Died: 17 May 1858 (aged 44); Richmond upon Thames, London, England, United Kingdom
- Burial: Chapelle royale de Dreux
- Spouse: Prince Ferdinand Philippe, Duke of Orléans (m. 1837; died 1842)
- Issue Detail: Prince Philippe, Count of Paris; Prince Robert, Duke of Chartres
Names
- Helene Luise Elisabeth
- House: Mecklenburg-Schwerin
- Father: Frederick Louis, Hereditary Grand Duke of Mecklenburg-Schwerin
- Mother: Princess Caroline Louise of Saxe-Weimar-Eisenach

Duchess Helene of Mecklenburg-Schwerin (Helene Luise Elisabeth; 24 January 1814 – 17 May 1858) was a French Crown Princess after her marriage in 1837 to the eldest son of Louis Philippe I. She is known as the mother of the future Count of Paris and Duke of Chartres.

Her descendants include present-day pretenders to the throne of France, Romania and Italy, and the kings of Spain and Belgium.

== Biography ==
=== Early life and family ===
Born at the Schloss Ludwigslust, the retreat from the capital of her native Mecklenburg-Schwerin, she was the only daughter born to the Hereditary Grand Duke of Mecklenburg-Schwerin and his second wife Princess Karoline Luise of Saxe-Weimar-Eisenach, third daughter of Grand Duke Carl August and Princess Louise of Hesse-Darmstadt. Via her father she was granddaughter of Frederick Francis I, Grand Duke of Mecklenburg-Schwerin and his wife Princess Louise of Saxe-Gotha-Altenburg. She was also indirectly related to Frederick William III of Prussia (first cousin once removed, also her half-brother married Frederick William III's daughter). On her paternal side she was a cousin of the Duchess of Kent as well as Leopold I of Belgium. Maternal cousins included the then Queen of Prussia as well as the King of Württemberg.

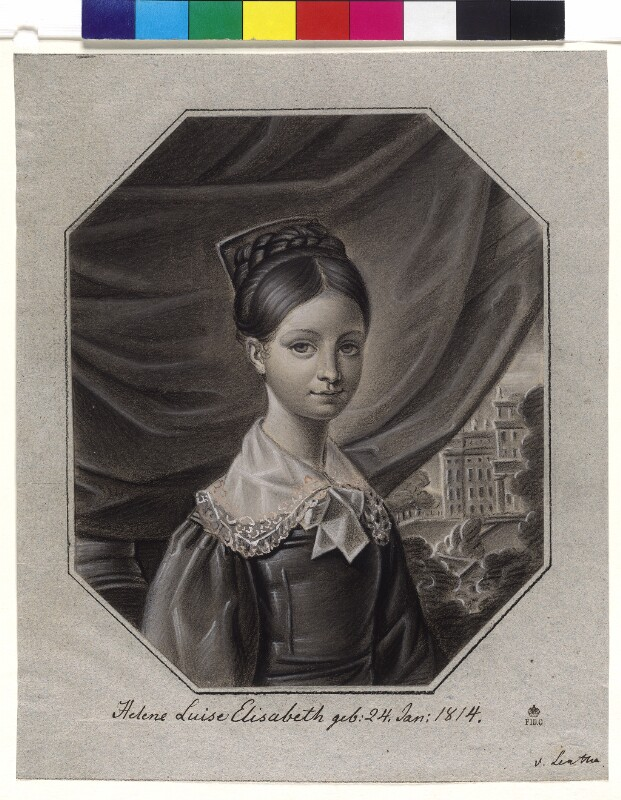
Helene in her earlier years. Pastel by Friedrich Christoph Georg Lenthe, heightening in opaque colours; made in 1828 according to his own design, mounted on gray backing paper

Her father was the eldest son and heir of Frederick Francis I, Grand Duke of Mecklenburg. Her mother was a princess of Duchy of Saxe-Weimar-Eisenach. The Hereditary Grand Duke and his wife died within three years of each other. Helene's mother died in January 1816 and her father then died in 1819, leaving her older half brother Paul Frederick of Mecklenburg-Schwerin, the new Hereditary Grand Duke, and her other siblings to be raised by her grandfather, the reigning Grand Duke.

=== Marriage ===
On 30 May 1837 Helene Luise married Ferdinand Philippe d'Orléans at the Palace of Fontainebleau. The Archbishop of Paris Hyacinthe-Louis de Quélen had used the pretext of religious differences to forbid it taking place in Notre Dame de Paris. She was chosen as the bride for the Duke to form an alliance with her cousin Frederick William III of Prussia, despite the fact that she was a Protestant and that she was considered to be a liberal, and not considered a beauty: described as an ambitious person, she accepted the proposal against the will of her family because she wanted to become a queen.

Her husband was the eldest son of king Louis Philippe I and his Italian consort, Queen Maria Amalia. For the Duke of Orléans, it was a convenient alliance but one without much attraction – Metternich remarked that she was "Petite but of a good house".

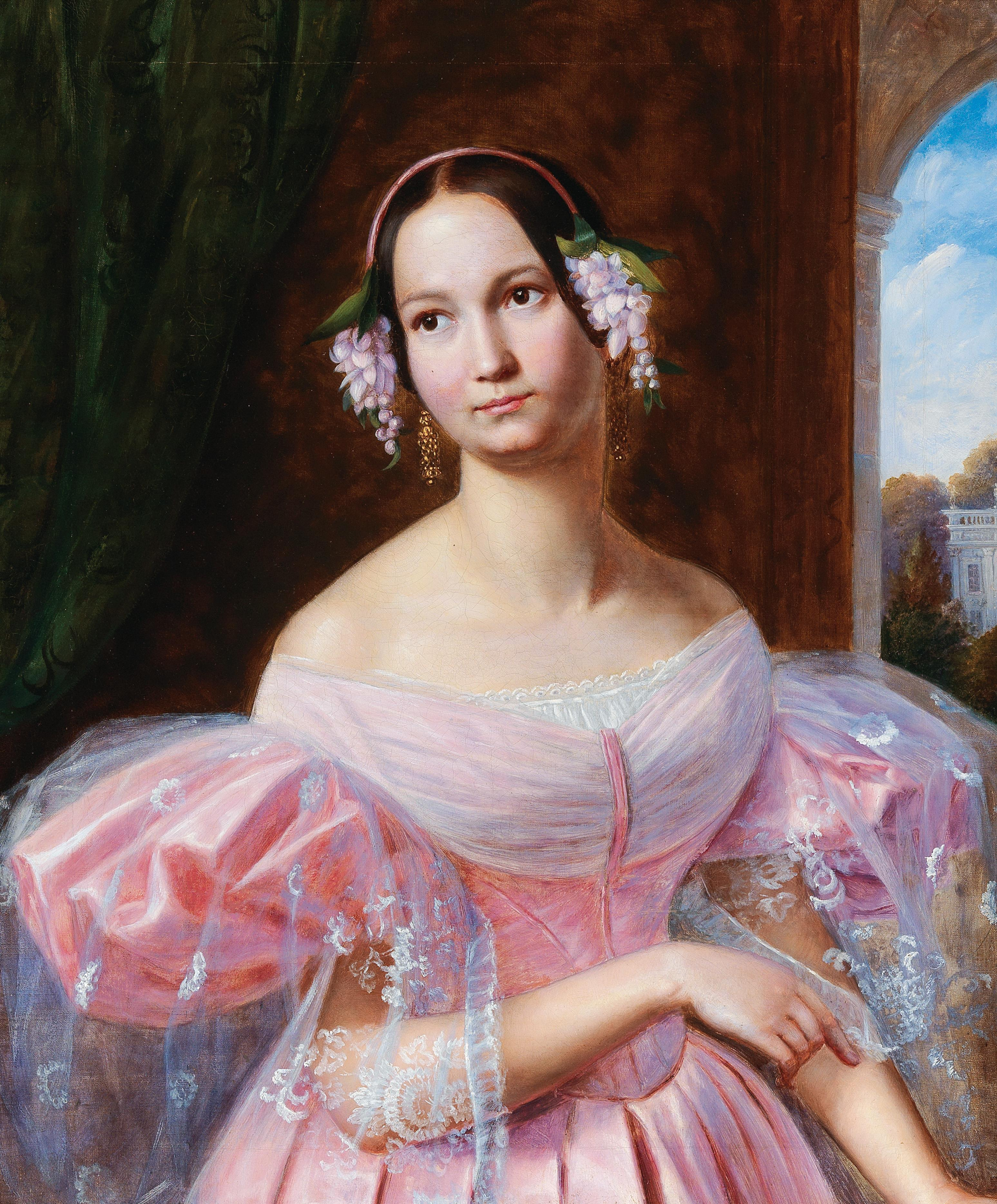
Portrait of Princess Helene as a bride (attributed to Gaston Lenthe, c. 1837)

The marriage was described as happy, and it was mostly the Queen who opposed her as a Protestant and a liberal. She became popular with the public by her introduction of the German Christmas tree in France. The couple had two children in quick succession. Their eldest Philippe, born at the Palais des Tuileries in Paris, would later be hailed as Louis Philippe II by Royalists. Their other son Robert fought for the Union in the American Civil War, and then for France in the 1870 Franco-Prussian War.

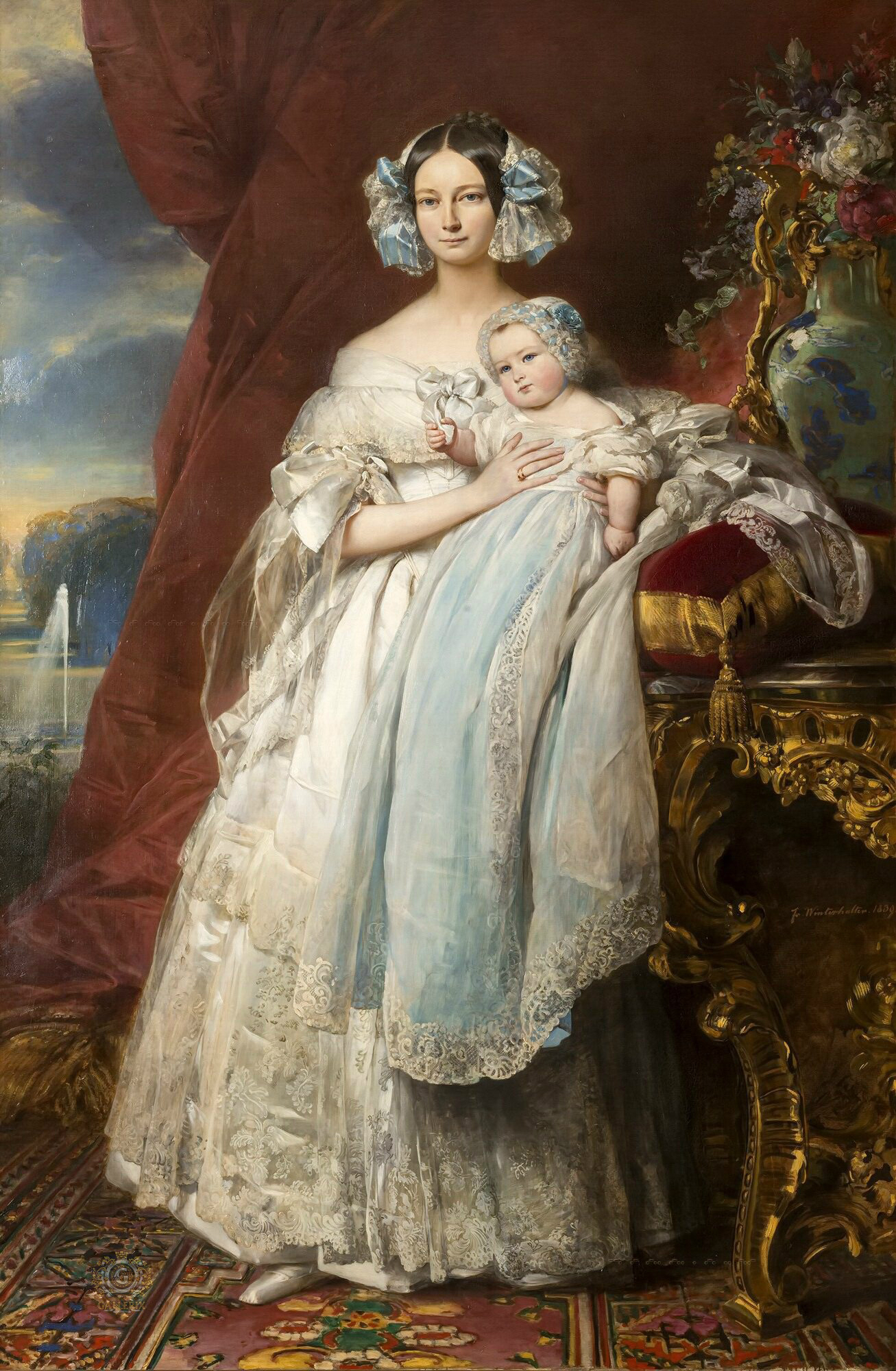
Portrait of Helene with her son Prince Philippe (by Franz Xaver Winterhalter, 1839)

A lithograph depicting Helene appeared at the French parliament with her two sons on February 24, 1848 while the Revolutionaries were storming in the chamber.

On 13 July 1842, her husband died from injuries sustained after jumping from an out of control carriage. His untimely death sparked a debate within the House of Orléans over the establishment of a regency council which would be necessary should Louis Philippe I die while his heir was still in infancy. The main contenders were Ferdinand Philippe's widow and his brother Louis, Duke of Nemours, but further developments meant that the regency did not in the end materialise. In the French Revolution of 1848, her father-in-law was deposed. Helene planned to prevent the abolition of the monarchy and be proclaimed as regent for her young son. Louis, Duke of Nemours, resigned his right to act as regent for her son to Helene and Helene appeared at the French parliament with her two sons; the Count of Paris and her younger son the Duke of Chartres, to claim her son's right to the throne and to be installed as his regent during his minority. This claim, however, was not accepted by the parliament. After failing to seize power, she left France for Germany with her children. Helene continued to actively claim the rights of her son to be the monarch of France from abroad, but the French royalists at home began to favour the other formerly reigning French royal line under the headship of the Count of Chambord instead.

=== Death ===
Helene died of a flu in Richmond; she passed the illness onto her son Robert who was staying with her at the time but he survived and continued to fight in the Wars of Italian Unification.

She was initially buried at Weybridge before being transported to the Chapelle royale de Dreux in Dreux in 1876. Because Hélène was a Protestant, she could not be buried inside the chapel. Instead, a room with a separate entrance was built attached to the chapel and a window was opened between her tomb and her husband's. The sculpture of the Protestant princess rests atop her tomb, depicting her reaching through the opening to the tomb of her beloved Catholic prince and husband Ferdinand Philippe.

== Children ==
Children of Helene Luise Elisabeth

Name	Photograph	Lifespan	Notes
Louis Philippe Albert d’Orléans; Count of Paris		24 August 1838 – 8 September 1894	Married Princess Marie Isabelle of Orléans; had issue. Louis Philippe is known as Louis Philippe II, though he was never officially proclaimed as such.
Robert Philippe Louis Eugène Ferdinand of Orléans; Duke of Chartres		9 November 1840 – 5 December 1910	Married Princess Françoise of Orléans; had issue.

== Ancestors ==
Ancestors of Duchess Helene of Mecklenburg-Schwerin

8. Duke Louis of Mecklenburg-Schwerin
4. Frederick Francis I, Grand Duke of Mecklenburg-Schwerin
9. Princess Charlotte Sophie of Saxe-Coburg-Saalfeld
2. Frederick Louis, Hereditary Grand Duke of Mecklenburg-Schwerin
10. Prince John August of Saxe-Gotha-Altenburg
5. Princess Louise of Saxe-Gotha-Altenburg
11. Countess Louise Reuss of Schleiz
1. Duchess Helene of Mecklenburg-Schwerin
12. Ernest Augustus II, Duke of Saxe-Weimar-Eisenach
6. Charles Augustus, Grand Duke of Saxe-Weimar-Eisenach
13. Anna Amalia of Brunswick-Wolfenbüttel
3. Princess Karoline Luise of Saxe-Weimar-Eisenach
14. Louis IX, Landgrave of Hesse-Darmstadt
7. Princess Louise of Hesse-Darmstadt
15. Countess Palatine Caroline of Zweibrücken

== Gallery ==
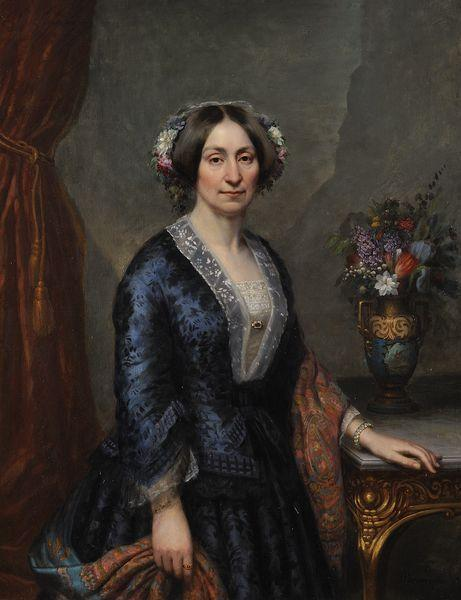
Helene in her later years (portrait by Heinrich Pommerencke, c. 1850)

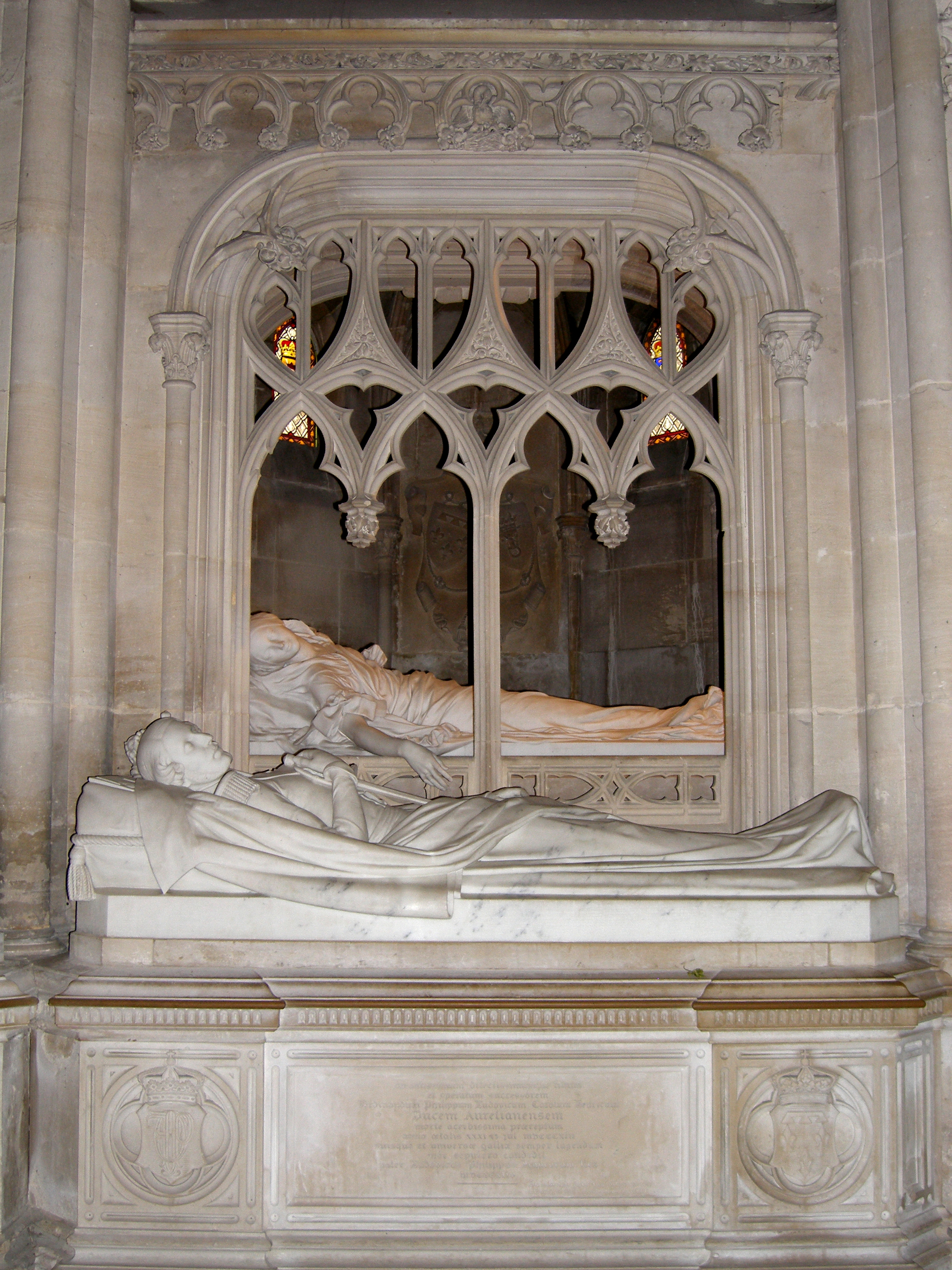
Tomb effegies of the Duke of Orleans and his wife, Chapelle Royale at Dreux.

== Bibliography ==
- (in French) Généalogie des rois et des princes, by Jean-Charles Volkmann. Edit: Jean-Paul Gisserot (1998)
- (in French) Les Orléans, une famille en guête d’un trône Les Orléans, by Georges Poisson Perrin (1999)
- (in French) Hélène de Mecklembourg-Schwerin; Madame la duchesse d'Orléans; new edition. Paris: Michel Lévy (1859)
