= Wettin, Saxony-Anhalt =

Wettin
- Ortsteil of Wettin-Löbejün
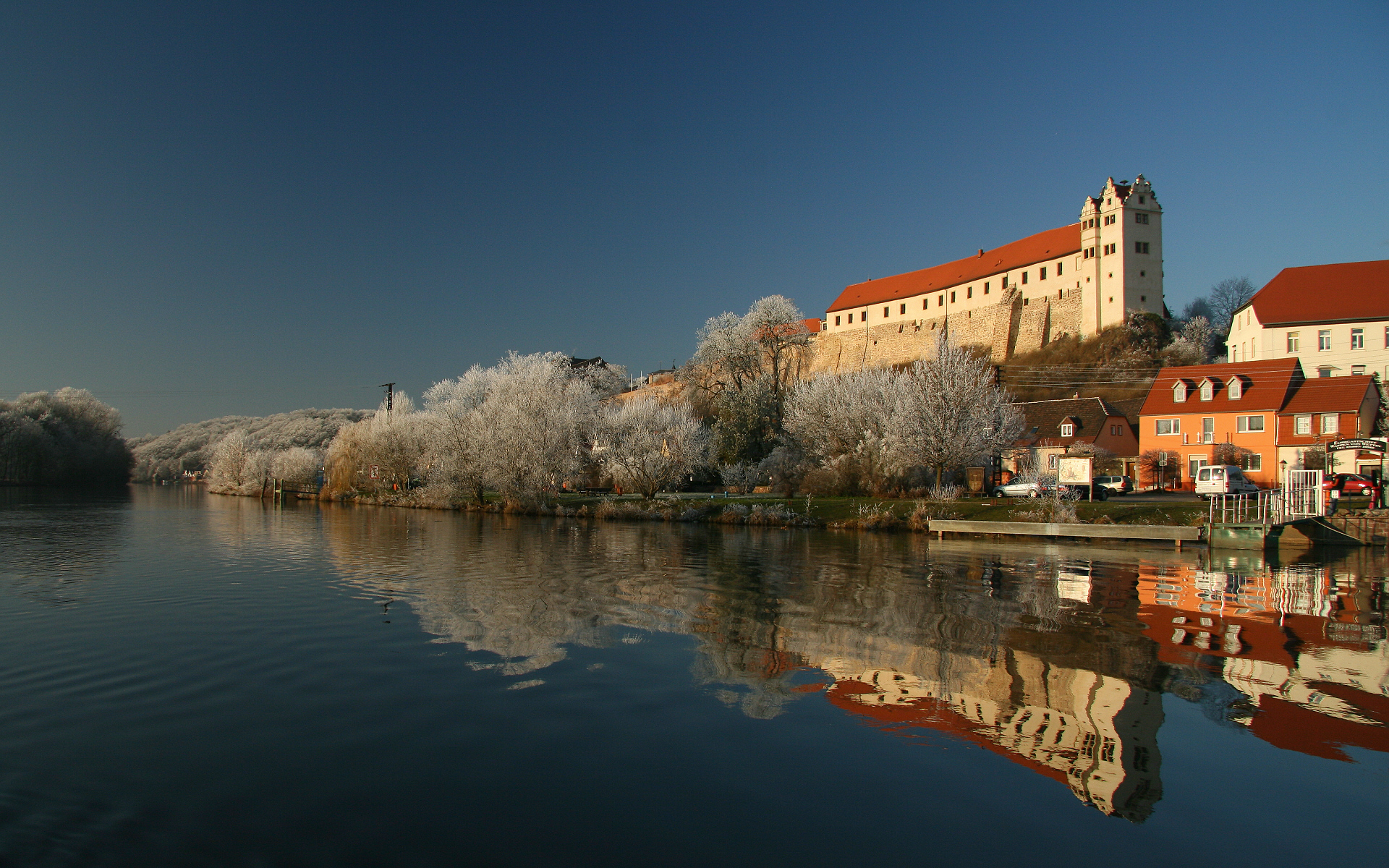
- Wettin Castle on the Saale river

- Coat of arms
- Interactive map of Wettin
- Location within Germany Location within Saxony-Anhalt
- Coordinates: 51°35′N 11°48′E
- Country: Germany
- State: Saxony-Anhalt
- District: Saalekreis
- Town: Wettin-Löbejün

Area
  - Total: 27.19 km^{2} (10.50 sq mi)
- Elevation: 73 m (240 ft)

Population (2009-12-31)
  - Total: 2,355
  - Density: 86.61/km^{2} (224.3/sq mi)
- Time zone: UTC+01:00 (CET)
  - Summer (DST): UTC+02:00 (CEST)
- Postal codes: 06193
- Dialling codes: 034607
- Vehicle registration: SK
- Website: www.wettin.de

Wettin (German pronunciation: [vɛˈtiːn]) is a small town belonging to the municipality of Wettin-Löbejün in the Saale District of Saxony-Anhalt (Saxony-Ascania), in east-central Germany. It is situated on the River Saale, just north of Halle. It is known for Wettin Castle, the ancestral seat of the House of Wettin, the former ruling dynasty of Saxony, Poland, the United Kingdom, Belgium, and Bulgaria. The town and its name are of Slavic origin.

== Geography ==
Wettin lies in the Saalekreis (Saale District) of the eastern German federal state of Saxony-Anhalt, on the river Saale, which flows into the Elbe further north. Wettin belongs to the municipality of Wettin-Löbejün which borders Saxony-Anhalt's most populous city of Halle-on-the-Saale in the southeast. It further borders Petersberg and Salzatal in the Saale District, Gerbstedt in the district of Mansfeld-Südharz (Mansfield-Southern Harz), Könnern in the Salzlandkreis (Saltland District), and Südliches Anhalt in the district of Anhalt-Bitterfeld (Ascania-Bitterfield). The Saale District, which Wettin-Löbejün is a part of, surrounds the city of Halle. The nearest international airport is Leipzig/Halle Airport in Schkeuditz, southeast of Halle. The municipality of Wettin-Löbejün further consists of the villages of Brachwitz, Döblitz, Domnitz, Gimritz, Löbejün, Nauendorf, Neutz-Lettewitz, Plötz, and Rothenburg. Most of these villages are of Slavic origin.

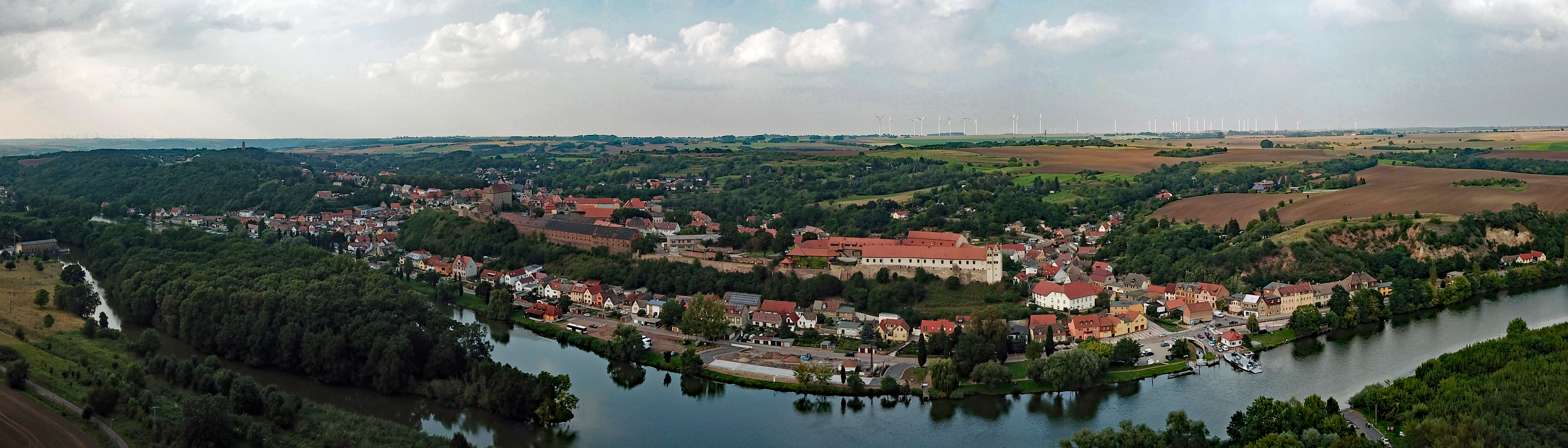
View over Wettin in the Saale Valley

== History ==
Historical affiliations

Archbishopric of Magdeburg 1288–1680
Electorate of Brandenburg 1680–1701
Kingdom of Prussia 1701–1866
North German Confederation 1866–1871
German Empire 1871–1918
Weimar Republic 1918–1933
Nazi Germany 1933–1945
Allied-occupied Germany 1945–1949
East Germany 1949–1990
Germany 1990–

Wettin was first documented as Vitin civitas in a 961 deed issued by German king Otto I. The settlement thereafter was a burgward within the Saxon Eastern March, held by Dietrich I von Wettin, the progenitor of the dynasty. His descendants became Margraves of Lusatia in 1032 and of Meissen in 1123. In 1288 Wettin was acquired by the Magdeburg archbishop Eric of Brandenburg. In 1680, it was annexed by the Electorate of Brandenburg and made part of the Duchy of Magdeburg.

Under Nazi Germany, it was the location of a forced labour subcamp of the prison in Halle (Saale).

Mücheln
The small village of Mücheln (not to be confused with the larger Mücheln near Merseburg) became part of Wettin and includes the restored old chapel of the Poor Fellow-Soldiers of Christ and of the Temple of Solomon (Knights Templar).

Lützkendorf
As bombing targets of the Oil Campaign of World War II, the Lützkendorf oil facilities 2 miles east of Mücheln included
- a small Wintershall AG crude oil refinery (100,000 tons/yr),
- a Bergius process hydrogenation unit (125,000 tons/yr) for blending gasolines,
- a Fischer–Tropsch plant (80,000 tons/yr) to process heavier gasoline cuts from synthesized oil, and
- tankage for about 75,000 metric tons.
The Lützkendorf Grube supplied lignite from the south end of the mine to the two interconnected plants ("Lutzkendorf" and "Lutzkendorf-Mücheln") at 51°17′N 11°52′E, and the facility also used tar for Low Temperature Carbonization.
