= Saalkreis Nord =

Coordinates: 51°38′N 11°54′E

Saalkreis Nord was a Verwaltungsgemeinschaft ("collective municipality") in the Saalekreis district, in Saxony-Anhalt, Germany. It was situated northwest of Halle (Saale). The seat of the Verwaltungsgemeinschaft was in Wettin. It was disbanded in January 2011.

== Municipalities ==
The Verwaltungsgemeinschaft Saalkreis Nord consisted of the following municipalities:

1. Brachwitz
2. Döblitz
3. Domnitz
4. Gimritz
5. Löbejün
6. Nauendorf
7. Neutz-Lettewitz
8. Plötz
9. Rothenburg
10. Wettin
