= Westlicher Saalkreis =

Coordinates: 51°32′N 11°50′E

Westlicher Saalkreis ("Western Saale district") was a Verwaltungsgemeinschaft ("collective municipality") in the Saalekreis district, in Saxony-Anhalt, Germany. It was situated west of Halle (Saale). The seat of the Verwaltungsgemeinschaft was in Salzmünde. It was disbanded on 1 January 2010.

The Verwaltungsgemeinschaft Westlicher Saalkreis consisted of the following municipalities:

1. Beesenstedt
2. Bennstedt
3. Fienstedt
4. Höhnstedt
5. Kloschwitz
6. Lieskau
7. Salzmünde
8. Schochwitz
9. Zappendorf
