= Götschetal-Petersberg =

Collective municipality in the district Saalekreis, Saxony-Anhalt

Coordinates: 51°34′59″N 11°55′00″E

Götschetal-Petersberg was a Verwaltungsgemeinschaft ("collective municipality") in the Saalekreis district, in Saxony-Anhalt, Germany. It was situated north of Halle (Saale). The seat of the Verwaltungsgemeinschaft was in Götschetal. It was disbanded in January 2010.

The Verwaltungsgemeinschaft Götschetal-Petersberg consisted of the following municipalities:

1. Brachstedt
2. Götschetal
3. Krosigk
4. Kütten
5. Morl
6. Ostrau
7. Petersberg
