= Saalkreis =

Coordinates: 51.4667°N 11.9667°E

- District
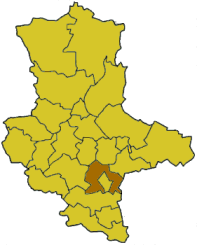
- Country: Germany
- State: Saxony-Anhalt
- Disbanded: 2007-07-01
- Capital: Halle

Area
  - Total: 628.29 km^{2} (242.58 sq mi)

Population (2002)
  - Total: 81,496
  - Density: 129.71/km^{2} (335.95/sq mi)
- Time zone: UTC+01:00 (CET)
  - Summer (DST): UTC+02:00 (CEST)
- Vehicle registration: SK
- Website: saalkreis.de

Saalkreis was a district (Kreis) in the south of Saxony-Anhalt, Germany. Neighboring districts were (from west clockwise) Mansfelder Land, Bernburg, Köthen, Bitterfeld, the district Delitzsch in Saxony, and the district Merseburg-Querfurt. The district-free city Halle is nearly surrounded by the district.

== Geography ==
The main river of the district is the Saale, which also gave it its name. Other rivers and streams flowing through the former district are the Laweke, Würde, Kabelske, Strengbach and Götsche. Whilst the western part of the region is dominated by hillocks and dissecting valleys, the north and east are characterized by flat plains. The Petersberg near Halle, at 250.4 m above sea level (NN), was the highest point of the former Saalkreis and lay in the northeast of the district.

== Coat of arms ==
The coat of arms show the symbols of the historic territories of the district. The top left and bottom right quarters show the arms of the diocese of Magdeburg. The lion in the top right is the symbol of the county of Wettin, while the blue and yellow strips in the bottom left are the arms of the county Landsberg.

== Towns and municipalities ==
Verwaltungsgemeinschaften
1. Götschetal-Petersberg
2. Östlicher Saalkreis (incl. town Landsberg)
3. Saalkreis Nord (incl. towns Löbejün and Wettin)
4. Westlicher Saalkreis
5. Würde/Salza
Free municipalities
1. Kabelsketal
