= Dößel =

- Stadtteil of Wettin-Löbejün
- Interactive map of Dößel
- Location within Germany Location within Saxony-Anhalt
- Coordinates: 51°37′N 11°48′E
- Country: Germany
- State: Saxony-Anhalt
- District: Saalekreis
- Town: Wettin-Löbejün

Area
  - Total: 10.24 km^{2} (3.95 sq mi)
- Elevation: 149 m (489 ft)

Population (2006-12-31)
  - Total: 360
  - Density: 35/km^{2} (91/sq mi)
- Time zone: UTC+01:00 (CET)
  - Summer (DST): UTC+02:00 (CEST)
- Postal codes: 06198
- Dialling codes: 034607

Dößel (German pronunciation: [ˈdøːsl̩]) is a former municipality in the Saalekreis district, Saxony-Anhalt, Germany. On 1 July 2008, it was absorbed by the town Wettin. In January 2011 it became part of the town Wettin-Löbejün.
