= Alberstedt =

- Ortsteil of Farnstädt
- Interactive map of Alberstedt
- Location within Germany Location within Saxony-Anhalt
- Coordinates: 51°27′N 11°38′E
- Country: Germany
- State: Saxony-Anhalt
- District: Saalekreis
- Municipality: Farnstädt

Area
  - Total: 8.78 km^{2} (3.39 sq mi)
- Elevation: 152 m (499 ft)

Population (2006-12-31)
  - Total: 501
  - Density: 57.1/km^{2} (148/sq mi)
- Time zone: UTC+01:00 (CET)
  - Summer (DST): UTC+02:00 (CEST)
- Postal codes: 06279
- Dialling codes: 034774

Alberstedt is a village and a former municipality in the Saalekreis district, Saxony-Anhalt, Germany. It is situated between Halle (Saale) and Sangerhausen. The earliest mention of Alberstedt appears in a 9th-century document of the Hersfeld Abbey.

Since 1 January 2010, it is part of the municipality Farnstädt.
