= Albersroda =

- Ortsteil of Steigra
- Interactive map of Albersroda
- Location within Germany Location within Saxony-Anhalt
- Coordinates: 51°17′N 11°43′E
- Country: Germany
- State: Saxony-Anhalt
- District: Saalekreis
- Municipality: Steigra

Area
  - Total: 13.58 km^{2} (5.24 sq mi)
- Elevation: 148 m (486 ft)

Population (2006-12-31)
  - Total: 467
  - Density: 34.4/km^{2} (89.1/sq mi)
- Time zone: UTC+01:00 (CET)
  - Summer (DST): UTC+02:00 (CEST)
- Postal codes: 06268
- Dialling codes: 034632
- Vehicle registration: SK

Albersroda is a village and a former municipality in the district Saalekreis, in Saxony-Anhalt, Germany.

Since 1 January 2010, it is part of the municipality Steigra.
