= Esperstedt =

- Ortsteil of Obhausen
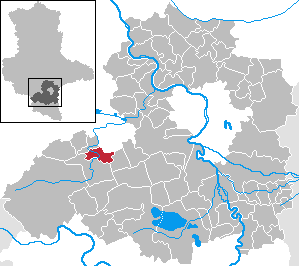
- Location of Esperstedt within Saalekreis district
- Interactive map of Esperstedt
- Location within Germany Location within Saxony-Anhalt
- Coordinates: 51°25′34″N 11°40′47″E
- Country: Germany
- State: Saxony-Anhalt
- District: Saalekreis
- Municipality: Obhausen

Area
  - Total: 10.96 km^{2} (4.23 sq mi)
- Elevation: 140 m (460 ft)

Population (2006-12-31)
  - Total: 675
  - Density: 61.6/km^{2} (160/sq mi)
- Time zone: UTC+01:00 (CET)
  - Summer (DST): UTC+02:00 (CEST)
- Postal codes: 06279
- Dialling codes: 034774
- Vehicle registration: MQ

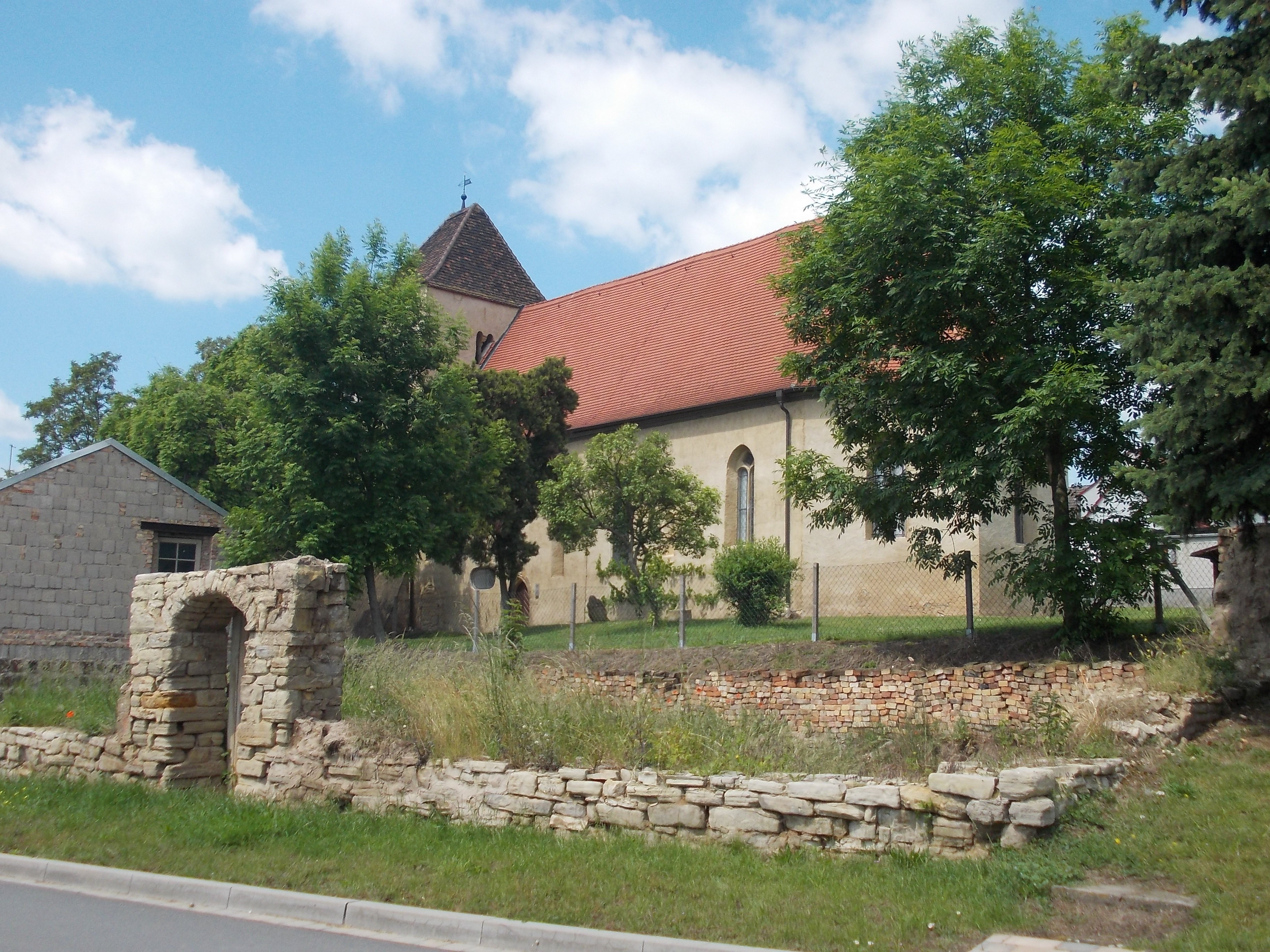
St. Petri church

Esperstedt (German pronunciation: [ˈɛspɐʃtɛt]) is a village and a former municipality in the Saalekreis district, Saxony-Anhalt, Germany. Since 1 January 2010, it is part of the municipality Obhausen.

== Geography ==
Esperstedt is situated on the river Weida and is located between Halle (Saale) and Querfurt.

== History ==
The earliest known documented mention of the village is listed in Hersfeld Abbey's tithing rolls from between 881 and 899 as the tithable place Osperstadt in Friesenfeld. Around 900 the village belonged to the Castellan Schraplau in Hassegau. In 1200 it belonged to the Archbishopric of Magdeburg. The name is derived from the word Espen meaning aspen or poplar tree.

== Transport ==
Exit 20 of the Bundesautobahn 38 Göttingen–Leipzig is located at the edge of town.

== Sights ==
- Church in the lower village
- Gravestone in the Ortsfriedhof cemetery for the communist miner Max König, who died in 1937 in Lichtenburg concentration camp on account of ill-treatment.
