= 1712 in poetry =

Nationality words link to articles with information on the nation's poetry or literature (for instance, Irish or France).

== Events ==
- Scriblerus Club begins meeting (stops meeting in 1745)

== Works published ==
- Sir Richard Blackmore, Creation: a philosophical poem
- John Dennis, Essay on the Genius and Writings of Shakspear: with Some Letters of Criticism to the Spectator, a pamphlet of literary criticism, London
- William Diaper:
  - Dryaides; or, The Nymphs Prophecy (published this year, although the book states "1713")
  - Nereides; or, Sea-Eclogues
- Thomas Ellwood, Davideis: The Life of King David of Israel
- George Granville, Lord Lansdowne, Poems Upon Several Occasions
- Bernard Mandeville, published anonymously, Typhon; or, The Wars Between the Gods and Giants
- Peter Anthony Motteux, A Poem Upon Tea
- John Philips, Poems, published posthumously
- Alexander Pope, editor, Miscellaneous Poems and Translations (also known as Lintot's Miscellany), including a two-canto version of Pope's "The Rape of the Lock", published anonymously (poem enlarged in 1714)
- Matthew Prior, published anonymously, Erle Robert's Mice: A tale, in imitation of Chaucer
- Nicholas Rowe, translated from Claude Quillet, Callipaedia
- Shota Rustaveli, The Knight in the Panther's Skin first printed (originally written in the 12th century)
- George Sewell, The Patriot
- Thomas Tickell, A Poem, to his Excellency the Lord Privy-Seal, on the Prospect of Peace
- John Wright, The Best Mirth; or, The Melody of Sion, hymns

== Births ==
Death years link to the corresponding "[year] in poetry" article:

- October 8 – Alison Cockburn, née Rutherford (died 1794), Scottish poet
- December 3 – Joseph Relph (died 1743), English poet from Cumberland
- Richard Glover (died 1785), English poet
- Bharatchandra Ray (died 1760), Bengali and Sanskrit poet and song composer
- Christian Reuter (died 1765), German poet
- Approximate date – Emanuel Collins, English clergyman and miscellaneous writer

== Deaths ==
Birth years link to the corresponding "[year] in poetry" article:

- February 5 (bur.) – John Norris of Bemerton (born 1657), English theologian, philosopher and poet
- April 10 – Yusuf Nabi (born 1642), Turkish diwan poet, attacked by honey badger
- June 12 – Carlo Alessandro Guidi (born 1650), Italian poet
- July 1 – William King (born 1663), English poet

== See also ==
- Poetry
- List of years in poetry
- List of years in literature
- 18th century in poetry
- 18th century in literature
- Augustan poetry

== Notes ==
- "A Timeline of English Poetry" Web page of the Representative Poetry Online Web site, University of Toronto
