= Östlicher Saalkreis =

Coordinates: 51°32′N 12°10′E

Östlicher Saalkreis ("Eastern Saale district") is a former Verwaltungsgemeinschaft ("collective municipality") in the Saalekreis district, in Saxony-Anhalt, Germany. It was situated east of Halle (Saale). The seat of the Verwaltungsgemeinschaft was in Landsberg.

It was disbanded in September 2010.

The Verwaltungsgemeinschaft Östlicher Saalkreis consisted of the following municipalities:

1. Hohenthurm
2. Landsberg
3. Peißen
