= Farnstädt =

- Municipality
- Location of Farnstädt within Saalekreis district
- Interactive map of Farnstädt
- Location within Germany Location within Saxony-Anhalt
- Coordinates: 51°25′39″N 11°34′43″E
- Country: Germany
- State: Saxony-Anhalt
- District: Saalekreis
- Municipal assoc.: Weida-Land
- Subdivisions: 2

Government
  - Mayor (2021–28): Frank Mylich

Area
  - Total: 27.13 km^{2} (10.47 sq mi)
- Elevation: 176 m (577 ft)

Population (2025-12-31)
  - Total: 1,418
  - Density: 52.27/km^{2} (135.4/sq mi)
- Time zone: UTC+01:00 (CET)
  - Summer (DST): UTC+02:00 (CEST)
- Postal codes: 06279
- Dialling codes: 034776
- Vehicle registration: SK
- Website: www.farnstaedt.de

Farnstädt is a municipality in the Saalekreis district, Saxony-Anhalt, Germany. Since 1 January 2010 Alberstedt has been incorporated.
