= Fienstedt =

- Ortsteil of Salzatal
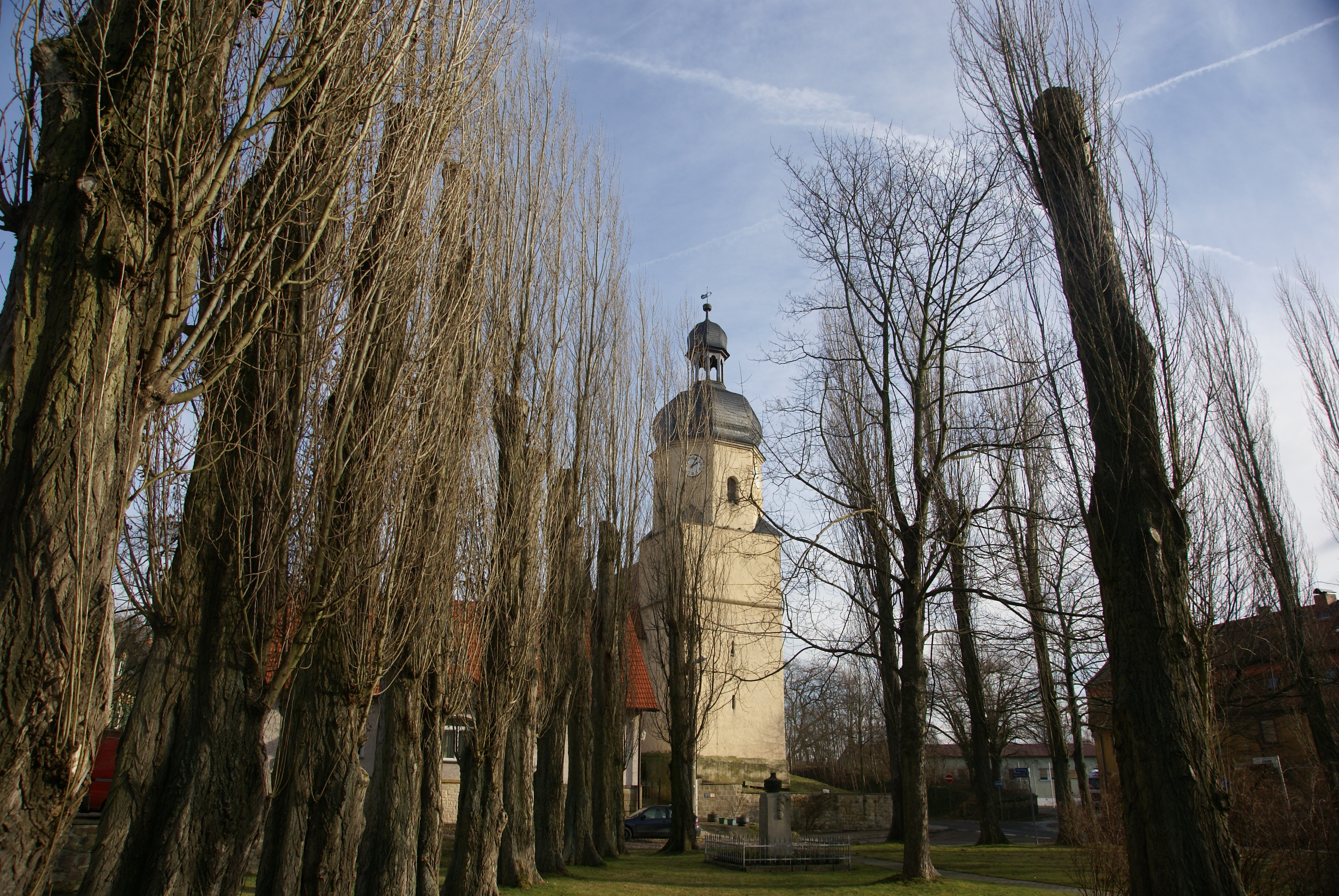
- Church
- Interactive map of Fienstedt
- Location within Germany Location within Saxony-Anhalt
- Coordinates: 51°33′N 11°47′E
- Country: Germany
- State: Saxony-Anhalt
- District: Saalekreis
- Municipality: Salzatal

Area
  - Total: 8.52 km^{2} (3.29 sq mi)
- Elevation: 132 m (433 ft)

Population (2006-12-31)
  - Total: 236
  - Density: 27.7/km^{2} (71.7/sq mi)
- Time zone: UTC+01:00 (CET)
  - Summer (DST): UTC+02:00 (CEST)
- Postal codes: 06198
- Dialling codes: 034609

Fienstedt is a village and a former municipality in the district Saalekreis, in Saxony-Anhalt, Germany.

Since 1 January 2010, it is part of the municipality Salzatal.
