= Krosigk =

- Ortsteil of Petersberg
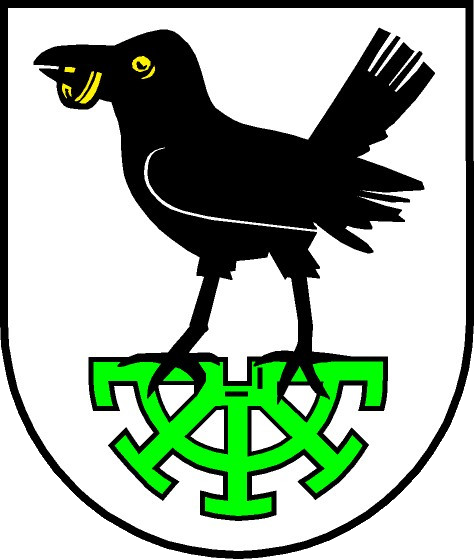
- Coat of arms
- Interactive map of Krosigk
- Location within Germany Location within Saxony-Anhalt
- Coordinates: 51°36′N 11°56′E
- Country: Germany
- State: Saxony-Anhalt
- District: Saalekreis
- Municipality: Petersberg

Area
  - Total: 9.03 km^{2} (3.49 sq mi)
- Elevation: 176 m (577 ft)

Population (2006-12-31)
  - Total: 874
  - Density: 96.8/km^{2} (251/sq mi)
- Time zone: UTC+01:00 (CET)
  - Summer (DST): UTC+02:00 (CEST)
- Postal codes: 06193
- Dialling codes: 034603

Krosigk is a village and a former municipality in the district Saalekreis, in Saxony-Anhalt, Germany.

Since 1 January 2010, it is part of the municipality Petersberg.
