= Zappendorf =

- Ortsteil of Salzatal
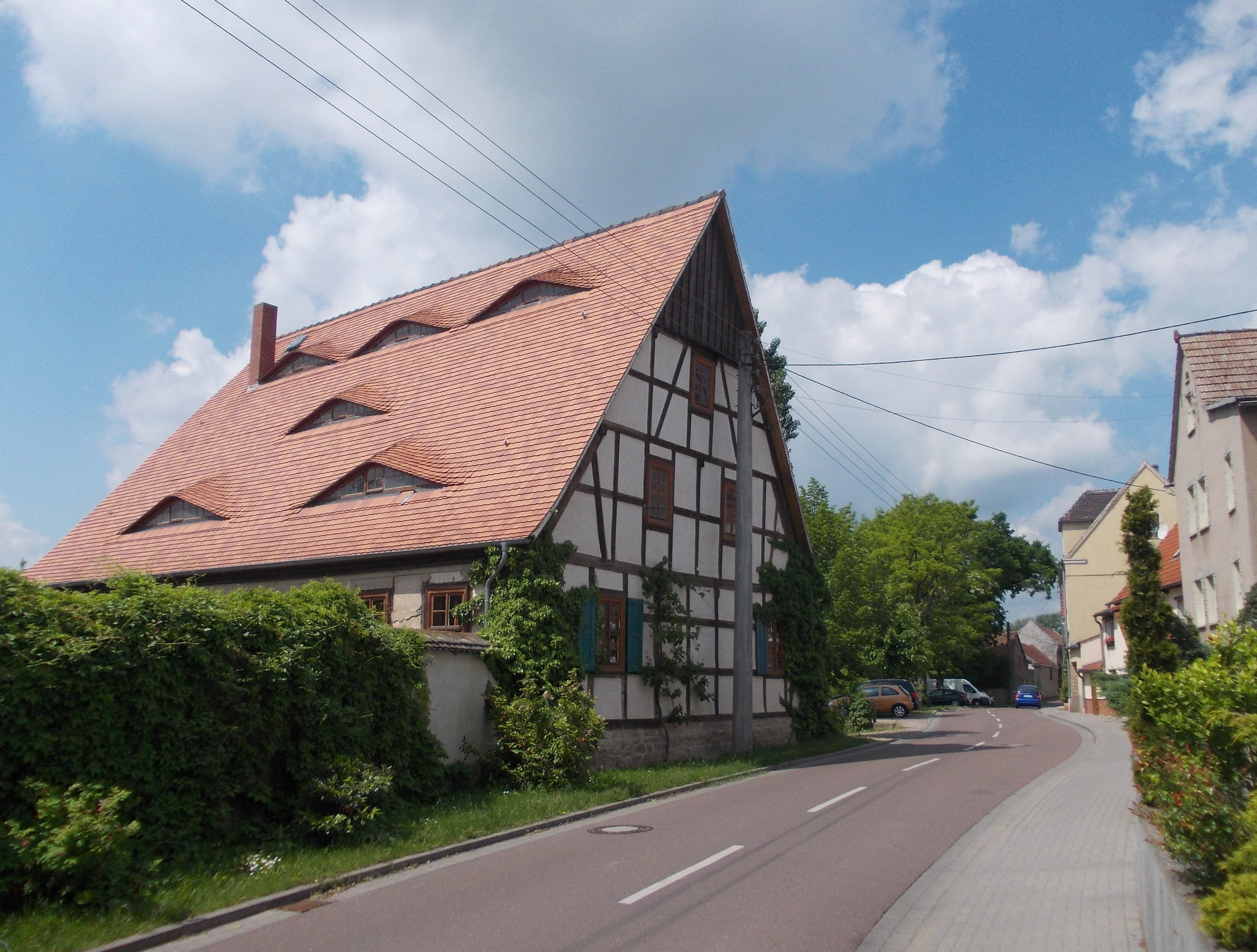
- Former water mill
- Interactive map of Zappendorf
- Location within Germany Location within Saxony-Anhalt
- Coordinates: 51°30′28″N 11°48′22″E
- Country: Germany
- State: Saxony-Anhalt
- District: Saalekreis
- Municipality: Salzatal

Area
  - Total: 11.2 km^{2} (4.3 sq mi)
- Elevation: 90 m (300 ft)

Population (2006-12-31)
  - Total: 1,543
  - Density: 138/km^{2} (357/sq mi)
- Time zone: UTC+01:00 (CET)
  - Summer (DST): UTC+02:00 (CEST)
- Postal codes: 06179
- Dialling codes: 034609

Zappendorf is a village and former municipality in the district Saalekreis, in Saxony-Anhalt, Germany.

Since 1 January 2010, it is part of the municipality Salzatal.
