= Bennstedt =

- Ortsteil of Salzatal
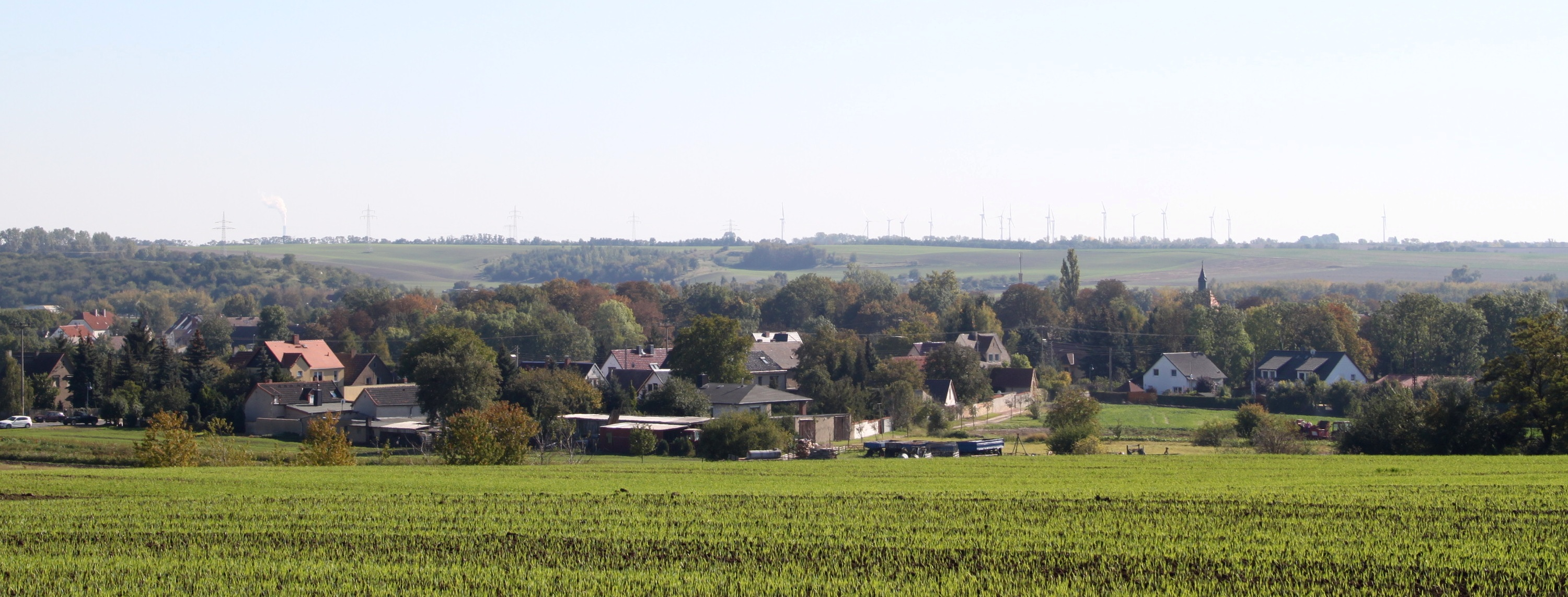

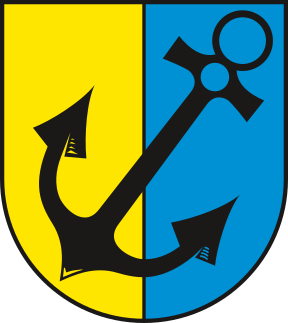
- Coat of arms
- Interactive map of Bennstedt
- Location within Germany Location within Saxony-Anhalt
- Coordinates: 51°29′N 11°50′E
- Country: Germany
- State: Saxony-Anhalt
- District: Saalekreis
- Municipality: Salzatal

Area
  - Total: 9.34 km^{2} (3.61 sq mi)
- Elevation: 114 m (374 ft)

Population (2008-12-31)
  - Total: 1,558
  - Density: 167/km^{2} (432/sq mi)
- Time zone: UTC+01:00 (CET)
  - Summer (DST): UTC+02:00 (CEST)
- Postal codes: 06198
- Dialling codes: 034601

Bennstedt is a village and a former municipality in the district Saalekreis, in Saxony-Anhalt, Germany.

Since 1 January 2010, it is part of the municipality Salzatal.

== Pictures ==
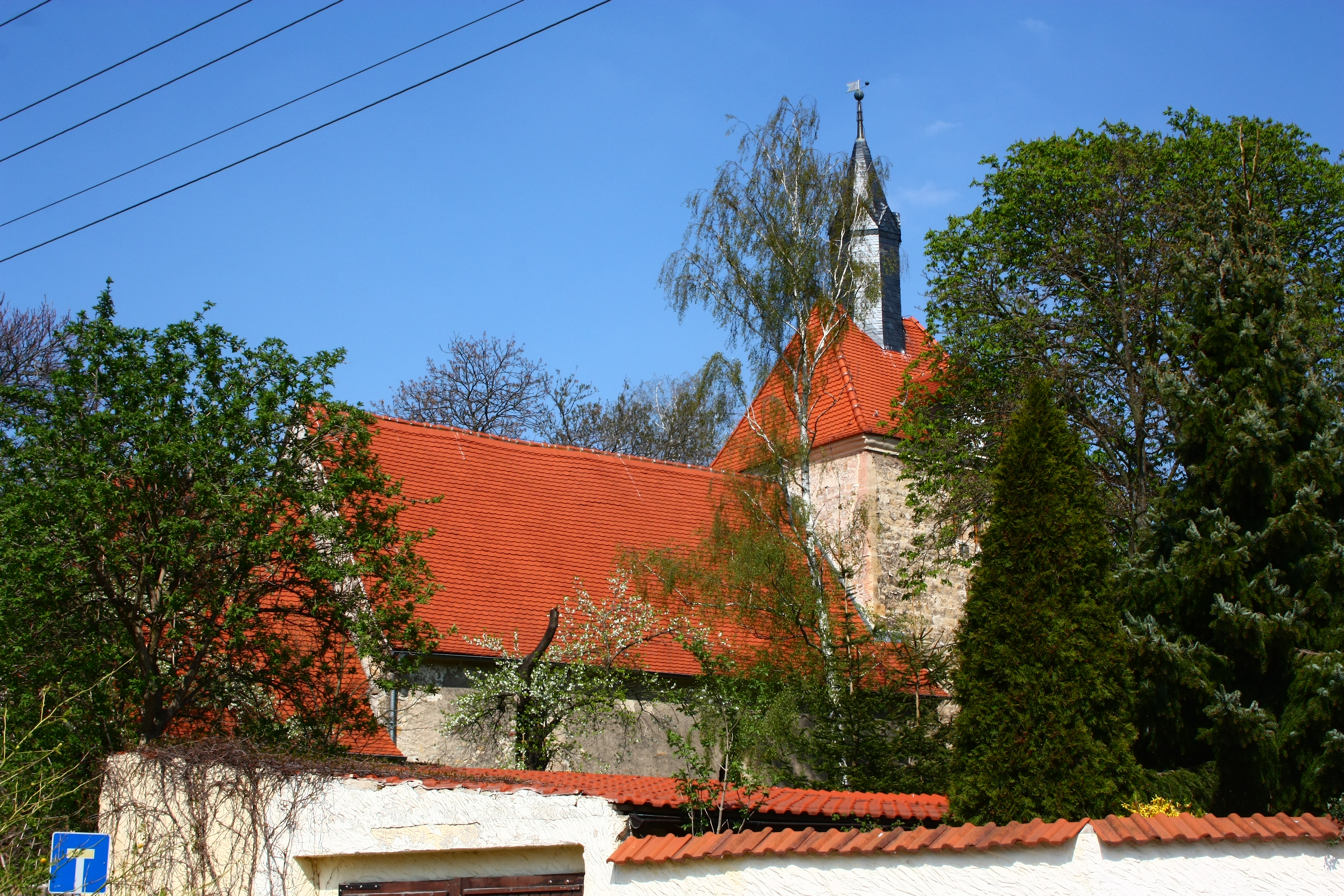
The church in Bennstedt

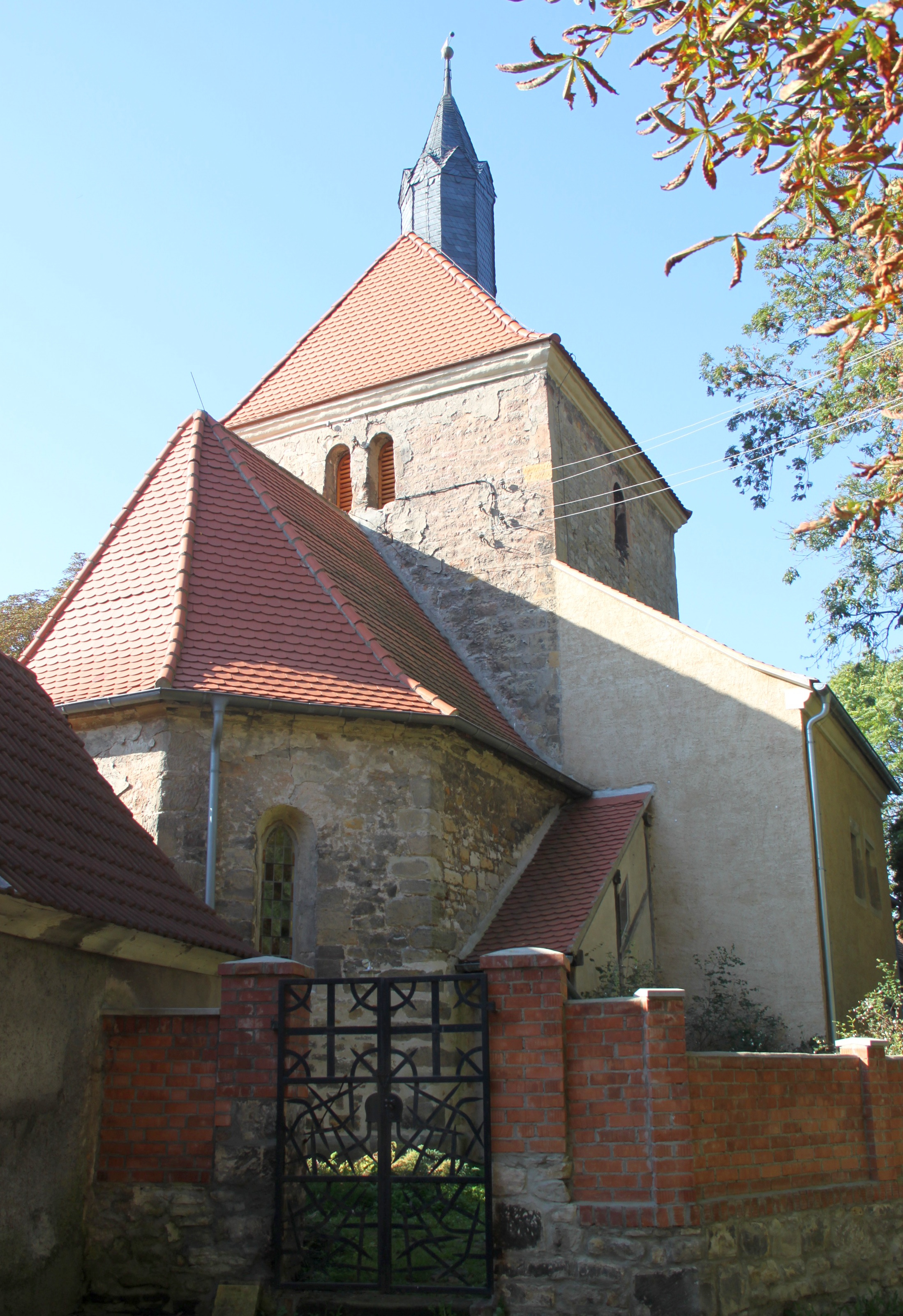
The church, detailed view
