= Ostrau (Petersberg) =

- Ortsteil of Petersberg
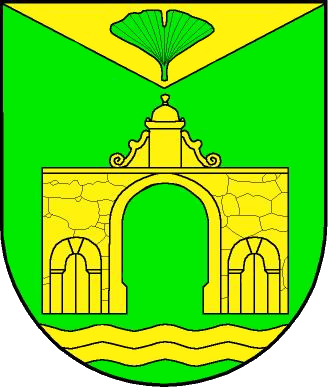
- Coat of arms
- Interactive map of Ostrau
- Location within Germany Location within Saxony-Anhalt
- Coordinates: 51°37′0″N 12°0′35″E
- Country: Germany
- State: Saxony-Anhalt
- District: Saalekreis
- Municipality: Petersberg

Area
  - Total: 17.27 km^{2} (6.67 sq mi)
- Elevation: 85 m (279 ft)

Population (2006-12-31)
  - Total: 1,260
  - Density: 73.0/km^{2} (189/sq mi)
- Time zone: UTC+01:00 (CET)
  - Summer (DST): UTC+02:00 (CEST)
- Postal codes: 06193
- Dialling codes: 034600

Ostrau (German pronunciation: [ˈɔstʁaʊ]) is a village and a former municipality in the district Saalekreis, in Saxony-Anhalt, Germany.

On 1 January 2010, it merged into the municipality of Petersberg.
