= Würde/Salza =

Municipality in Saxony-Anhalt, Germany

Coordinates: 51°27′N 11°48′E

Würde/Salza is a former Verwaltungsgemeinschaft ("collective municipality") in the Saalekreis district, in Saxony-Anhalt, Germany. It was situated west of Halle (Saale). The seat of the Verwaltungsgemeinschaft was in Teutschenthal. It was disbanded in September 2010.

The Verwaltungsgemeinschaft Würde/Salza consisted of the following municipalities:

1. Angersdorf
2. Teutschenthal
