= Weida-Land =

Municipality in Saxony-Anhalt, Germany

- Verbandsgemeinde
- Map of Saalekreis highlighting Weida-Land
- Interactive map of Weida-Land
- Location within Germany Location within Saxony-Anhalt
- Coordinates: 51°21′N 11°39′E
- Country: Germany
- State: Saxony-Anhalt
- District: Saalekreis
- Seat: Nemsdorf-Göhrendorf
- Subdivisions: 6 municipalities

Area
  - Total: 136.51 km^{2} (52.71 sq mi)

Population (2025-12-31)
  - Total: 7,251
  - Density: 53.12/km^{2} (137.6/sq mi)
- Time zone: UTC+01:00 (CET)
  - Summer (DST): UTC+02:00 (CEST)
- Website: www.weida-land.de

Weida-Land is a Verbandsgemeinde ("collective municipality") in the Saalekreis district, in Saxony-Anhalt, Germany. It is situated between Querfurt and Eisleben. Before 1 January 2010, it was a Verwaltungsgemeinschaft. The seat of the Verbandsgemeinde is in Nemsdorf-Göhrendorf.

The Verbandsgemeinde Weida-Land consists of the following municipalities:

1. Barnstädt
2. Farnstädt
3. Nemsdorf-Göhrendorf
4. Obhausen
5. Schraplau
6. Steigra
