= Brachstedt =

- Ortsteil of Petersberg
- Interactive map of Brachstedt
- Location within Germany Location within Saxony-Anhalt
- Coordinates: 51°34′N 12°3′E
- Country: Germany
- State: Saxony-Anhalt
- District: Saalekreis
- Municipality: Petersberg

Area
  - Total: 14.52 km^{2} (5.61 sq mi)
- Elevation: 114 m (374 ft)

Population (2006-12-31)
  - Total: 915
  - Density: 63.0/km^{2} (163/sq mi)
- Time zone: UTC+01:00 (CET)
  - Summer (DST): UTC+02:00 (CEST)
- Postal codes: 06188
- Dialling codes: 034602 / 034604

Brachstedt is a village and a former municipality in the district Saalekreis, in Saxony-Anhalt, Germany.

Since 1 January 2010, it has been part of the municipality Petersberg.
