= Beesenstedt =

- Ortsteil of Salzatal
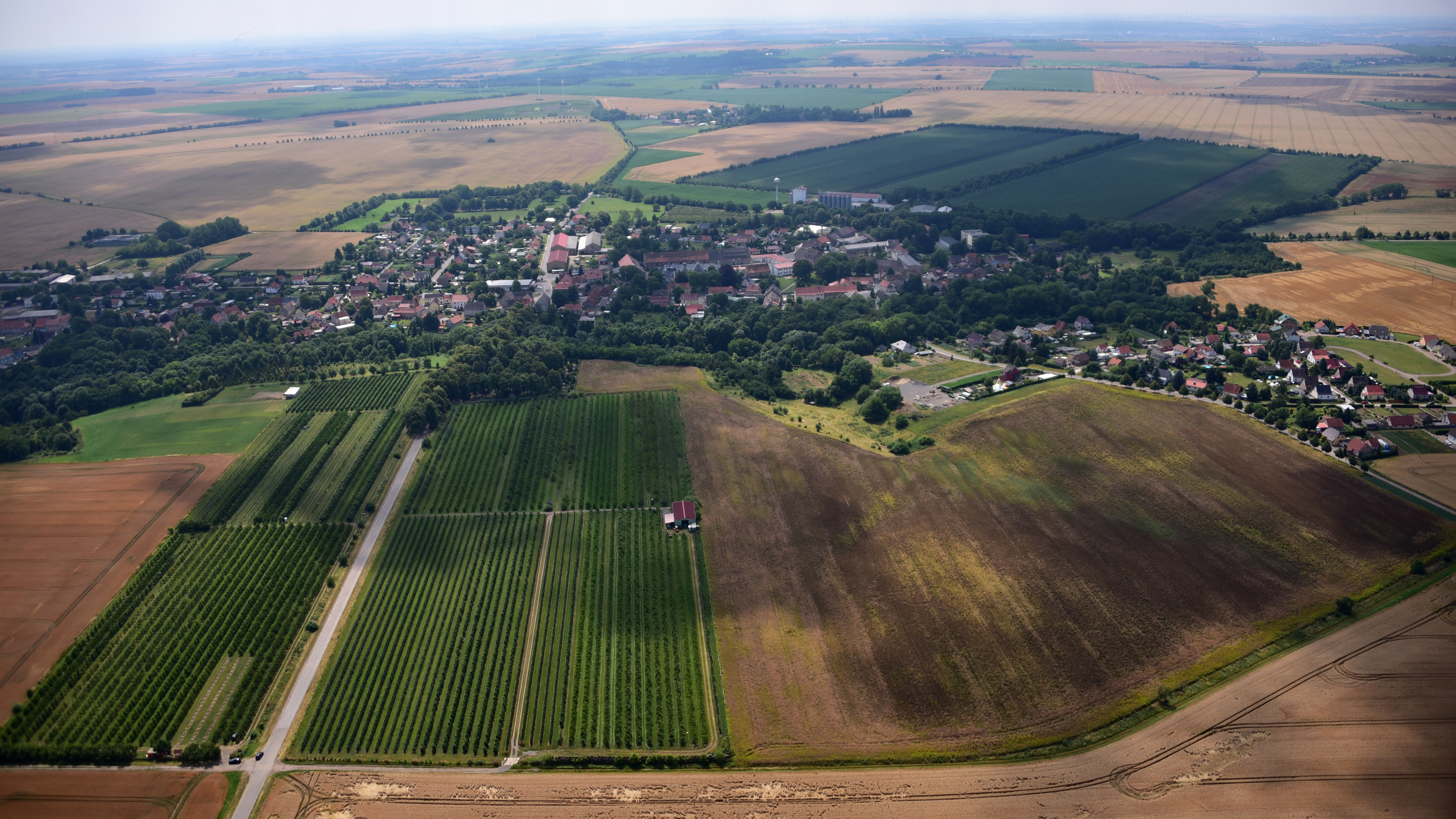
- Aerial view

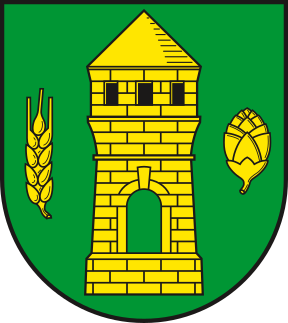
- Coat of arms
- Interactive map of Beesenstedt
- Location within Germany Location within Saxony-Anhalt
- Coordinates: 51°34′N 11°44′E
- Country: Germany
- State: Saxony-Anhalt
- District: Saalekreis
- Municipality: Salzatal

Area
  - Total: 17.58 km^{2} (6.79 sq mi)
- Elevation: 172 m (564 ft)

Population (2006-12-31)
  - Total: 1,266
  - Density: 72.01/km^{2} (186.5/sq mi)
- Time zone: UTC+01:00 (CET)
  - Summer (DST): UTC+02:00 (CEST)
- Postal codes: 06198
- Dialling codes: 034773

Beesenstedt is a village and a former municipality in the district Saalekreis, in Saxony-Anhalt, Germany.

Since January 1, 2010, it has been part of the municipality Salzatal.
