= Obhausen =

- Municipality
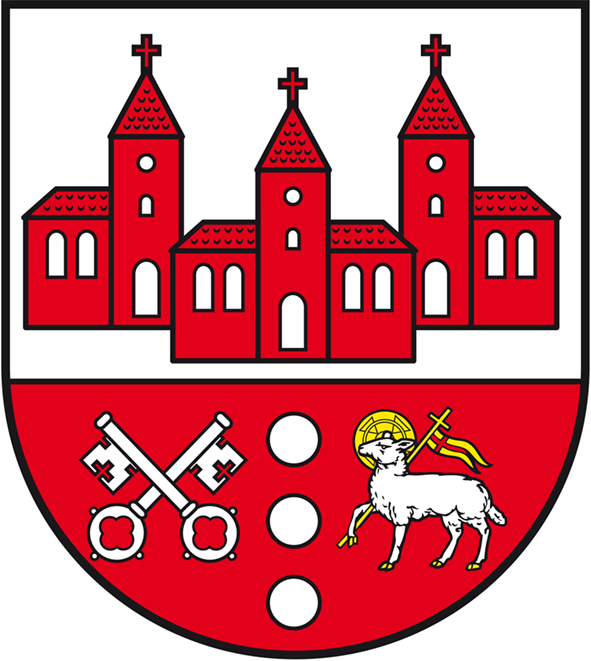
- Coat of arms

- Location of Obhausen within Saalekreis district
- Interactive map of Obhausen
- Location within Germany Location within Saxony-Anhalt
- Coordinates: 51°24′N 11°40′E
- Country: Germany
- State: Saxony-Anhalt
- District: Saalekreis
- Municipal assoc.: Weida-Land
- Subdivisions: 3

Government
  - Mayor (2022–29): Sven Hoffmann

Area
  - Total: 39.3 km^{2} (15.2 sq mi)
- Elevation: 176 m (577 ft)

Population (2025-12-31)
  - Total: 2,111
  - Density: 53.7/km^{2} (139/sq mi)
- Time zone: UTC+01:00 (CET)
  - Summer (DST): UTC+02:00 (CEST)
- Postal codes: 06268
- Dialling codes: 034771
- Vehicle registration: SK
- Website: www.obhausen.de

Obhausen is a municipality in the Saalekreis district, Saxony-Anhalt, Germany. In January 2010 it absorbed the former municipality Esperstedt.
