= Steigra =

- Municipality
- Location of Steigra within Saalekreis district
- Interactive map of Steigra
- Location within Germany Location within Saxony-Anhalt
- Coordinates: 51°18′N 11°40′E
- Country: Germany
- State: Saxony-Anhalt
- District: Saalekreis
- Municipal assoc.: Weida-Land
- Subdivisions: 5

Government
  - Mayor (2019–26): Michael Stockhaus

Area
  - Total: 29.65 km^{2} (11.45 sq mi)
- Elevation: 213 m (699 ft)

Population (2025-12-31)
  - Total: 1,030
  - Density: 34.7/km^{2} (90.0/sq mi)
- Time zone: UTC+01:00 (CET)
  - Summer (DST): UTC+02:00 (CEST)
- Postal codes: 06268
- Dialling codes: 034461
- Vehicle registration: SK

Steigra is a municipality in the Saalekreis district, Saxony-Anhalt, Germany. In January 2010 the former municipality of Albersroda was absorbed into Steigra.

== Geography ==
The municipality is subdivided into the following villages (Ortsteile): Steigra, Schnellroda, Albersroda, Kalzendorf, Jüdendorf.
