= Morl =

- Ortschaft of Petersberg
- Coat of arms
- Interactive map of Morl
- Location within Germany Location within Saxony-Anhalt
- Coordinates: 51°33′N 11°55′E
- Country: Germany
- State: Saxony-Anhalt
- District: Saalekreis
- Municipality: Petersberg

Area
  - Total: 9.03 km^{2} (3.49 sq mi)
- Elevation: 113 m (371 ft)

Population (2006-12-31)
  - Total: 920
  - Density: 100/km^{2} (260/sq mi)
- Time zone: UTC+01:00 (CET)
  - Summer (DST): UTC+02:00 (CEST)
- Postal codes: 06193
- Dialling codes: 034606

Morl is a village and a former municipality in the district Saalekreis, in Saxony-Anhalt, Germany.

Since 1 January 2010, it is part of the municipality Petersberg.
