= Kütten =

- Ortsteil of Petersberg
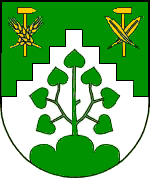
- Coat of arms
- Interactive map of Kütten
- Location within Germany Location within Saxony-Anhalt
- Coordinates: 51°35′N 12°0′E
- Country: Germany
- State: Saxony-Anhalt
- District: Saalekreis
- Municipality: Petersberg

Area
  - Total: 8.92 km^{2} (3.44 sq mi)
- Elevation: 142 m (466 ft)

Population (2006-12-31)
  - Total: 422
  - Density: 47.3/km^{2} (123/sq mi)
- Time zone: UTC+01:00 (CET)
  - Summer (DST): UTC+02:00 (CEST)
- Postal codes: 06193
- Dialling codes: 034600
- Website: Official Website

Kütten is a district in the municipality Petersberg, in the Saalekreis district of Saxony-Anhalt, Germany. Until the formation of a unified municipality of Petersberg on 1 January 2010, Kütten was an independent village in the administrative community of Götschetal-Petersberg. The last mayor of Kütten, until 2010, was Heinz Pohl.

== Notable people ==
- Christian Reuter (1665 – c. 1712), a German author
