= Lieskau =

- Ortsteil of Salzatal
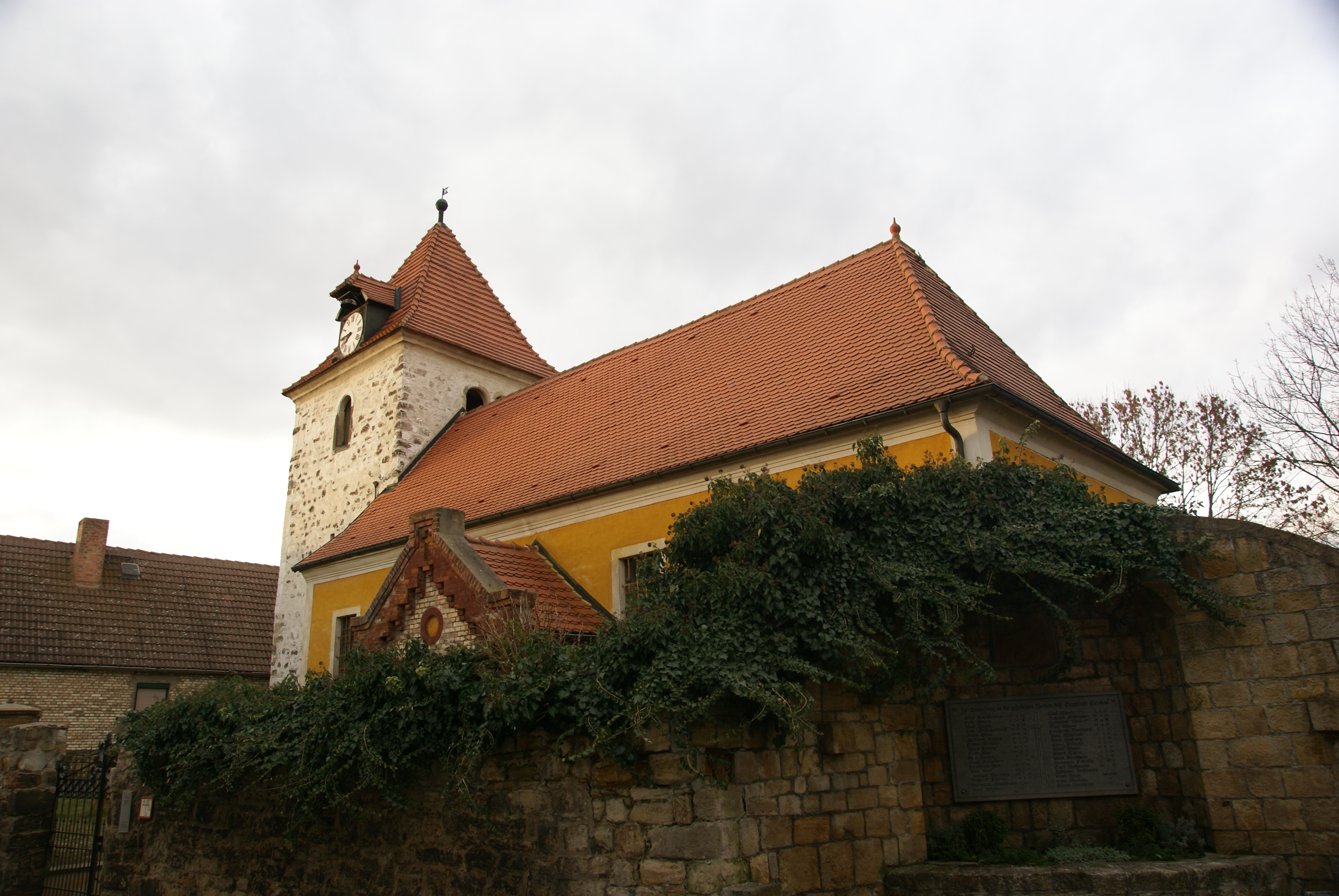
- Church in Lieskau

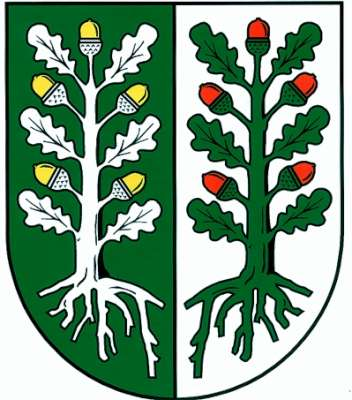
- Coat of arms
- Interactive map of Lieskau
- Location within Germany Location within Saxony-Anhalt
- Coordinates: 51°30′N 11°52′E
- Country: Germany
- State: Saxony-Anhalt
- District: Saalekreis
- Municipality: Salzatal

Area
  - Total: 4.58 km^{2} (1.77 sq mi)
- Elevation: 99 m (325 ft)

Population (2006-12-31)
  - Total: 2,652
  - Density: 579/km^{2} (1,500/sq mi)
- Time zone: UTC+01:00 (CET)
  - Summer (DST): UTC+02:00 (CEST)
- Postal codes: 06120
- Dialling codes: 0345

Lieskau is a village and a former municipality in the district Saalekreis, in Saxony-Anhalt, Germany.

Since 1 January 2010, it is part of the municipality Salzatal.
