= Salzmünde =

- Ortsteil of Salzatal
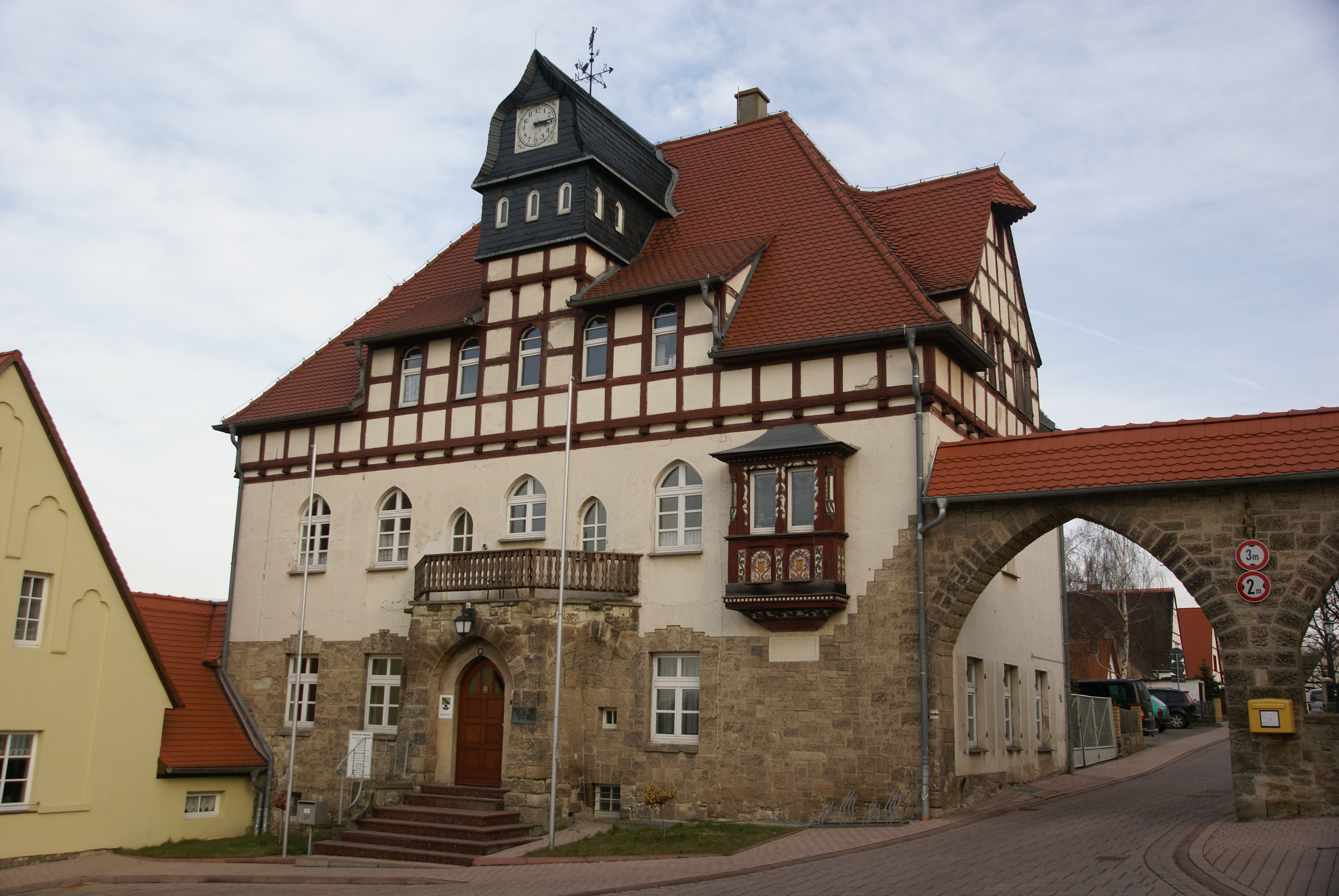
- Town hall in Salzmünde

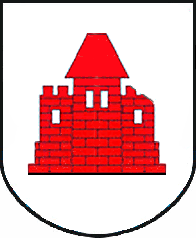
- Coat of arms
- Interactive map of Salzmünde
- Location within Germany Location within Saxony-Anhalt
- Coordinates: 51°32′N 11°50′E
- Country: Germany
- State: Saxony-Anhalt
- District: Saalekreis
- Municipality: Salzatal

Area
  - Total: 18.01 km^{2} (6.95 sq mi)
- Elevation: 74 m (243 ft)

Population (2006-12-31)
  - Total: 2,486
  - Density: 138.0/km^{2} (357.5/sq mi)
- Time zone: UTC+01:00 (CET)
  - Summer (DST): UTC+02:00 (CEST)
- Postal codes: 06198
- Dialling codes: 034609

Salzmünde is a village and a former municipality in the district Saalekreis, in Saxony-Anhalt, Germany.

Since 1 January 2010, it is part of the municipality Salzatal.
