= Götschetal =

- Interactive map of Götschetal
- Location within Germany Location within Saxony-Anhalt
- Coordinates: 51°35′N 11°55′E
- Country: Germany
- State: Saxony-Anhalt
- District: Saalekreis
- Disbanded: 2010

Area
  - Total: 33.02 km^{2} (12.75 sq mi)
- Elevation: 121 m (397 ft)

Population (2006-12-31)
  - Total: 5,863
  - Density: 177.6/km^{2} (459.9/sq mi)
- Time zone: UTC+01:00 (CET)
  - Summer (DST): UTC+02:00 (CEST)
- Postal codes: 06193
- Dialling codes: 034606

Götschetal was a short-lived municipality in the district Saalekreis, in Saxony-Anhalt, Germany. It was created in July 2006 by the merger of the former municipalities Wallwitz, Gutenberg, Nehlitz, Sennewitz and Teicha. On 1 January 2010, it was absorbed into the municipality Petersberg.
