= Barnstädt =

- Municipality
- Location of Barnstädt within Saalekreis district
- Interactive map of Barnstädt
- Location within Germany Location within Saxony-Anhalt
- Coordinates: 51°21′N 11°39′E
- Country: Germany
- State: Saxony-Anhalt
- District: Saalekreis
- Municipal assoc.: Weida-Land

Government
  - Mayor (2022–29): Gerald Reichmann

Area
  - Total: 18.22 km^{2} (7.03 sq mi)
- Elevation: 206 m (676 ft)

Population (2025-12-31)
  - Total: 890
  - Density: 49/km^{2} (130/sq mi)
- Time zone: UTC+01:00 (CET)
  - Summer (DST): UTC+02:00 (CEST)
- Postal codes: 06268
- Dialling codes: 034771
- Vehicle registration: SK

Barnstädt (German pronunciation: [ˈbaʁnʃtɛt]) is a municipality in the Saalekreis district, Saxony-Anhalt, Germany. It is a member of the Verbandsgemeinde Weida-Land.
