= Nemsdorf-Göhrendorf =

- Municipality
- Location of Nemsdorf-Göhrendorf within Saalekreis district
- Interactive map of Nemsdorf-Göhrendorf
- Location within Germany Location within Saxony-Anhalt
- Coordinates: 51°21′N 11°39′E
- Country: Germany
- State: Saxony-Anhalt
- District: Saalekreis
- Municipal assoc.: Weida-Land

Government
  - Mayor (2022–29): Ronny Kluge

Area
  - Total: 17.11 km^{2} (6.61 sq mi)
- Elevation: 206 m (676 ft)

Population (2025-12-31)
  - Total: 801
  - Density: 46.8/km^{2} (121/sq mi)
- Time zone: UTC+01:00 (CET)
  - Summer (DST): UTC+02:00 (CEST)
- Postal codes: 06268
- Dialling codes: 034771
- Vehicle registration: SK

Nemsdorf-Göhrendorf is a municipality in the Saalekreis district, Saxony-Anhalt, Germany. It is the seat of the Verbandsgemeinde ("collective municipality") Weida-Land.
