= Wettin-Löbejün =

- Town
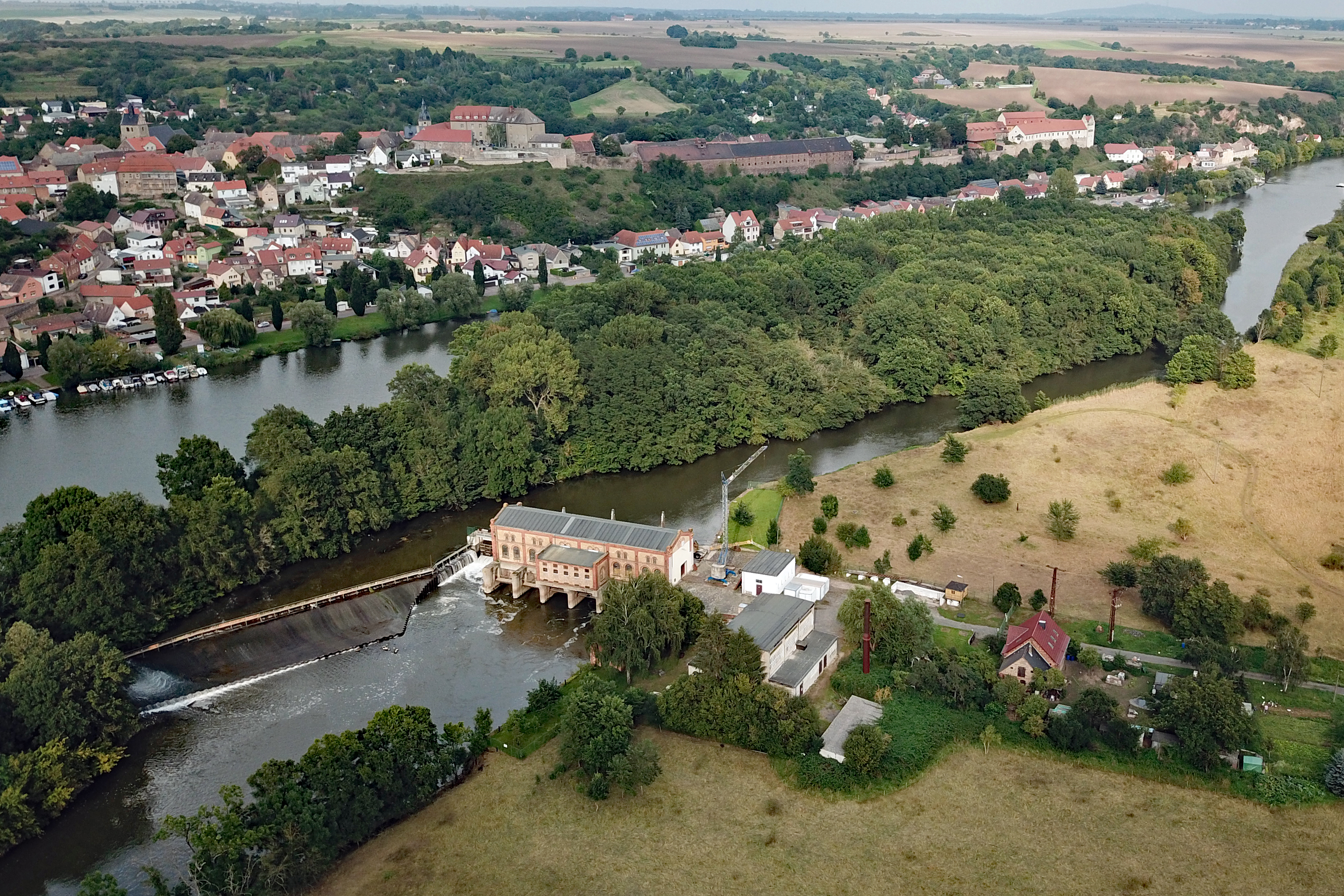

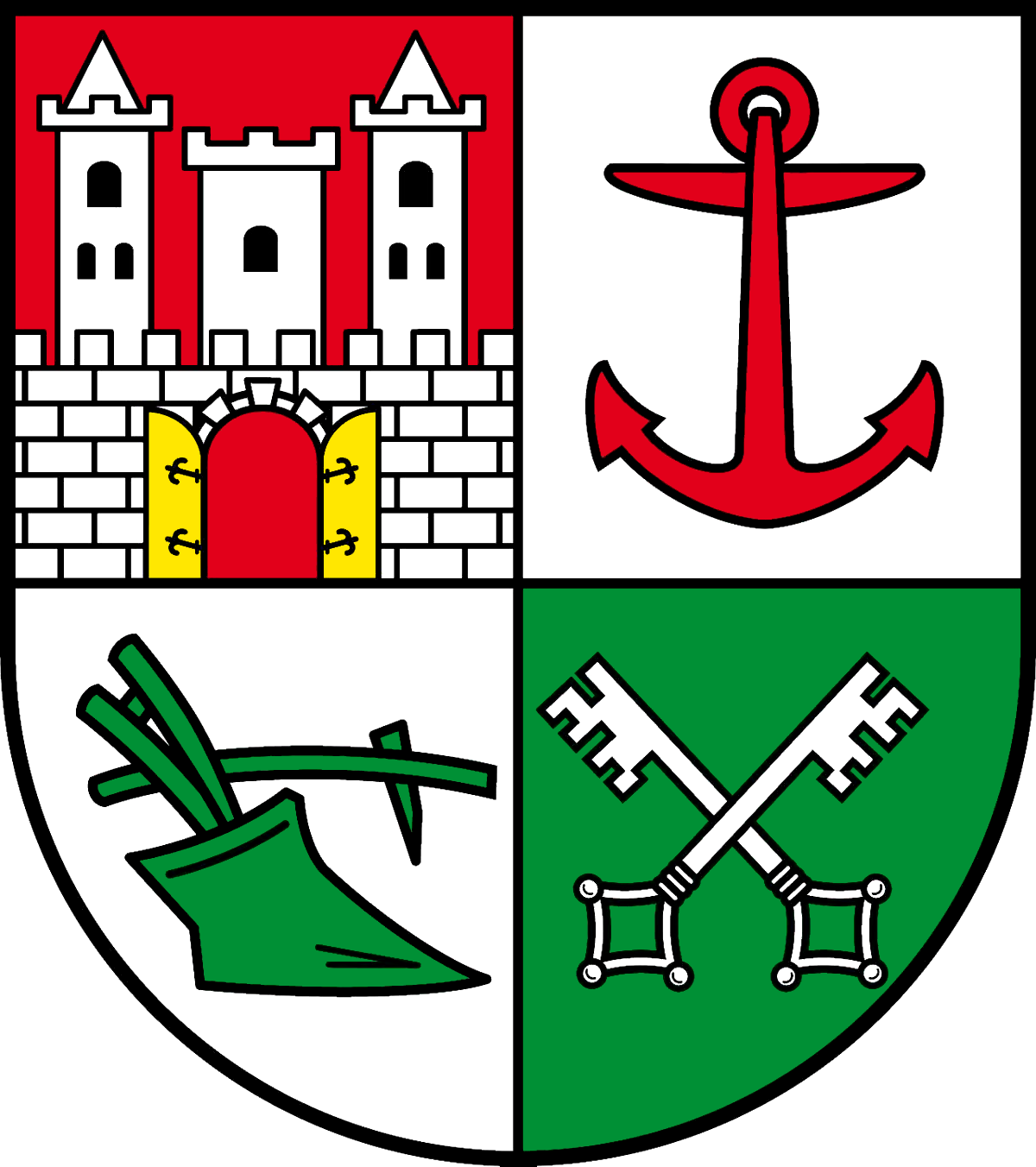
- Coat of arms

- Location of Wettin-Löbejün within Saalekreis district
- Interactive map of Wettin-Löbejün
- Location within Germany Location within Saxony-Anhalt
- Coordinates: 51°38′N 11°54′E
- Country: Germany
- State: Saxony-Anhalt
- District: Saalekreis

Government
  - Mayor (2017–24): Antje Klecar (Ind.)

Area
  - Total: 127.11 km^{2} (49.08 sq mi)
- Elevation: 161 m (528 ft)

Population (2025-12-31)
  - Total: 9,447
  - Density: 74.32/km^{2} (192.5/sq mi)
- Time zone: UTC+01:00 (CET)
  - Summer (DST): UTC+02:00 (CEST)
- Postal codes: 06193, 06198, 06420
- Dialling codes: 0345, 034603, 034607, 034691
- Vehicle registration: SK
- Website: www.stadt-wettin-loebejuen.de

Wettin-Löbejün (German pronunciation: [vɛˈtiːn løːbəˈjyːn]) is a town in the district Saalekreis, in Saxony-Anhalt, in east-central Germany. It was formed on 1 January 2011 by the amalgamation of the former municipalities Löbejün, Wettin, Brachwitz, Döblitz, Domnitz, Gimritz, Nauendorf, Neutz-Lettewitz, Plötz and Rothenburg. These former municipalities and Dößel are now the 11 Ortschaften or municipal divisions of the town.
