= Carl Loewe =

German composer and conductor (1796–1869)

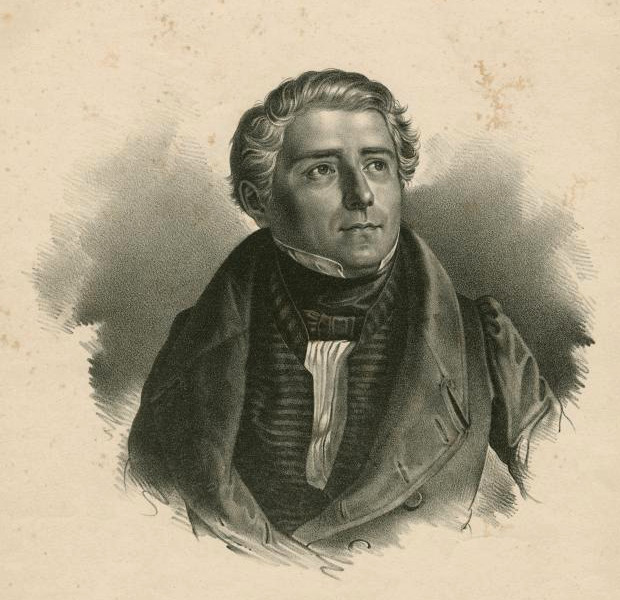
- Carl Loewe
- Born: Johann Carl Gottfried Loewe; 30 November 1796; Löbejün, Duchy of Magdeburg, Kingdom of Prussia
- Died: 20 April 1869 (aged 72); Kiel, Kingdom of Prussia
- Occupations: Composer, tenor singer and conductor

Johann Carl Gottfried Loewe (German: [ˈjoːhan kaʁl ˈɡɔtfʁiːt ˈløːvə]; 30 November 1796 – 20 April 1869), usually called Carl Loewe (sometimes seen as Karl Loewe), was a German composer, tenor singer and conductor from the late Classical and early Romantic periods. In his lifetime, his songs ("Balladen") were well enough known for some to call him the "Schubert of North Germany", and Hugo Wolf came to admire his work. He is less known today, but his ballads and songs, which number over 400, are occasionally performed.

== Life and career ==
Loewe was born in Löbejün in the Prussian Duchy of Magdeburg and received his first music lessons from his father. He was a choir-boy, first at Köthen, and later at Halle, where he went to grammar school. The beauty of Loewe's voice brought him under the notice of Madame de Staël, who procured him a pension from Jérôme Bonaparte, then king of Westphalia, which enabled him to further his education in music, and to study theology at Halle University. In 1810, he began lessons in Halle with Daniel Gottlob Türk. This ended in 1813, on the flight of the king.

In 1820, he moved to Stettin in Prussia (now Szczecin in Poland), where he worked as organist and music director of the school. It was while there that he did most of his work as a composer, publishing a version of Goethe's "Erlkönig" in 1824 (written 1817/18) which some say at least equals Schubert's better known version. He went on to set many other poets' works, including Friedrich Rückert, and translations of William Shakespeare and Lord Byron.

In 1821 he married Julie von Jacob, who died in 1823. His second wife, Auguste Lange, was an accomplished singer, and they appeared together in his oratorio performances with great success.

On 20 February 1827, he conducted the first performance of the 18-year-old Felix Mendelssohn's Overture A Midsummer Night's Dream, Op. 21. He and Mendelssohn were also soloists in Mendelssohn's Concerto in A-flat major for 2 pianos and orchestra.

Later in life, Loewe became very popular both as a composer and as a singer. As a youth, he had a high soprano voice (he could sing the music of the Queen of the Night in The Magic Flute as a boy), and his voice developed into a fine tenor. He made several tours as a singer in the 1840s and 1850s, visiting England, France, Sweden and Norway amongst other countries. He eventually moved back to Germany, and, after quitting his posts in Stettin after 46 years, moved to Kiel, where he would die from a stroke on 20 April 1869.

Loewe was also active as a music teacher. His most famous student, whom he taught composition from 1841 to 1847, was Emilie Mayer, of whom he said that "such a God-given talent as hers had not been bestowed upon any other person he knew". Mayer would later go on enjoying a successful career in Berlin as a freelance composer, ultimately earning her the nickname "weibliche Beethoven" (eng. female Beethoven).

== Works ==
Loewe wrote five operas, of which only one, Die drei Wünsche, was performed at Berlin in 1834, without much success; seventeen oratorios, many of them for male voices unaccompanied, or with short instrumental interludes only; choral ballads, cantatas, three string quartets (his opus 24,) and a pianoforte trio; a work for clarinet and piano, published posthumously; and some piano solos.

But the branch of his art by which he is remembered is the solo ballad with pianoforte accompaniment. His treatment of long narrative poems, in a clever mixture of the dramatic and lyrical styles, was undoubtedly modelled on the ballads of Johann Rudolf Zumsteeg, and has been copied by many composers since his day. His settings of the "Erlkönig" (a very early example), "Archibald Douglas" on a text by Theodor Fontane, "Heinrich der Vogler", "Edward" on a translation by Johann Gottfried Herder of a British ballad, and "Die verfallene Mühle", are particularly fine.

There are at least two symphonies by Loewe – one, in D minor, has been recorded on the Koch Schwann label together with the first of at least two CD recordings of Loewe's second piano concerto (in A major), and another, in E minor, was given its first performance in 170 years in November 2004. (The cpo series of recordings of Loewe's complete ballads includes as well a recording of two piano sonatas and a "tone poem in sonata form", with one of the sonatas – the E major of 1829 – having a vocal part for soprano and baritone.)

In 1875, at Bayreuth, Richard Wagner remarked of Loewe, "Ha, das ist ein ernster, mit Bedeutung die schöne deutsche Sprache behandelnder, nicht hoch genug zu ehrender deutscher Meister, echt und wahr!" (Ha, that is a serious German Master, authentic and true, one who uses the beautiful German language with meaning, one who cannot be sufficiently revered!).

== Style ==
Loewe's earliest songs, such as the Acht Jugenlieder and the Anakreontische Lieder, follow the musical pattern of the late 18th century tradition, using a single melodic line, basic accompaniment, and mostly strophic and varied strophic forms.

Under Zumsteeg's influence, Loewe began incorporating and cultivating the ballad form into his vocal songs. When compared to other Lieder composers, Loewe's rhapsodic composition style is said to have "a striking absence of organic musical development". His settings of poetry separated poetic ideas and treated them episodically rather than using unifying motifs (like fellow Lieder composer, Franz Schubert).

One of Loewe's strengths as a composer were his "imaginative and, at times, daring" accompaniments, which were often atmospheric and exploited the piano's sonorous and tonal potential.

== His heart ==
In 2012 an urn thought to contain the heart of Carl Loewe was found inside the Szczecin Cathedral's southern pillar during the renovation works carried out that year. A special commission appointed by the Szczecińsko-Kamieńska Metropolitan Curia has deduced, on the basis of historical records and an inscription on the pillar, that the urn indeed contains the heart of Carl Loewe.

== Recordings ==
- Carl Loewe: Ballads, Thomas Quasthoff, Norman Shetler; EMI Masters 1989
- Carl Loewe: Balladen & Lieder, 2 discs, Dietrich Fischer-Dieskau, Jörg Demus; Musical Heritage Society 1996
- Lieder & Balladen: Complete Edition, 21 discs, cpo 2007
