= Rothenburg Ferry =

German cable ferry

Coordinates: 51.640177°N 11.747003°E

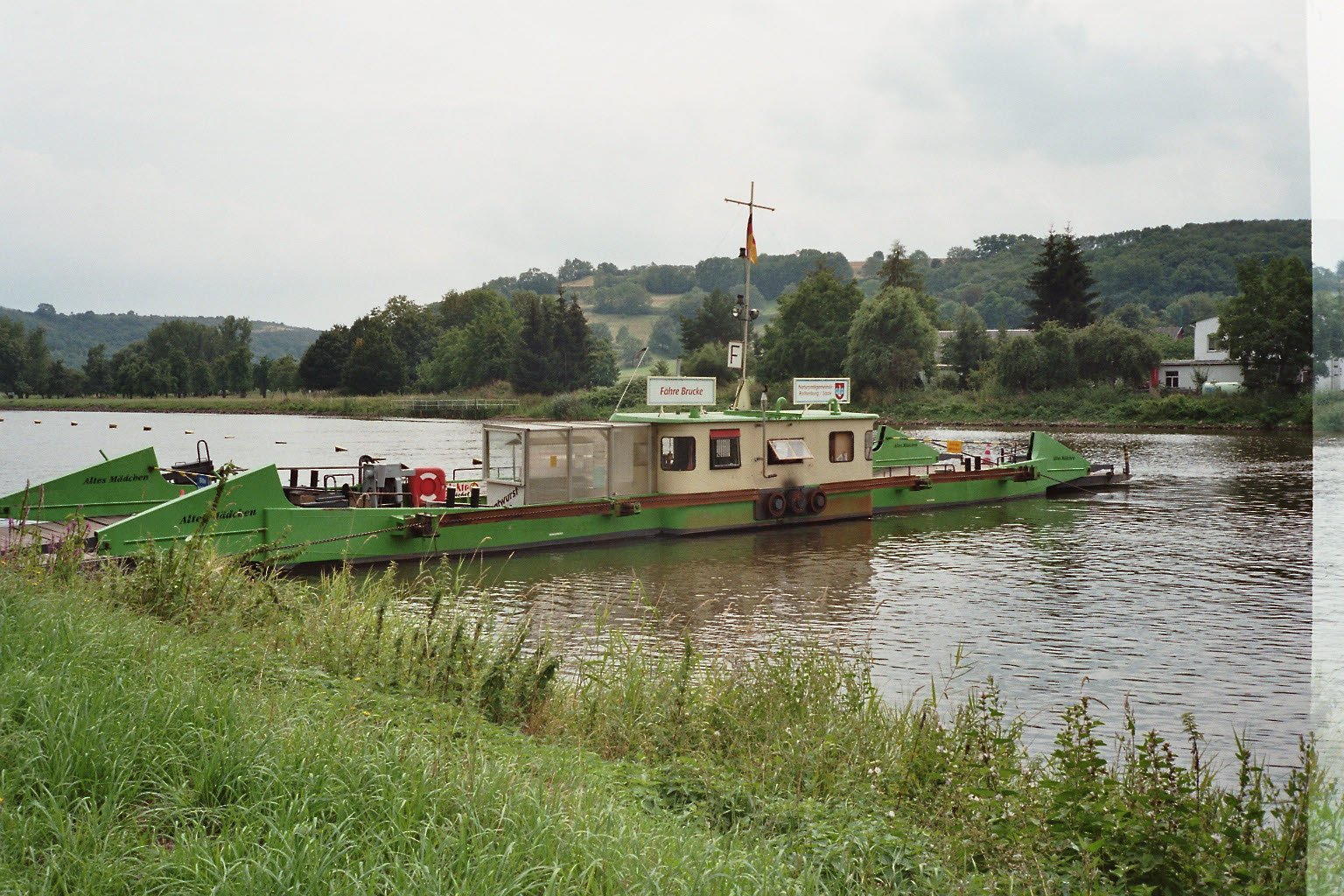
The Rothenburg Ferry.

The Rothenburg Ferry is a cable ferry across the Saale in Saxony-Anhalt, Germany. It connects the village of Rothenburg on the northwest end with the settlement Brucke which is part of the community Zickeritz on the southeast end. The ferry is 3.7 km apart from the next bridge downstream and upstream 11.1 km from another ferry.

The ferry was originally a reaction ferry propelled by the current of the water but today is powered by an engine working on a chain on the downstream side. Since October 2022 the service has been discontinued.
