= Höhnstedt =

- Ortsteil of Salzatal
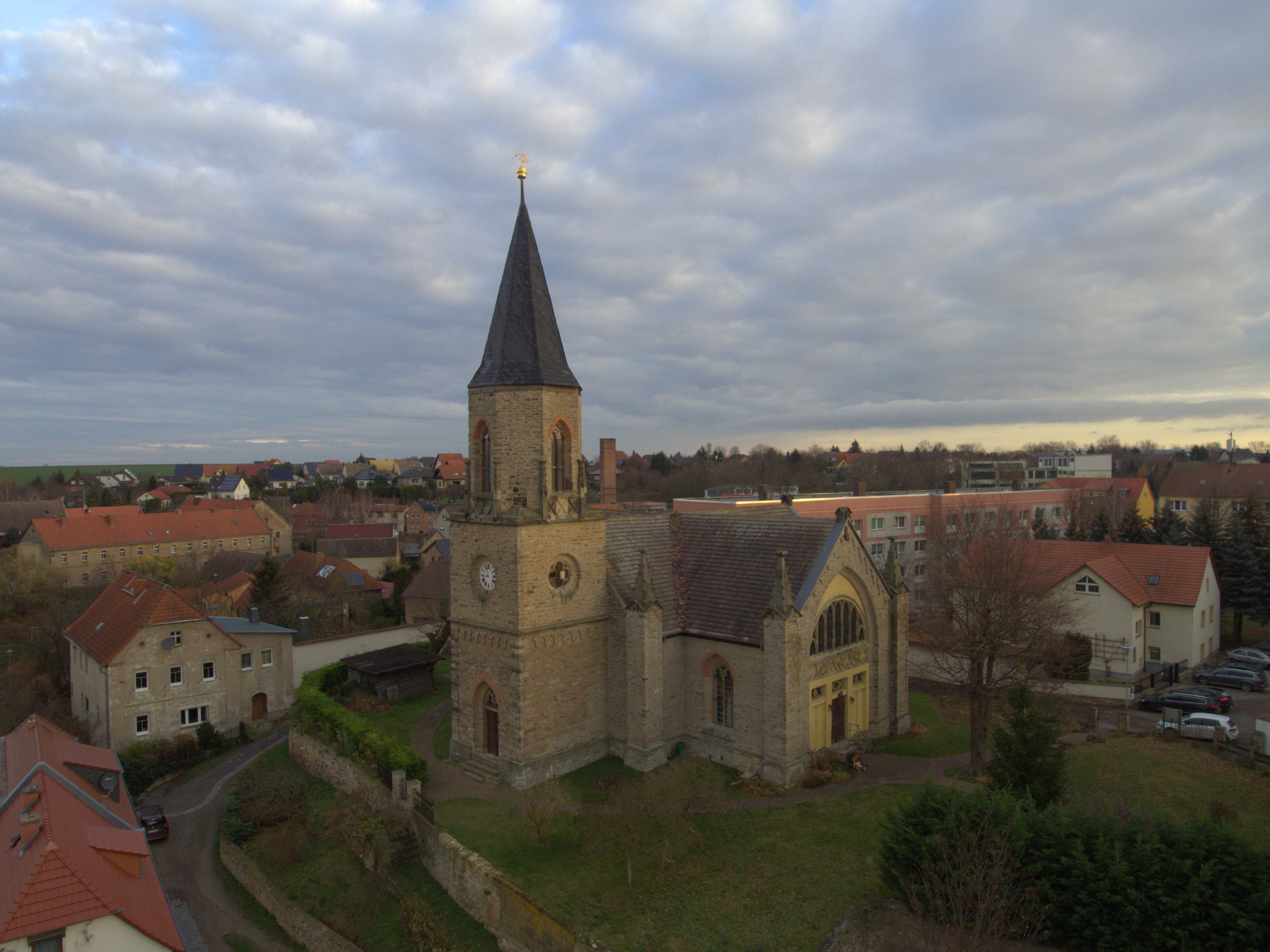
- Church of Saints Lucia and Ottilia

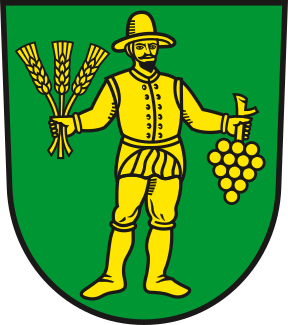
- Coat of arms
- Interactive map of Höhnstedt
- Location within Germany Location within Saxony-Anhalt
- Coordinates: 51°30′N 11°44′E
- Country: Germany
- State: Saxony-Anhalt
- District: Saalekreis
- Municipality: Salzatal

Area
  - Total: 14.05 km^{2} (5.42 sq mi)
- Elevation: 152 m (499 ft)

Population (2006-12-31)
  - Total: 1,584
  - Density: 112.7/km^{2} (292.0/sq mi)
- Time zone: UTC+01:00 (CET)
  - Summer (DST): UTC+02:00 (CEST)
- Postal codes: 06179
- Dialling codes: 034601
- Website: www.hoehnstedt.de

Höhnstedt is a village and a former municipality in the district Saalekreis, in Saxony-Anhalt, Germany.

Since 1 January 2010, it is part of the municipality Salzatal.
