= Plötz =

- Ortsteil of Wettin-Löbejün
- Interactive map of Plötz
- Location within Germany Location within Saxony-Anhalt
- Coordinates: 51°38′N 11°56′E
- Country: Germany
- State: Saxony-Anhalt
- District: Saalekreis
- Town: Wettin-Löbejün

Area
  - Total: 7.74 km^{2} (2.99 sq mi)
- Elevation: 87 m (285 ft)

Population (2009-12-31)
  - Total: 658
  - Density: 85.0/km^{2} (220/sq mi)
- Time zone: UTC+01:00 (CET)
  - Summer (DST): UTC+02:00 (CEST)
- Postal codes: 06193
- Dialling codes: 034606
- Vehicle registration: SK

Plötz (German pronunciation: [plœts]) is a village and a former municipality in the Saalekreis district, Saxony-Anhalt, Germany. Since 1 January 2011, it is part of the town Wettin-Löbejün.
