= Brachwitz =

- Ortsteil of Wettin-Löbejün
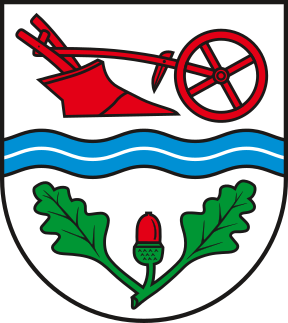
- Coat of arms
- Interactive map of Brachwitz
- Location within Germany Location within Saxony-Anhalt
- Coordinates: 51°32′13″N 11°52′15″E
- Country: Germany
- State: Saxony-Anhalt
- District: Saalekreis
- Town: Wettin-Löbejün

Area
  - Total: 8.34 km^{2} (3.22 sq mi)
- Elevation: 99 m (325 ft)

Population (2009-12-31)
  - Total: 988
  - Density: 118/km^{2} (307/sq mi)
- Time zone: UTC+01:00 (CET)
  - Summer (DST): UTC+02:00 (CEST)
- Postal codes: 06198
- Dialling codes: 0345
- Vehicle registration: SK

Brachwitz (German pronunciation: [ˈbʁaːxvɪts]) is a village and a former municipality in the Saalekreis district, Saxony-Anhalt, Germany. Since 1 January 2011, it is part of the town Wettin-Löbejün.
