= Domnitz =

- Ortsteil of Wettin-Löbejün
- Interactive map of Domnitz
- Location within Germany Location within Saxony-Anhalt
- Coordinates: 51°37′N 11°49′E
- Country: Germany
- State: Saxony-Anhalt
- District: Saalekreis
- Town: Wettin-Löbejün

Area
  - Total: 17.08 km^{2} (6.59 sq mi)
- Elevation: 143 m (469 ft)

Population (2009-12-31)
  - Total: 736
  - Density: 43.1/km^{2} (112/sq mi)
- Time zone: UTC+01:00 (CET)
  - Summer (DST): UTC+02:00 (CEST)
- Postal codes: 06420
- Dialling codes: 034603
- Vehicle registration: SK

Domnitz (German pronunciation: [ˈdoːmnɪts]) is a village and a former municipality in the Saalekreis district, Saxony-Anhalt, Germany. Since 1 January 2011, it is part of the town Wettin-Löbejün.
