= Löbejün =

- Ortsteil of Wettin-Löbejün
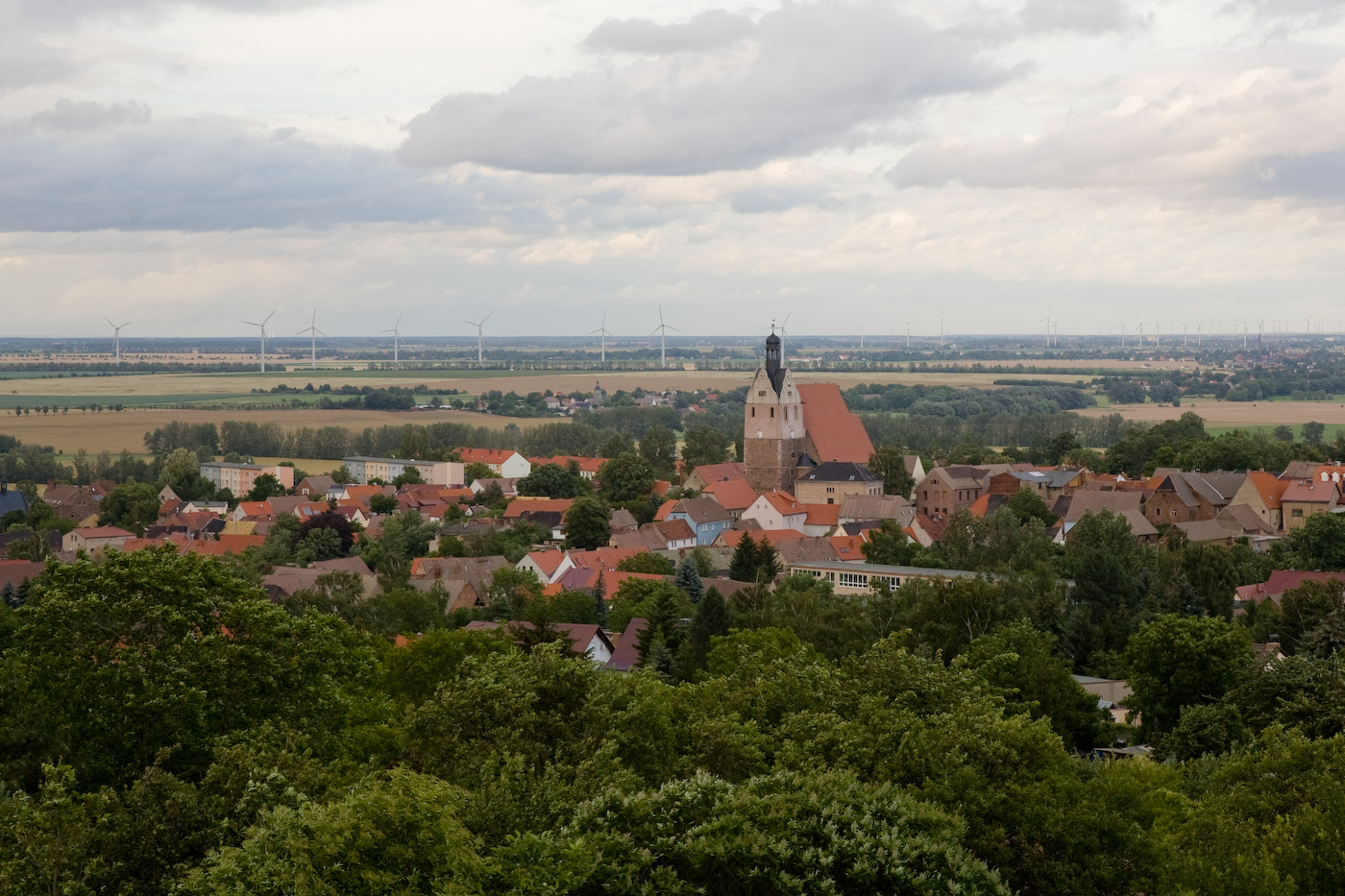
- General view of Löbejün

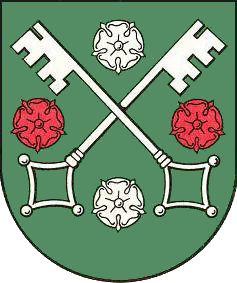
- Coat of arms
- Interactive map of Löbejün
- Location within Germany Location within Saxony-Anhalt
- Coordinates: 51°38′N 11°54′E
- Country: Germany
- State: Saxony-Anhalt
- District: Saalekreis
- Town: Wettin-Löbejün

Area
  - Total: 20.52 km^{2} (7.92 sq mi)
- Elevation: 161 m (528 ft)

Population (2009-12-31)
  - Total: 2,247
  - Density: 109.5/km^{2} (283.6/sq mi)
- Time zone: UTC+01:00 (CET)
  - Summer (DST): UTC+02:00 (CEST)
- Postal codes: 06193
- Dialling codes: 034603
- Vehicle registration: SK
- Website: www.stadt-loebejuen.de

Löbejün (German pronunciation: [løːbəˈjyːn]) is a former town in the Saalekreis in Saxony-Anhalt, Germany. Since 1 January 2011, it is part of the town Wettin-Löbejün.

== Geography ==
=== Geographic location ===
Löbejün is located 15 km (9.3 mi) north of Halle (Saale). The town is located in a hilly area in which a tributary to the Saale River, the Fuhne, flows.

=== Geology ===
The town is known for its Löbejüner porphyry. In the northeastern part of the town coal beds are found.

=== City classification ===
The following towns are classified as part of Löbejün:

- Gottgau
- Schlettau

== History ==
Löbejün was first recognized in 961 as Liubichun.

=== Population development ===
Year or date	Population
Middle Ages ¹	~5-600
Beginning of the 17th century ¹	~1.000
1636 ¹	96
1719 ¹	909
1782 ¹	1.299
1822 ¹	2.100
1853 ¹	3.100
1861 ¹	3.497
1880 ¹	3.425
1900 ¹	3.332
1919 ¹	2.802
1935 ¹	3.279

Date	Population
3. October 1990 ²	2.640
31. December 1995 ²	2.558
31. December 2000 ²	2.443
31. December 2001 ²	2.425
31. December 2002 ²	2.393
31. December 2003 ²	2.364
31. December 2004 ²	2.355

² Source: Statistisches Landesamt Sachsen-Anhalt

=== Industrial development ===
Since 1518 (when the quarry was first mentioned) porphyry was processed. In circa 1622 the coal mine was founded. The coal mine reached peak production in the 18th century, when it had 27 mine shafts. It closed in 1884.

== Politics ==
Löbejün was part of the Verwaltungsgemeinschaft Saalkreis Nord until 2011.

=== Mayor ===
The last mayor of Löbejün was Thomas Madl (CDU), who was in office from 1990 until 1994, and from 1995 until the formation of Wettin-Löbejün in 2011.

=== City emblem ===
The city shield consists of a green background with two silver key with their teeth pointed outwards. Four roses (the upper and lower, silver, and the ones on the side, red) are also found on the shield.

=== Partner cities ===
- Schifferstadt (since 2002)

== Culture and monuments ==
=== Museums ===
- Heimatmuseum im Halleschen Tor

=== Music ===
The Internationale Carl-Loewe-Gesellschaft e. V. (International Carl Loewe Society) holds concerts and events related to the composer Carl Loewe.

== Economy and infrastructure ==
=== Long-time companies present in Löbejün ===
In Löbejün porphyry is removed from the ground. Often used as fill in building roads, it is also used in home construction and also in the city wall, the Hallesche Tor and other buildings in the city.

== Famous people ==
The composer Carl Loewe was born on 30 November 1796 in Löbejün. The birthplace of Loewe was torn down in 1886. In the place of the house, near the Church of St. Petri, the Alte Schule (the old school) (today: Carl Loewe-Haus) was built.

== Literature ==
- Siegmar von Schultze-Galléra: Wanderungen durch den Saalkreis (Journeys through the region surrounding Halle), Halle 1921
