= Döblitz =

- Ortsteil of Wettin-Löbejün
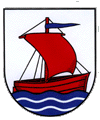
- Coat of arms
- Interactive map of Döblitz
- Location within Germany Location within Saxony-Anhalt
- Coordinates: 51°33′27″N 11°49′49″E
- Country: Germany
- State: Saxony-Anhalt
- District: Saalekreis
- Town: Wettin-Löbejün

Area
  - Total: 6.24 km^{2} (2.41 sq mi)
- Elevation: 94 m (308 ft)

Population (2009-12-31)
  - Total: 162
  - Density: 26.0/km^{2} (67.2/sq mi)
- Time zone: UTC+01:00 (CET)
  - Summer (DST): UTC+02:00 (CEST)
- Postal codes: 06193
- Dialling codes: 034607
- Vehicle registration: SK

Döblitz (German pronunciation: [ˈdøːblɪts]) is a village and a former municipality in the Saalekreis district, Saxony-Anhalt, Germany. Since 1 January 2011, it has been part of the town of Wettin-Löbejün.

Its historical and cultural society Förderverein Kultur und Geschichte Döblitz e.V. volunteers in preserving an old Romanesque church to maintain the cultural heritage and to offer cultural events to the community and to the region throughout the year.

== Geography ==
Döblitz is located in the nature reserve "Unteres Saaltal" in the north-west of Halle (Saale).

== History ==
=== History ===
The village of Döblitz was first mentioned in 1286 in a deed of gift, in which it is called Dobelicz. Founded on the banks of the river Saale, it used to be a fishing village. Like many other settlements to the east of the Saale, Döblitz is of Slavic origin.

=== Coat of arms ===
The coat of arms was approved by the Regierungspräsidium Halle on 4 May 1999. It shows a red sailing boat with a blue pennant. The vessel is sailing on blue water with two silver waves. The background of the coat of arms is also silver.

== Literature ==
- Siegmar von Schultze-Galléra: Wanderungen durch den Saalkreis (Band 2), Halle 1914

== Gallery ==
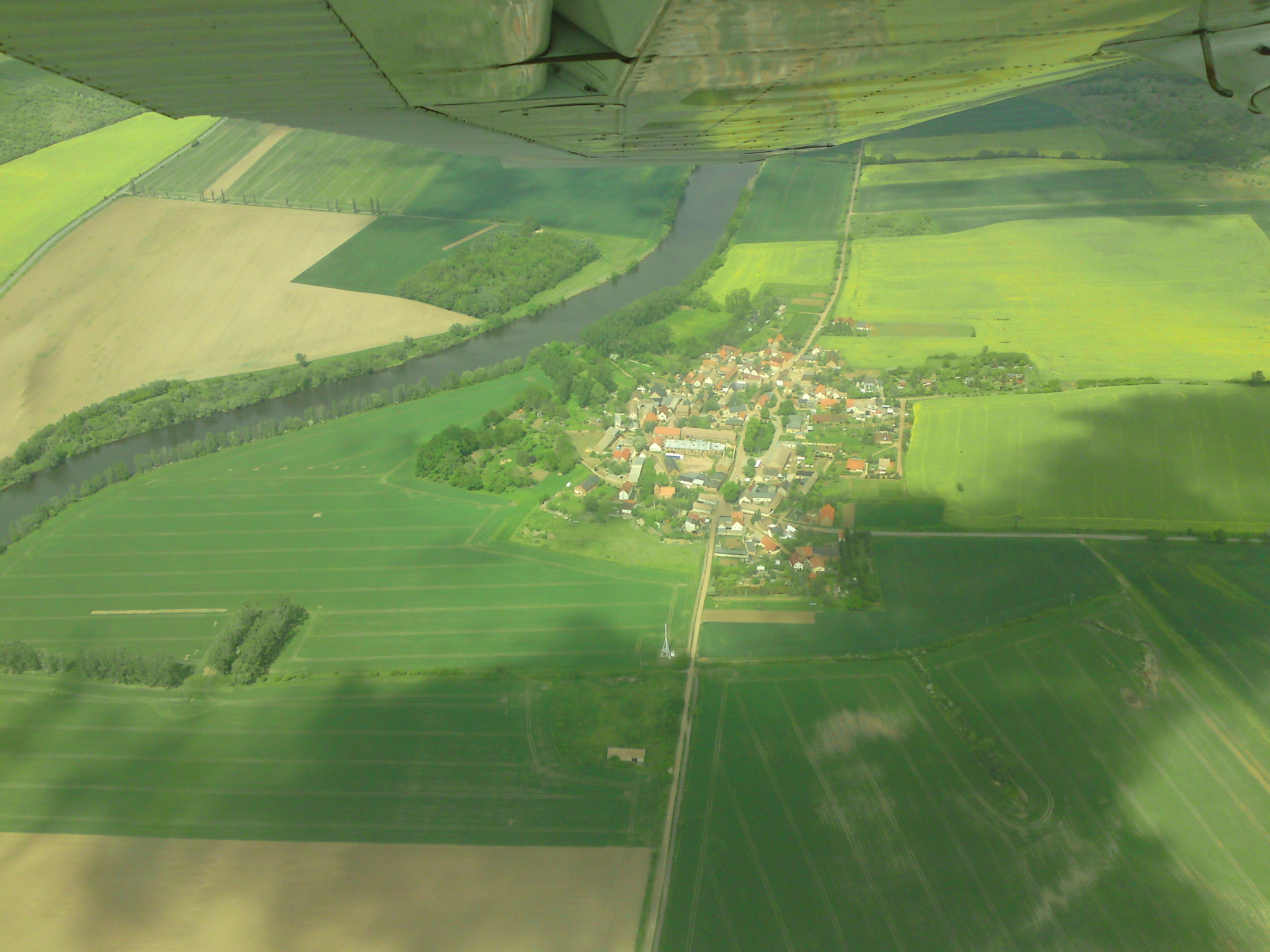
Aerial photograph of Döblitz

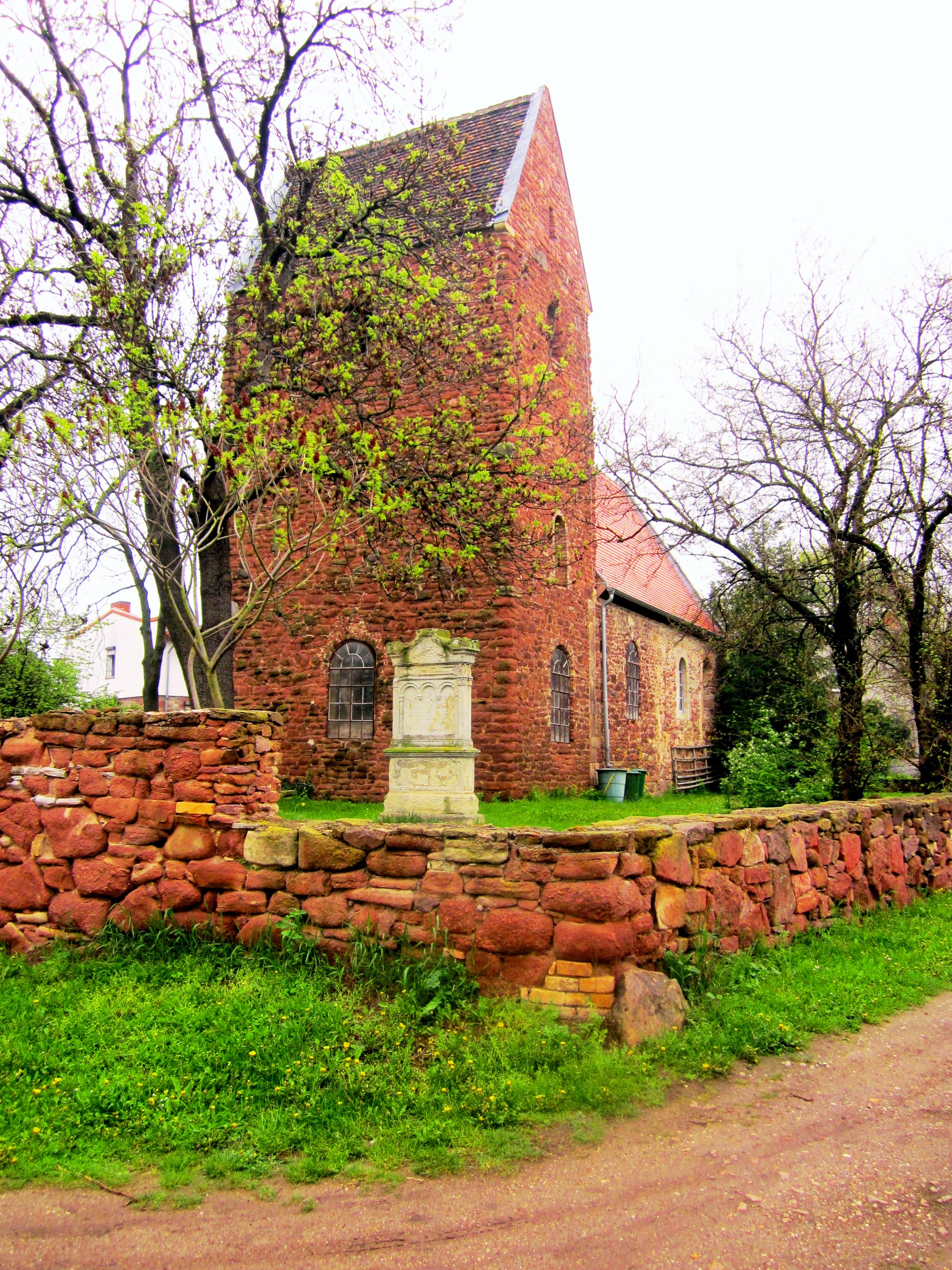
Little old church

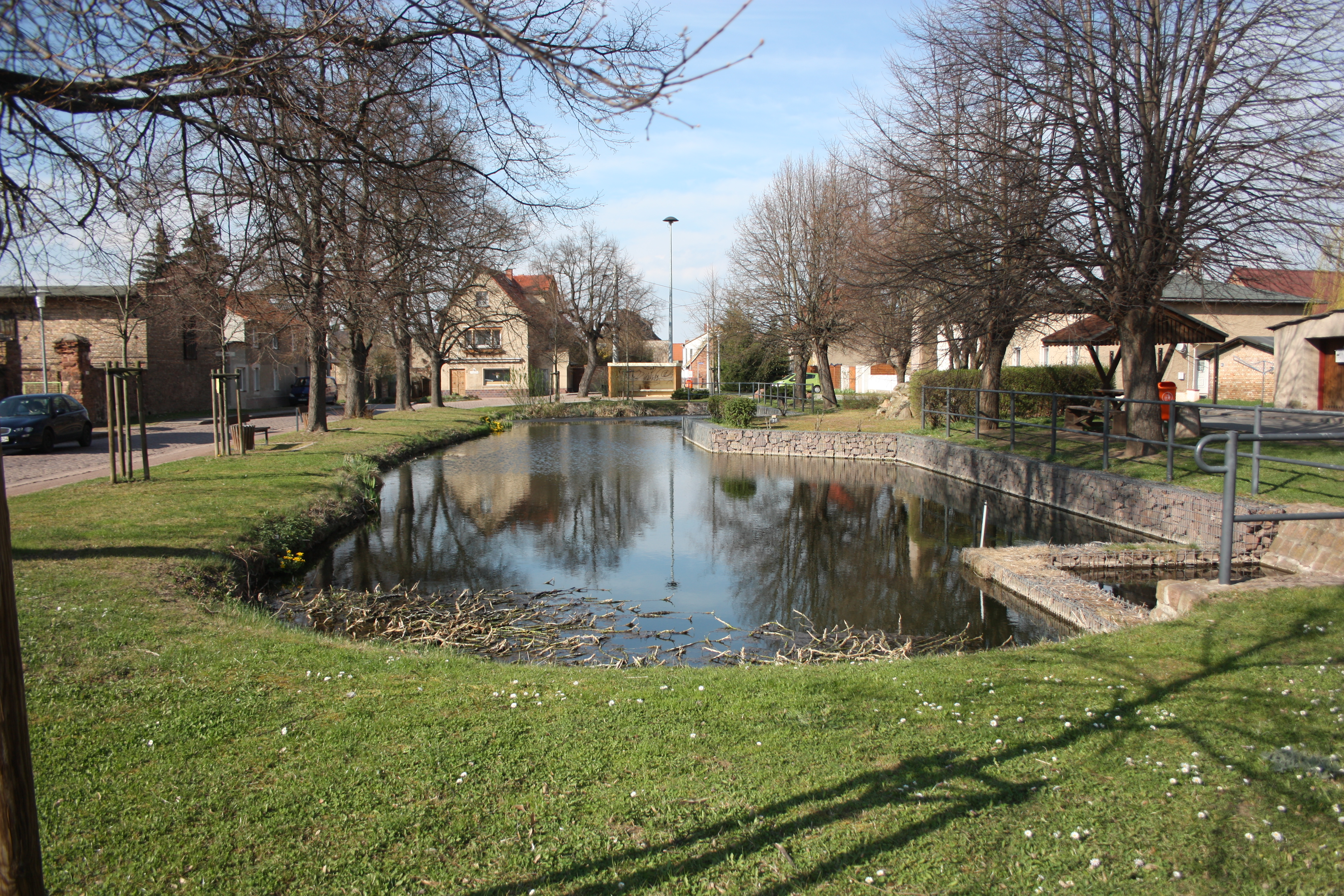
Village pond in the centre of Döblitz
