= Rothenburg, Saxony-Anhalt =

Rothenburg
- Ortsteil of Wettin-Löbejün
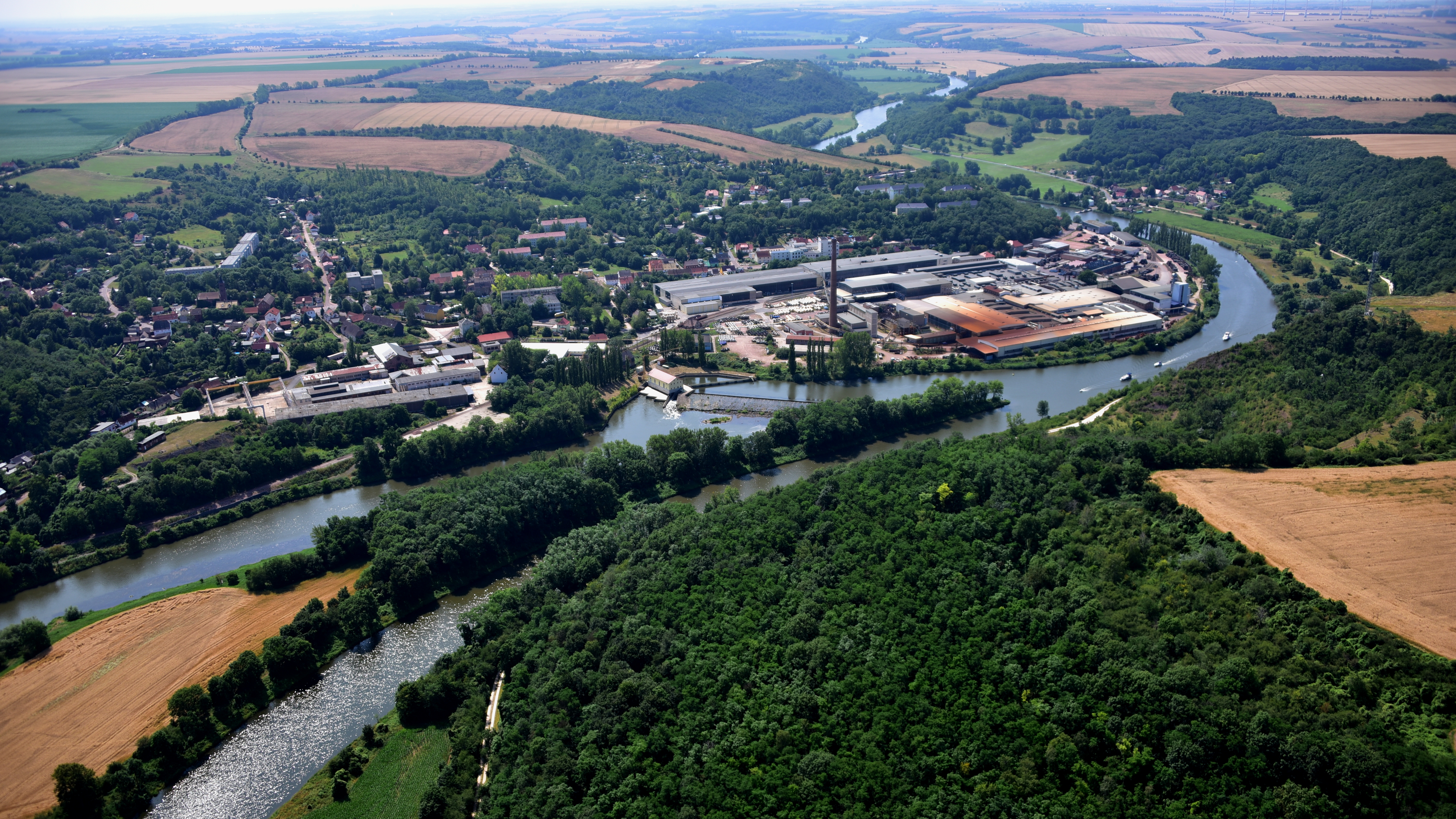
- Aerial view

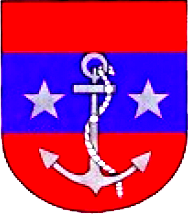
- Coat of arms
- Interactive map of Rothenburg
- Location within Germany Location within Saxony-Anhalt
- Coordinates: 51°38′45″N 11°45′25″E
- Country: Germany
- State: Saxony-Anhalt
- District: Saalekreis
- Town: Wettin-Löbejün

Area
  - Total: 5.4 km^{2} (2.1 sq mi)
- Elevation: 130 m (430 ft)

Population (2009-12-31)
  - Total: 796
  - Density: 150/km^{2} (380/sq mi)
- Time zone: UTC+01:00 (CET)
  - Summer (DST): UTC+02:00 (CEST)
- Postal codes: 06420
- Dialling codes: 034691
- Vehicle registration: SK
- Website: www.rothenburg-saalekreis.de

Rothenburg (German pronunciation: [ˈʁoːtn̩bʊʁk]) is a village and a former municipality in the Saalekreis district, Saxony-Anhalt, in east-central Germany. Since 1 January 2011, it is part of the town Wettin-Löbejün. The Rothenburg Ferry, a cable ferry, crosses the Saale river at Rothenburg.

== History ==
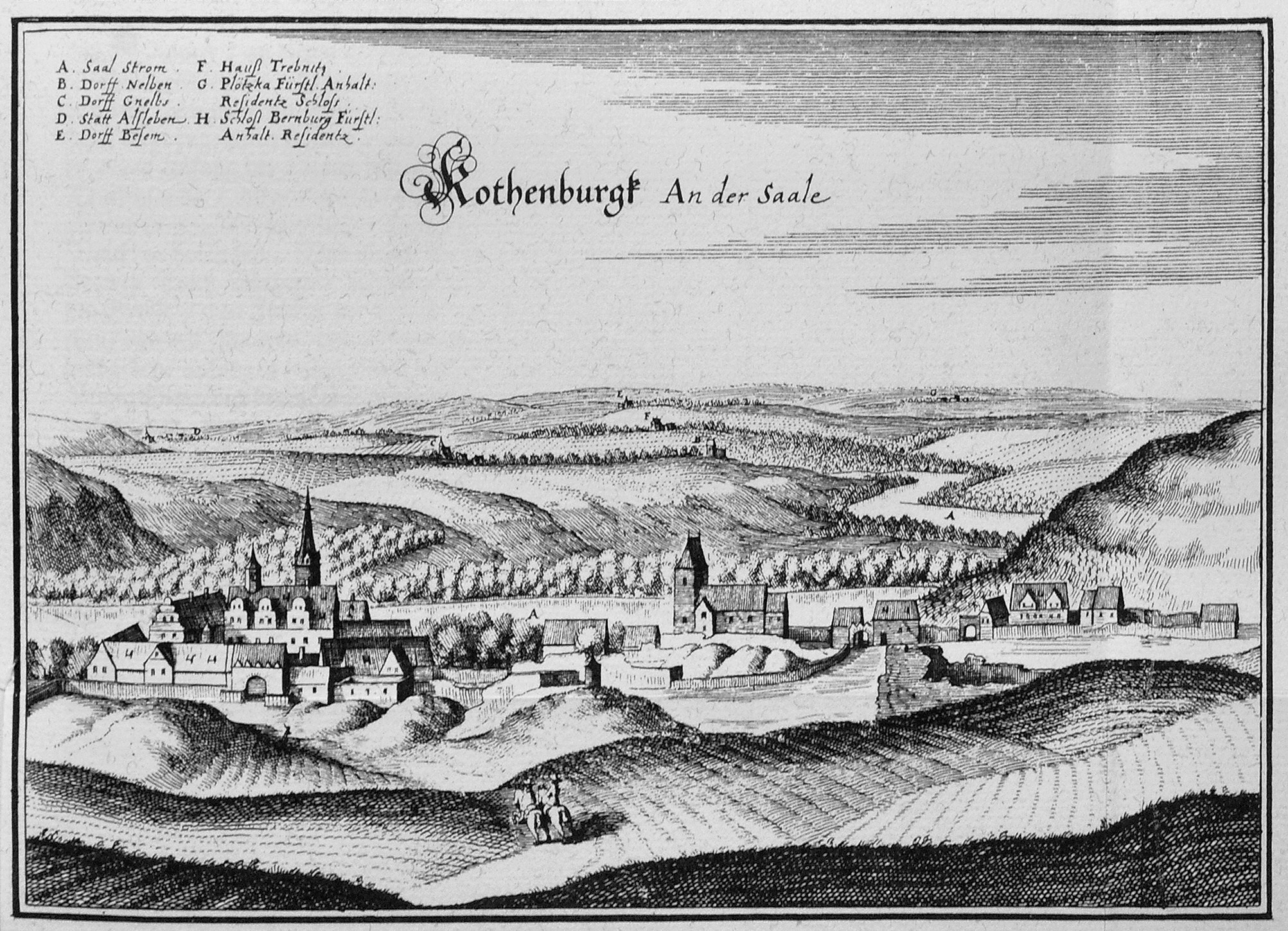
17th-century view of Rothenburg

Under Nazi Germany, it was the location of forced labour subcamps of the prison in Halle (Saale) and of the forced labour "education" camp in Spergau.

After World War II, it was part of the Soviet occupation zone in Germany and East Germany until 1990.
