= Nauendorf (Wettin-Löbejün) =

- Ortsteil of Wettin-Löbejün
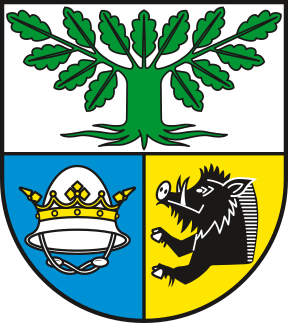
- Coat of arms
- Interactive map of Nauendorf
- Location within Germany Location within Saxony-Anhalt
- Coordinates: 51°36′10″N 11°53′5″E
- Country: Germany
- State: Saxony-Anhalt
- District: Saalekreis
- Town: Wettin-Löbejün

Area
  - Total: 11.52 km^{2} (4.45 sq mi)
- Elevation: 144 m (472 ft)

Population (2009-12-31)
  - Total: 1,761
  - Density: 152.9/km^{2} (395.9/sq mi)
- Time zone: UTC+01:00 (CET)
  - Summer (DST): UTC+02:00 (CEST)
- Postal codes: 06193
- Dialling codes: 034603
- Vehicle registration: SK

Nauendorf (German pronunciation: [ˈnaʊəndɔʁf]) is a village and a former municipality in the Saalekreis district, Saxony-Anhalt, Germany. Since 1 January 2011, it is part of the town Wettin-Löbejün.
