= Christian Reuter =

German author

Christian Reuter (1665 in Kütten – 1712 or later) was a German author.

== Work ==
He was especially effective in character delineation. In his L'honnête femme; oder die ehrliche Frau zu Pfissine (“The honest woman of Pfissine,” 1695), he skillfully uses Molière's fable in Les précieuses ridicules. His chief work is the novel Schelmuffskys Reisebeschreibung (“Schelmuffsky's trip description,” 1696), which was edited by Schullerus in 1885, and his other writings include Der ehrlichen Frau Schlampampe Krankheit und Tod (“Illness and death of the honest Frau Schlampampe,” 1696) and Letztes Denk- und Ehrenmahl der Frau Schlampampe (“Last monument to Frau Schlampampe,” 1697), which were republished in 1890.
