= Gimritz =

- Ortsteil of Wettin-Löbejün
- Interactive map of Gimritz
- Location within Germany Location within Saxony-Anhalt
- Coordinates: 51°34′N 11°52′E
- Country: Germany
- State: Saxony-Anhalt
- District: Saalekreis
- Town: Wettin-Löbejün

Area
  - Total: 7.67 km^{2} (2.96 sq mi)
- Elevation: 151 m (495 ft)

Population (2009-12-31)
  - Total: 345
  - Density: 45.0/km^{2} (116/sq mi)
- Time zone: UTC+01:00 (CET)
  - Summer (DST): UTC+02:00 (CEST)
- Postal codes: 06198
- Dialling codes: 034607
- Vehicle registration: SK

Gimritz (German pronunciation: [ˈɡɪmʁɪts]) is a village and a former municipality in the Saalekreis district, Saxony-Anhalt, Germany. Since 1 January 2011, it is part of the town Wettin-Löbejün.
