= Neutz-Lettewitz =

- Ortsteil of Wettin-Löbejün
- Interactive map of Neutz-Lettewitz
- Location within Germany Location within Saxony-Anhalt
- Coordinates: 51°36′22″N 11°50′28″E
- Country: Germany
- State: Saxony-Anhalt
- District: Saalekreis
- Town: Wettin-Löbejün

Area
  - Total: 15.22 km^{2} (5.88 sq mi)
- Elevation: 144 m (472 ft)

Population (2009-12-31)
  - Total: 886
  - Density: 58.2/km^{2} (151/sq mi)
- Time zone: UTC+01:00 (CET)
  - Summer (DST): UTC+02:00 (CEST)
- Postal codes: 06193
- Dialling codes: 034603
- Vehicle registration: SK

Neutz-Lettewitz (German pronunciation: [ˈnɔʏts ˈlɛtəvɪts]) is a village and a former municipality in the Saalekreis district, Saxony-Anhalt, Germany. Since 1 January 2011, it is part of the town Wettin-Löbejün.
