= Salzatal =

- Municipality
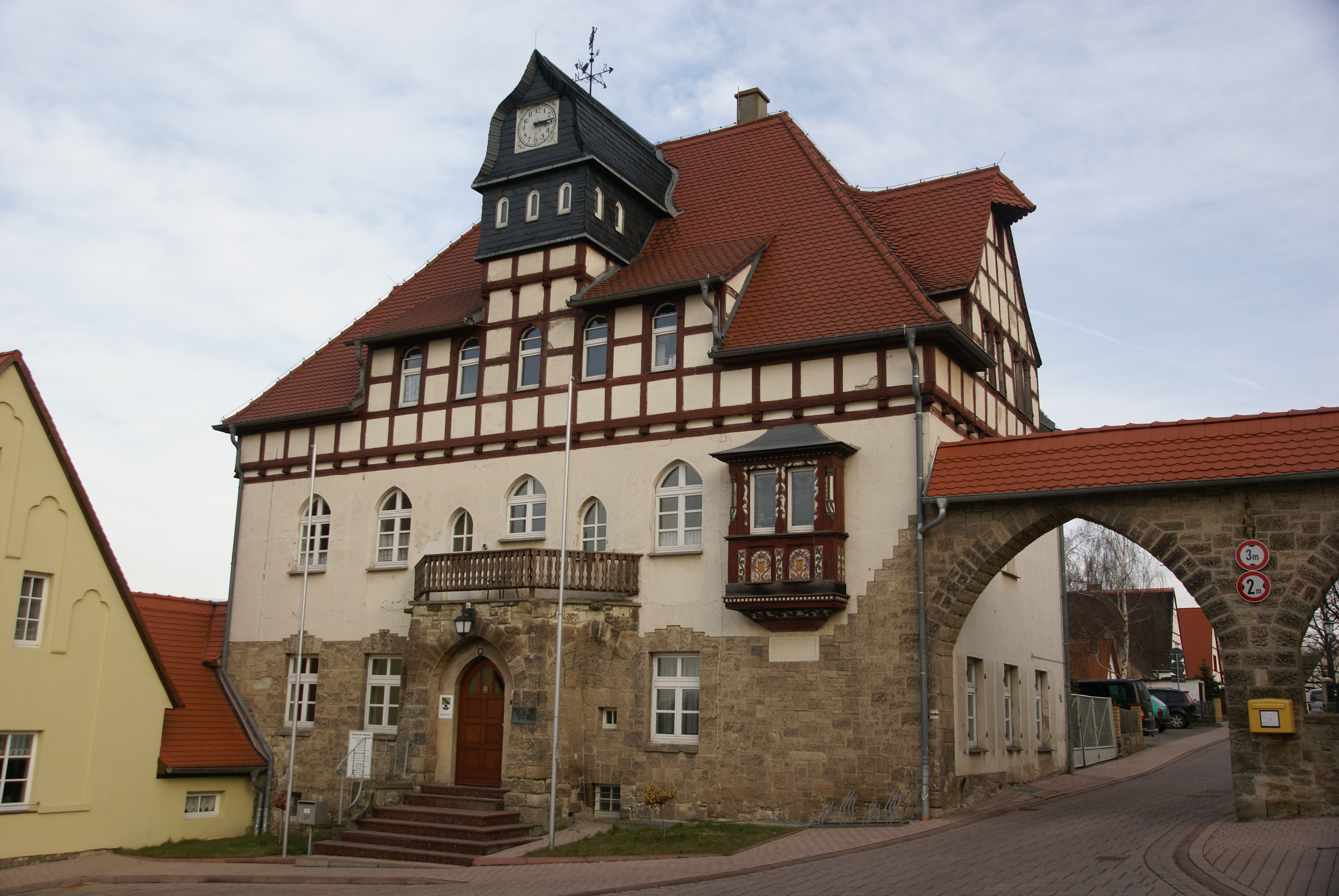
- Town hall in Salzmünde

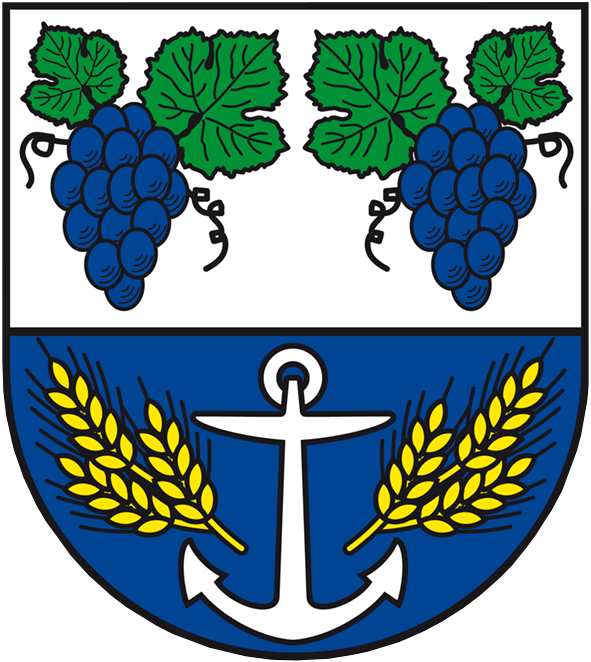
- Coat of arms

- Location of Salzatal within Saalekreis district
- Interactive map of Salzatal
- Location within Germany Location within Saxony-Anhalt
- Coordinates: 51°32′N 11°50′E
- Country: Germany
- State: Saxony-Anhalt
- District: Saalekreis
- Subdivisions: 21

Government
  - Mayor (2024–31): Ina Zimmermann

Area
  - Total: 109.38 km^{2} (42.23 sq mi)
- Elevation: 123 m (404 ft)

Population (2025-12-31)
  - Total: 11,177
  - Density: 102.19/km^{2} (264.66/sq mi)
- Time zone: UTC+01:00 (CET)
  - Summer (DST): UTC+02:00 (CEST)
- Postal codes: 06120, 06179, 06198
- Dialling codes: 0345, 034601, 034607, 034609, 034773
- Vehicle registration: SK

Salzatal is a municipality in the Saalekreis district, Saxony-Anhalt, Germany. It was formed on 1 January 2010 by the merger of the former municipalities Beesenstedt, Bennstedt, Fienstedt, Höhnstedt, Kloschwitz, Lieskau, Salzmünde, Schochwitz and Zappendorf.
