= Petersberg, Saxony-Anhalt =

Petersberg
- Municipality
- Coat of arms

- Location of Petersberg within Saalekreis district
- Interactive map of Petersberg
- Location within Germany Location within Saxony-Anhalt
- Coordinates: 51°36′N 11°58′E
- Country: Germany
- State: Saxony-Anhalt
- District: Saalekreis
- Subdivisions: 2

Government
  - Mayor (2020–27): Ronny Krimm

Area
  - Total: 102.68 km^{2} (39.64 sq mi)
- Elevation: 153 m (502 ft)

Population (2025-12-31)
  - Total: 9,221
  - Density: 89.80/km^{2} (232.6/sq mi)
- Time zone: UTC+01:00 (CET)
  - Summer (DST): UTC+02:00 (CEST)
- Postal codes: 06188, 06193
- Dialling codes: 034600, 034602, 034603, 034604, 034606
- Vehicle registration: SK
- Website: www.gemeinde-petersberg.de

Petersberg (German pronunciation: [ˈpeːtɐsˌbɛʁk]) is a municipality in the Saalekreis district, Saxony-Anhalt, Germany. In January 2010 it absorbed the former municipalities Brachstedt, Götschetal, Krosigk, Kütten, Morl and Ostrau.

== Geography ==
The municipality Petersberg consists of the following 11 Ortschaften or municipal divisions:

- Brachstedt
- Gutenberg
- Krosigk
- Kütten
- Morl
- Nehlitz
- Ostrau
- Petersberg
- Sennewitz
- Teicha
- Wallwitz
