= Saalekreis =

Coordinates: 51°24′N 11°50′E

- District
- Flag Coat of arms
- Country: Germany
- State: Saxony-Anhalt
- Capital: Merseburg

Government
  - District admin.: Hartmut Handschak

Area
  - Total: 1,434.2 km^{2} (553.7 sq mi)

Population (31 December 2024)
  - Total: 182,451
  - Density: 130/km^{2} (330/sq mi)
- Time zone: UTC+01:00 (CET)
  - Summer (DST): UTC+02:00 (CEST)
- Vehicle registration: SK, MER, MQ, QFT
- Website: www.saalekreis.de

Saalekreis is a district in Saxony-Anhalt, Germany. The district seat is Merseburg. Its area is 1,434.2 km^{2} (553.7 sq mi). It is bounded by (from the west and clockwise) the districts Kyffhäuserkreis (Thuringia), Mansfeld-Südharz, Salzlandkreis, Anhalt-Bitterfeld, Nordsachsen, Leipzig (both Saxony) and Burgenlandkreis. The district-free city of Halle is surrounded by the Saalekreis.

== History ==
The district was established by merging the former districts of Merseburg-Querfurt and Saalkreis as part of the district reform of 2007.

== Towns and municipalities ==
Clickable map of towns and municipalities in the district

The district Saalekreis consists of the following subdivisions:

Free towns	Free municipalities	Verbandsgemeinde
1. Bad Dürrenberg; 2. Bad Lauchstädt; 3. Braunsbedra; 4. Landsberg; 5. Wettin-Löbejün; 6. Merseburg; 7. Mücheln; 8. Querfurt	1. Kabelsketal; 2. Leuna; 3. Petersberg; 4. Salzatal; 5. Schkopau; 6. Teutschenthal	Weida-Land: 1. Barnstädt; 2. Farnstädt; 3. Nemsdorf-Göhrendorf^{1}; 4. Obhausen; 5. Schraplau^{2}; 6. Steigra
^{1}seat of the Verbandsgemeinde; ^{2}town
