= Saale =

River in Germany

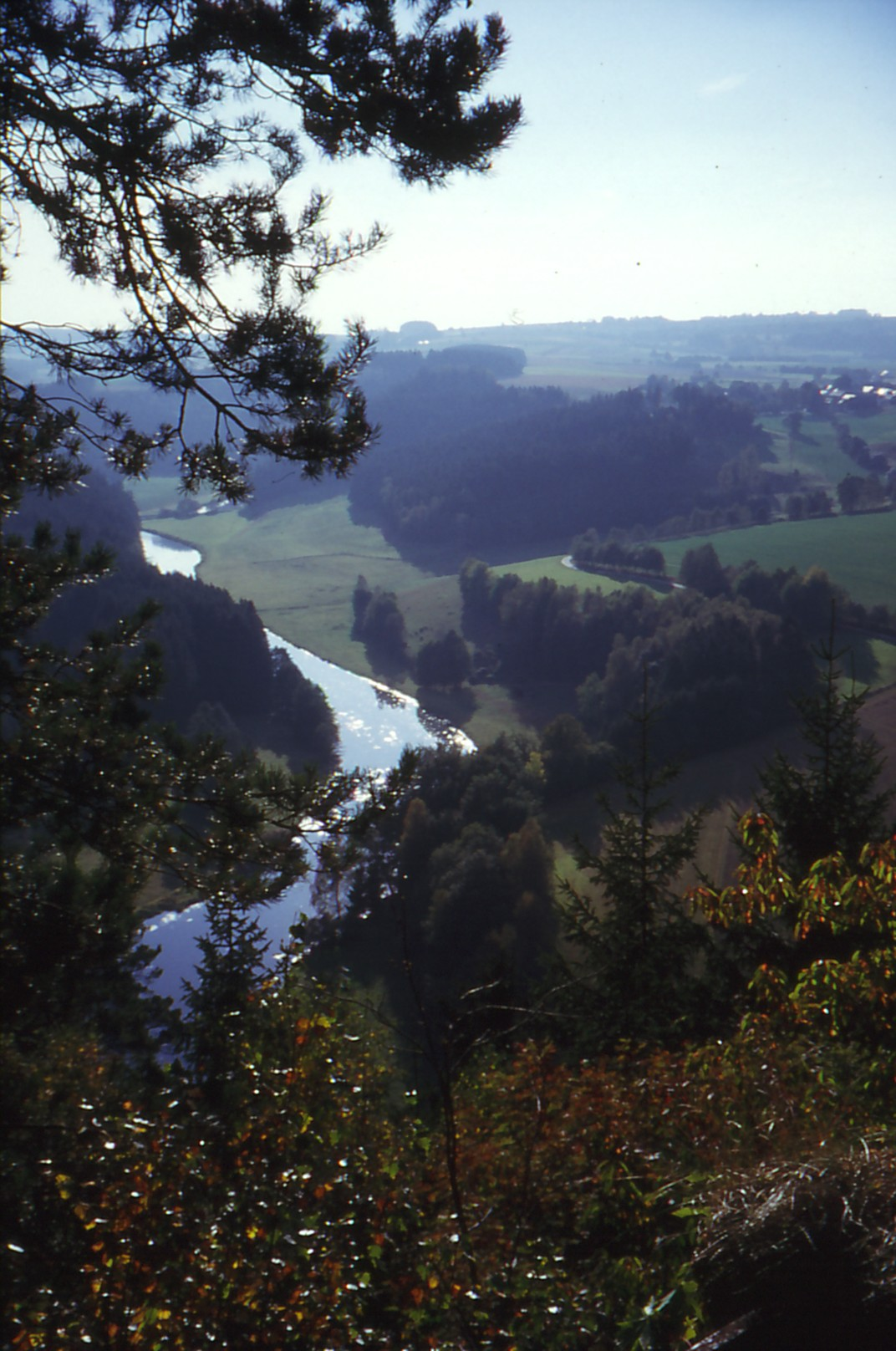
- The Saale valley near Hof

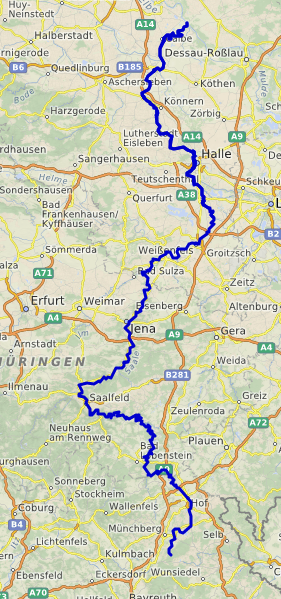
- The Saale has its source in the Fichtel Mountains in northeastern Franconia (Bavaria) and flows into the Elbe at Barby, Saxony-Anhalt.

Location
- Country: Germany
- States: Bavaria; Thuringia; Saxony-Anhalt
- Reference no.: DE: 56

Physical characteristics
- Source
  - location: near Zell im Fichtelgebirge
  - coordinates: 50°07′14″N 11°49′50″E
  - elevation: 728 m above sea level (NN)
- Mouth
  - location: near Barby into the Elbe
  - coordinates: 51°57′17″N 11°54′50″E
  - elevation: 49.5 m above sea level (NN)
- Length: 413 km (257 mi)
- Basin size: 24,167 km^{2} (9,331 mi^{2})
- Discharge
  - average: 115 m^{3}/s (4,100 cu ft/s)

Basin features
- Progression: Elbe→ North Sea
- Landmarks: Cities: Jena, Halle (Saale); Large towns: Hof (Saale), Saalfeld/Saale, Rudolstadt, Naumburg (Saale), Weißenfels, Merseburg, Bernburg (Saale)
- Tributaries
  - left: Schwarza, Ilm, Unstrut, Salza, Wipper, Bode
  - right: White Elster, Orla, Southern and Northern Regnitz
- Bridges: Saale bridge, Rudolphstein, Old Saale bridge, Jena-Burgau
- Inland ports: Hafen Halle (Saale), Sophienhafen in Halle (Saale)
- Navigable: From its mouth to Bad Dürrenberg; for Europa ships to Halle-Trotha

The Saale (German pronunciation: [ˈzaːlə]), also known as the Saxon Saale (German: Sächsische Saale pronounced [ˈzɛksɪʃə ˈzaːlə]) and Thuringian Saale (German: Thüringische Saale), is a river in Germany and a left-bank tributary of the Elbe. It is distinguished from the smaller Franconian Saale, a right-bank tributary of the Main, or the Saale in Lower Saxony, a tributary of the Leine.

== Etymology ==
The name Saale comes from the Proto-Indo-European root *séles 'marsh', akin to Welsh hêl, heledd 'river meadow', Cornish heyl 'estuary', Greek hélos 'marsh, meadow', Sanskrit sáras 'lake, pond', Sárasvati 'sacred river', Old Persian Harauvati 'Hārūt River; Arachosia', Avestan Haraxvatī, idem. It may also be related to the Indo-European root *sal, "salt".

The Slavic name of the Saale, Solawa, still found in Sorbian texts, comes from Old High German sol, "salt", and awa, "water".

== Course ==
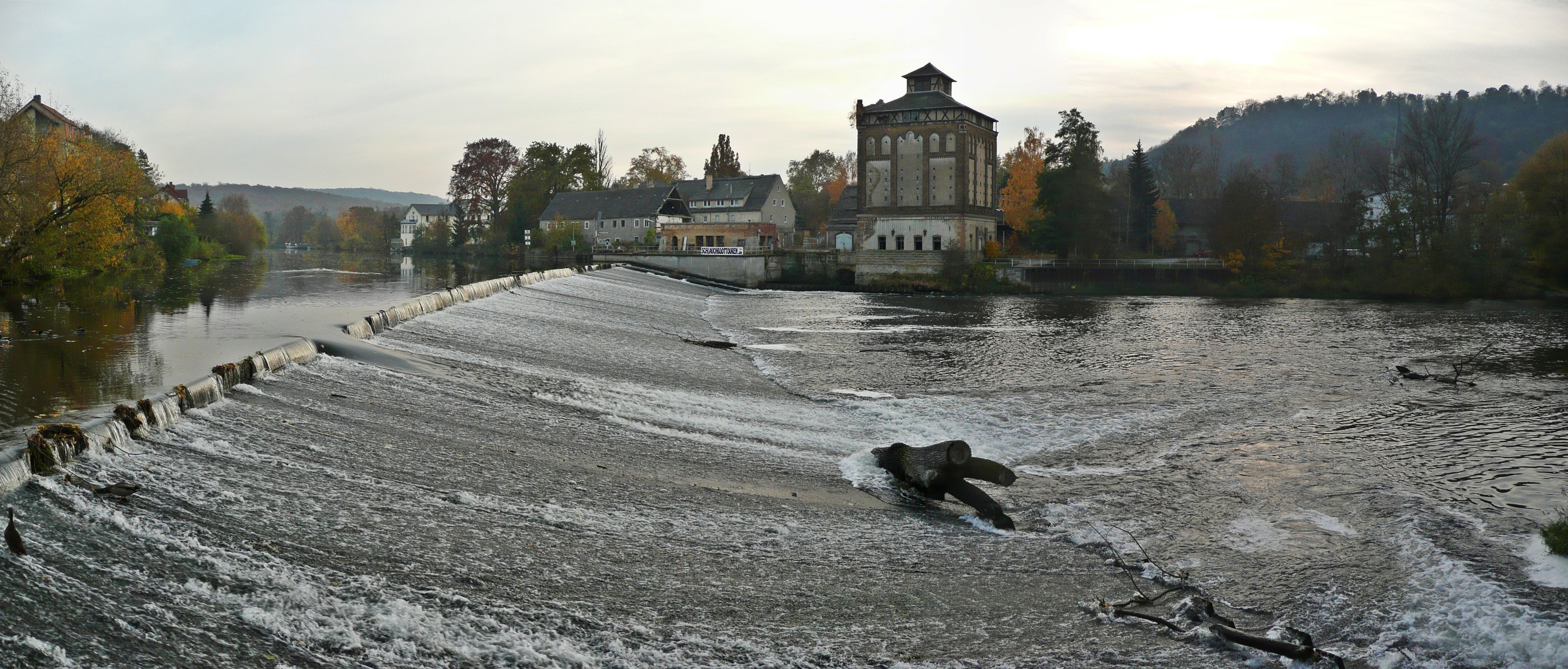
Saale in Bad Kösen

The Saale originates on the slope of the Großer Waldstein mountain near Zell in the Fichtel Mountains in Upper Franconia (Bavaria), at an elevation of 728 metres (2,388 ft). It pursues a winding course in a northern direction, and after passing the manufacturing town of Hof, enters Thuringia. It flows amid well-wooded low mountains of the Thuringian Forest until it reaches the valley of Saalfeld. After leaving Saalfeld the Saale reaches Rudolstadt. Here it receives the waters of the Schwarza, in whose valley lies the ruined castle of Schwarzburg, the ancestral seat of the formerly ruling House of Schwarzburg.

From Saalfeld, the Saale enters the limestone hill region north of the Thuringian Forest, and sweeps beneath the hills enclosing the university town of Jena. It enters Saxony-Anhalt and passes the spa of Bad Kösen and, after receiving the deep and navigable Unstrut at Naumburg, flows past Weißenfels, Merseburg, Halle, Bernburg and Calbe. It finally joins the Elbe just above Barby, after traversing a distance of 413 kilometres (257 mi)—shortened 14 kilometres (9 mi) by a bypass from its natural length of 427 kilometres (265 mi).

The Saale is navigable from Naumburg and is also planned connected from Leuna with the White Elster near Leipzig by an unfinished canal. The soil of the lower part of its valley is exceptionally fertile, and produces, amongst other crops, large quantities of sugar beet. Among its tributaries are the White Elster, Southern and Northern Regnitz and Orla on the right bank, and the Ilm, Unstrut, Salza, Wipper and Bode on the left. Its upper course is rapid. Its valley, down to Merseburg, contains many castles which crown the enclosing heights.

== Geography ==
Originating in Zell, the Saale flows through – Sparneck – Weißdorf – Seulbitz – Förbau – Schwarzenbach an der Saale – Fattigau – Oberkotzau – Hof – Brunnenthal – Saalenstein – Joditz – Landesgrenze Bayern/Thüringen – Hirschberg – Sparnberg – Rudolphstein – Blankenberg – Blankenstein – Harra – Saaldorf – Saalburg – Poeritzsch – Gräfenwarth – Burgk – Walsburg – Ziegenrück – Neidenberga – Hohenwarte – Eichicht – Kaulsdorf – Fischersdorf – Weischwitz – Reschwitz – Breternitz – Saalfeld – Schwarza – Volkstedt – Rudolstadt – Catharinau – Kolkwitz – Weißen – Uhlstädt – Rückersdorf – Zeutsch – Niederkrossen – Orlamünde – Freienorla – Großeutersdorf – Kleineutersdorf – Kahla – Großpürschütz – Jägersdorf – Rothenstein – Maua – Lobeda – Jena – Zwätzen – Porstendorf – Dornburg – Dorndorf-Steudnitz – Wichmar – Camburg – Tümpling – Großheringen – Kleinheringen – Landesgrenze Thüringen/Sachsen-Anhalt – Stendorf – Saaleck – Bad Kösen – Naumburg – Schellsitz - Schönburg – Eulau – Goseck – Leißling – Lobitzsch – Uichteritz – Markweben – Weißenfels – Dehlitz – Schkortleben – Kleinkorbetha – Großkorbetha – Oebles-Schlechtewitz – Wengelsdorf – Bad Dürrenberg – Kröllwitz – Leuna – Trebnitz – Merseburg – Meuschau – Freiimfelde – Schkopau – Korbetha – Hohenweiden – Rockendorf – Holleben – Halle – Kröllwitz – Lettin – Brachwitz – Schiepzig – Salzmünde – Pfützthal – Döblitz – Zaschwitz – Wettin – Kloschwitz – Rumpin – Dobis – Friedeburg – Zickeritz – Rothenburg – Nelben – Gnölbzig – Trebnitz – Alsleben – Poplitz – Großwirschleben – Plötzkau – Gröna – Neuborna – Bernburg – Dröbel – Nienburg – Wedlitz – Damaschkeplan – Wispitz – Calbe (Saale) – Trabitz – Groß Rosenburg – Werkleitz

== Tributaries ==
Left:

- Selbitz
- Schwarza
- Ilm
- Unstrut
- Salza
- Wipper
- Bode

Right:

- Orla
- White Elster
- Southern Regnitz
- Northern Regnitz

== See also ==
- Saale-Unstrut, a wine-growing region
- List of rivers of Bavaria
- List of rivers of Thuringia
- List of rivers of Saxony-Anhalt

== Sources ==
- Ernst-Otto Luthardt, Reinhard Feldrapp: An der Saale. Vom Fichtelgebirge durch Thüringen bis zur Elbe. Würzburg 1990. ISBN 3-8035-1335-9
- Wolf Thieme, Markus Altmann (Fotos): Mitten ins Herz. Sie entspringt in Bayern, durchquert Thüringen und fließt in Sachsen-Anhalt in die Elbe – die Saale ist ein Fluss, der alles verbindet. Und jedem Spaß macht: dem Sportler, dem Kulturfreund, dem Faulenzer. In: stern Nr. 26 (22. Juni 2006), S. 84-89. (Online-Version)
