= Zöllnitz =

- Municipality
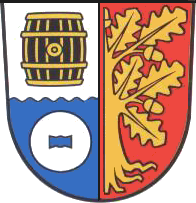
- Coat of arms

- Location of Zöllnitz within Saale-Holzland-Kreis district
- Interactive map of Zöllnitz
- Location within Germany Location within Thuringia
- Coordinates: 50°52′11″N 11°38′39″E
- Country: Germany
- State: Thuringia
- District: Saale-Holzland-Kreis
- Municipal assoc.: Südliches Saaletal

Government
  - Mayor (2022–28): Grit Sachse (CDU)

Area
  - Total: 4.2 km^{2} (1.6 sq mi)
- Elevation: 229 m (751 ft)

Population (2025-12-31)
  - Total: 1,273
  - Density: 300/km^{2} (790/sq mi)
- Time zone: UTC+01:00 (CET)
  - Summer (DST): UTC+02:00 (CEST)
- Postal codes: 07751
- Dialling codes: 03641
- Vehicle registration: SHK, EIS, SRO
- Website: www.zoellnitz.de

Zöllnitz is a municipality in the district of Saale-Holzland in Thuringia, Germany, and a part of the Southern Saale Valley Administrative Association.

== Geography ==
The independent city of Jena lies directly north of Zöllnitz. It is bordered by the municipality of Laasdorf in the east, Sulza to the west, and Großbockedra to the south. The river Roda flows through the village.

== History ==
The earliest record of the locality's existence dates back to the year 1343. In this document, the purchase of a vineyard near Beutnitz by the parish priest Heinrich von "Zilcnicz" is attested. The oldest records of landowners are from the period from 1421 to 1425.

== Economy ==
Zöllnitz hosts several small business parks in the northern and western parts of the municipality. In the west, for example, one can find a branch of the furniture chain Roller, while in the north, besides the FairHotel, there is also a car dealership as well as several small businesses.

Böttcher AG opened a new company location along Landesstraße 1077 in the year 2022.

== Traffic ==
Zöllnitz is connected to bus lines 820, 427, and 472, which stretch from Schleiz and Hermsdorf through Stadtroda to the center of Jena. On the northeastern border of the municipality lies the Neue Schenke station on the Weimar–Gera railway. It connects Zöllnitz to the regional railway from Gera via Jena all the way to Erfurt.

The A4 motorway stretches between Zöllnitz and Jena, which can be reached through the nearby Jena-Zentrum junction.

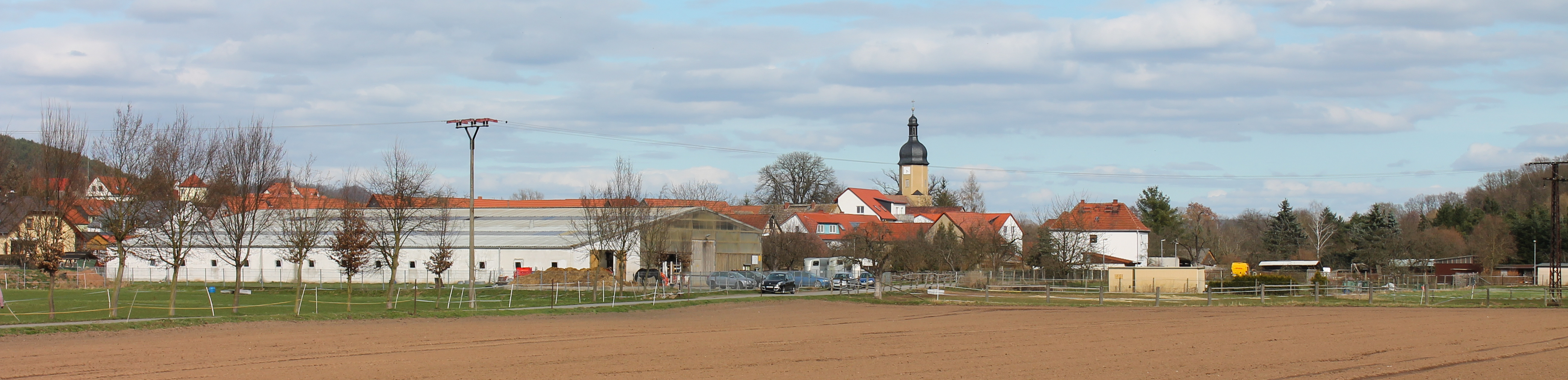
View of the location

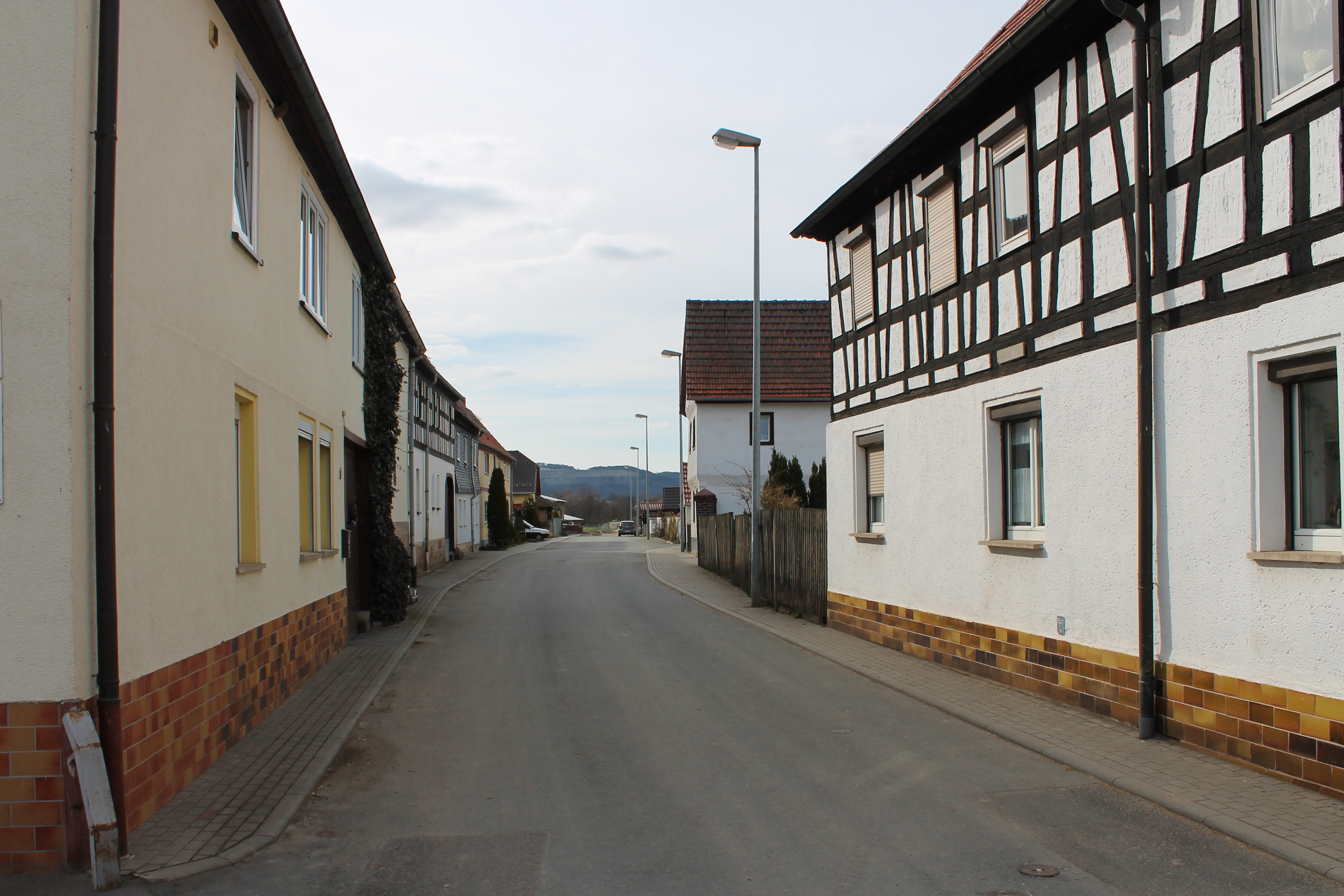
Streetview

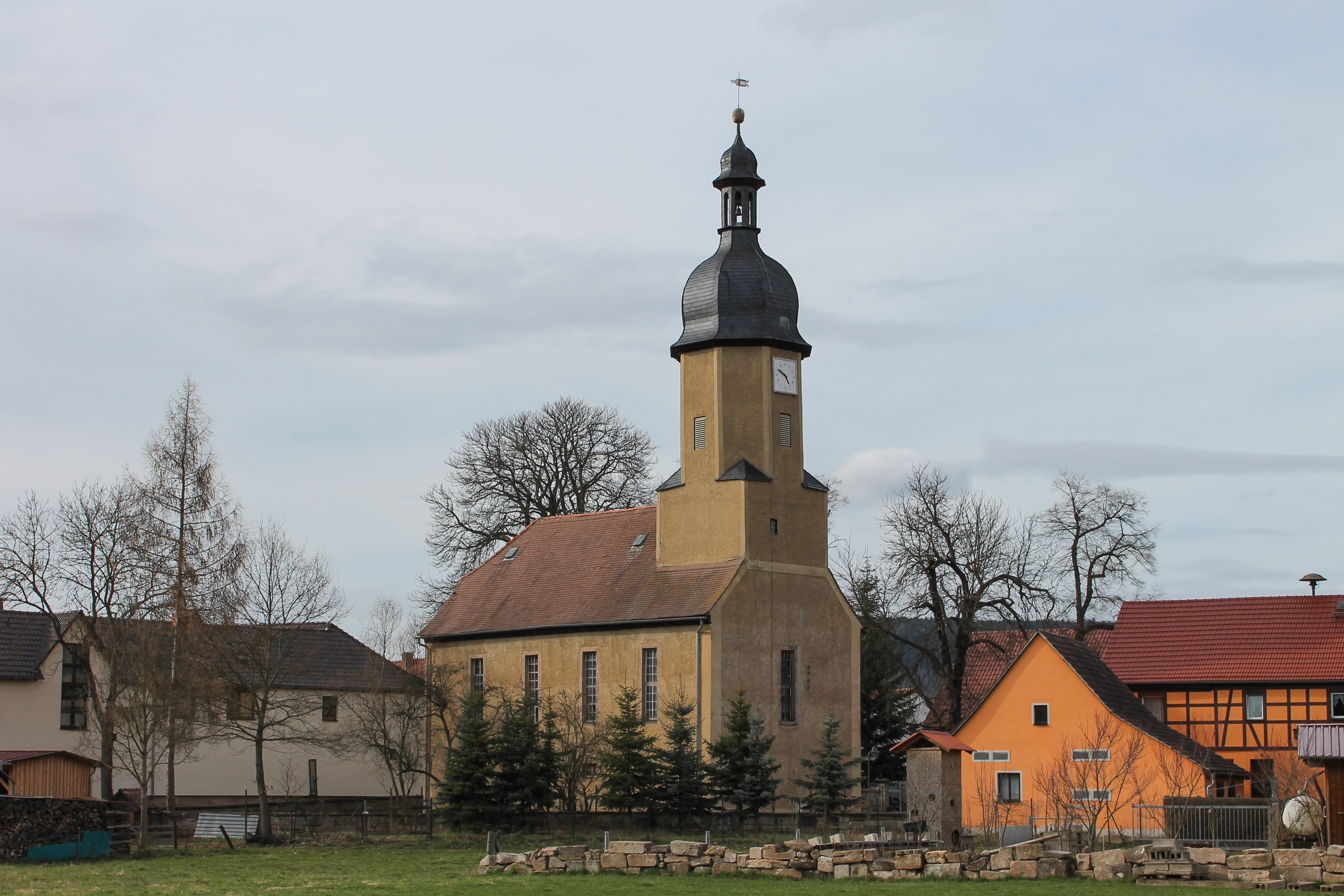
Church

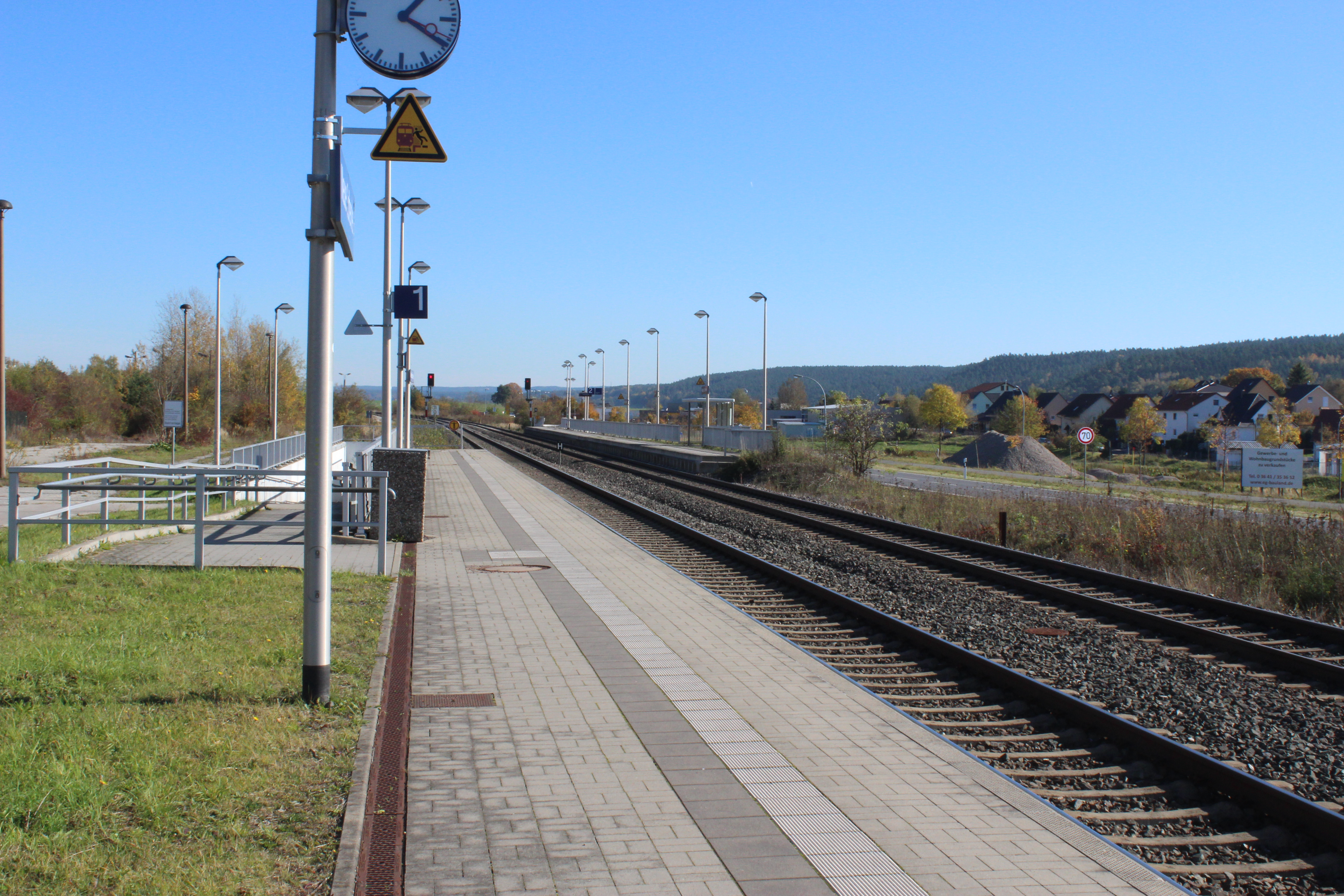
Neue Schenke station (2017)

== People ==
=== Born here ===
- Louis Schmeisser (1848–1917), weapons designer
- Gerhard Ost (1904–1988), local historian, stone cross researcher, and preservationist

== Holdings ==
The municipality is a shareholder of PD – Berater der öffentlichen Hand, a consulting firm exclusively for public sector clients.

== See also ==
- Zöllnitz Village Church
