= Laweke =

River in Germany

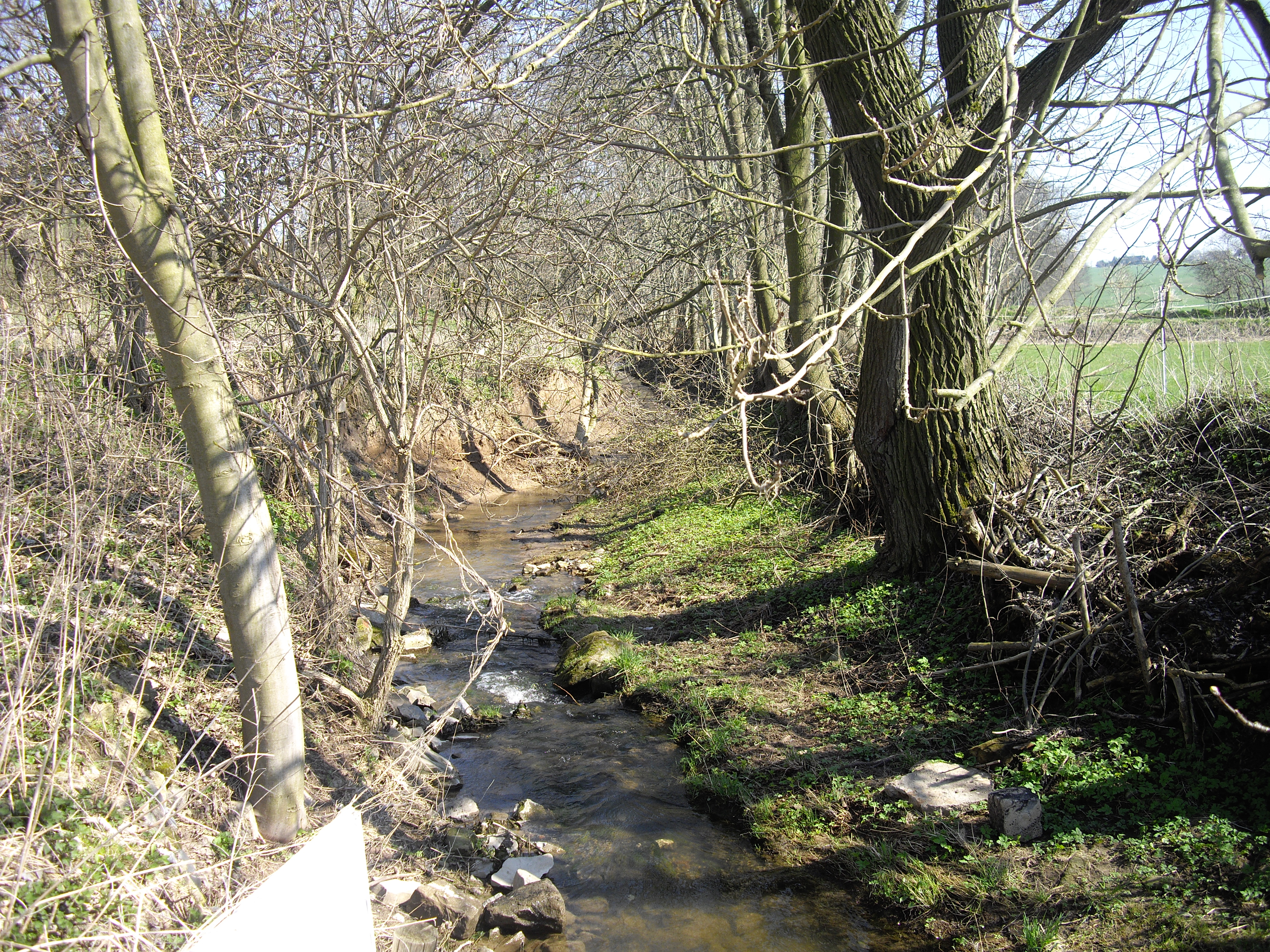
- The Laweke near Elbitz
- Etymology: Lawen-beke

Location
- Country: Germany
- States: Saxony-Anhalt

Physical characteristics
- Source
  - location: Hedersleben
  - coordinates: 51/30/27/N 11/48/30/E
  - elevation: 179 m
- Mouth: Salza
  - location: Zappendorf
  - coordinates: 51.5068°N 11.8084°E
  - elevation: 76 m
- Length: 145 km (90 mi)

Basin features
- Progression: Salza→ Saale→ Elbe→ North Sea

The Laweke is a small river in Saxony-Anhalt, Germany with a length of 14.5 km. It flows into the Salza in Zappendorf.

== Etymology ==
The name derives from the Middle Low German name *Lawen-beke, meaning "lauer Bach"(engl. lukewarm stream).

== Course ==
The Laweke starts in Hedersleben, northeast of Eisleben on the Mansfelder Platte a shallow mountain plateau at an elevation of 179 meters. Continuing east it flows through a small forest and Dederstedt. The valley deepens after that in the river tangents Elbitz in the north and then crosses the border to the Saalkreis, before reaching Schochwitz. The streams valley widens, as it turns south east after passing the village. The river then flows through Müllerdorf before joining the Salza (Saale) in Zappendorf.

== See also ==
- List of rivers of Saxony-Anhalt
