= Horst Lommer =

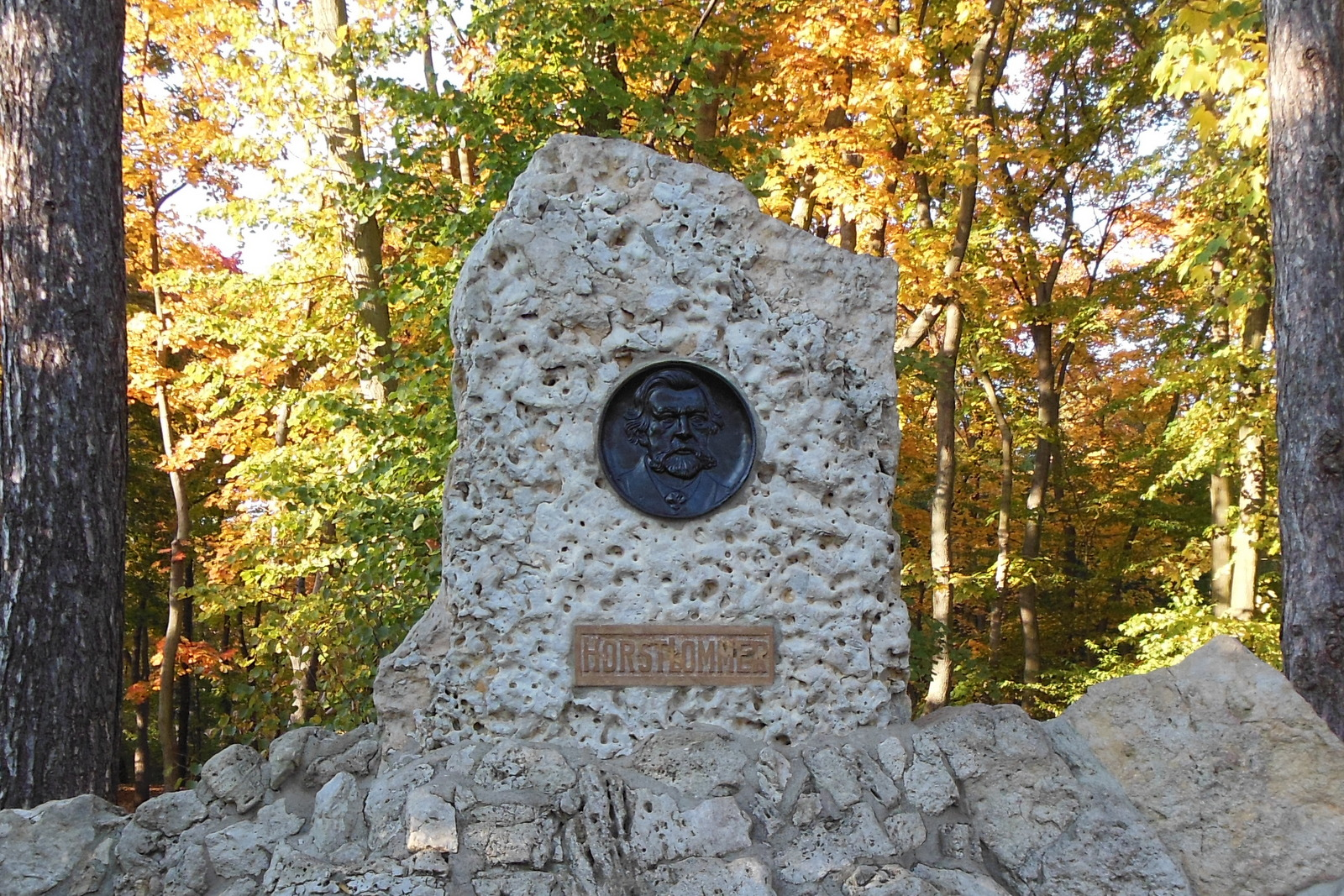
Memorial to Lommer at Landgrafen in Jena

Hermann Thuiskon Horst Lommer (20 August 1824 – 15 August 1905) was a German jurist and conservationist in Jena.

== Life ==
Horst Lommer was born in Wichmar, Saxe-Meiningen, as the son of a pastor. Following his Abitur, he studied legal science and took a position as assessor at the Higher Appellate Court (Oberappellationsgericht) in Jena. After some time there, he was in 1879 appointed as a prosecutor (Staatsanwalt) at the same court.

In the same year he was promoted to senior prosecutor (Oberstaatsanwalt) at the Thuringian Higher Regional Court. Upon the occasion of his 50th anniversary in 1896, he was appointed a privy councillor (Geheimer Oberjustizrat) and received honorary citizenship of the city of Jena. The University of Jena also awarded him an honorary doctorate. As a lover of nature and chairman of the local beautification society, Lommer was credited with the beautification of Jena's environment, which was the basis of his honorary citizenship. He died in Jena in 1905.

== Honours ==
A memorial stone to Lommer sits on a cliff overlooking the valley of Jena. Additionally, a walking/cycling path and street in Jena, the Lommerweg, is named in his honour.
