= Würde =

River in Germany

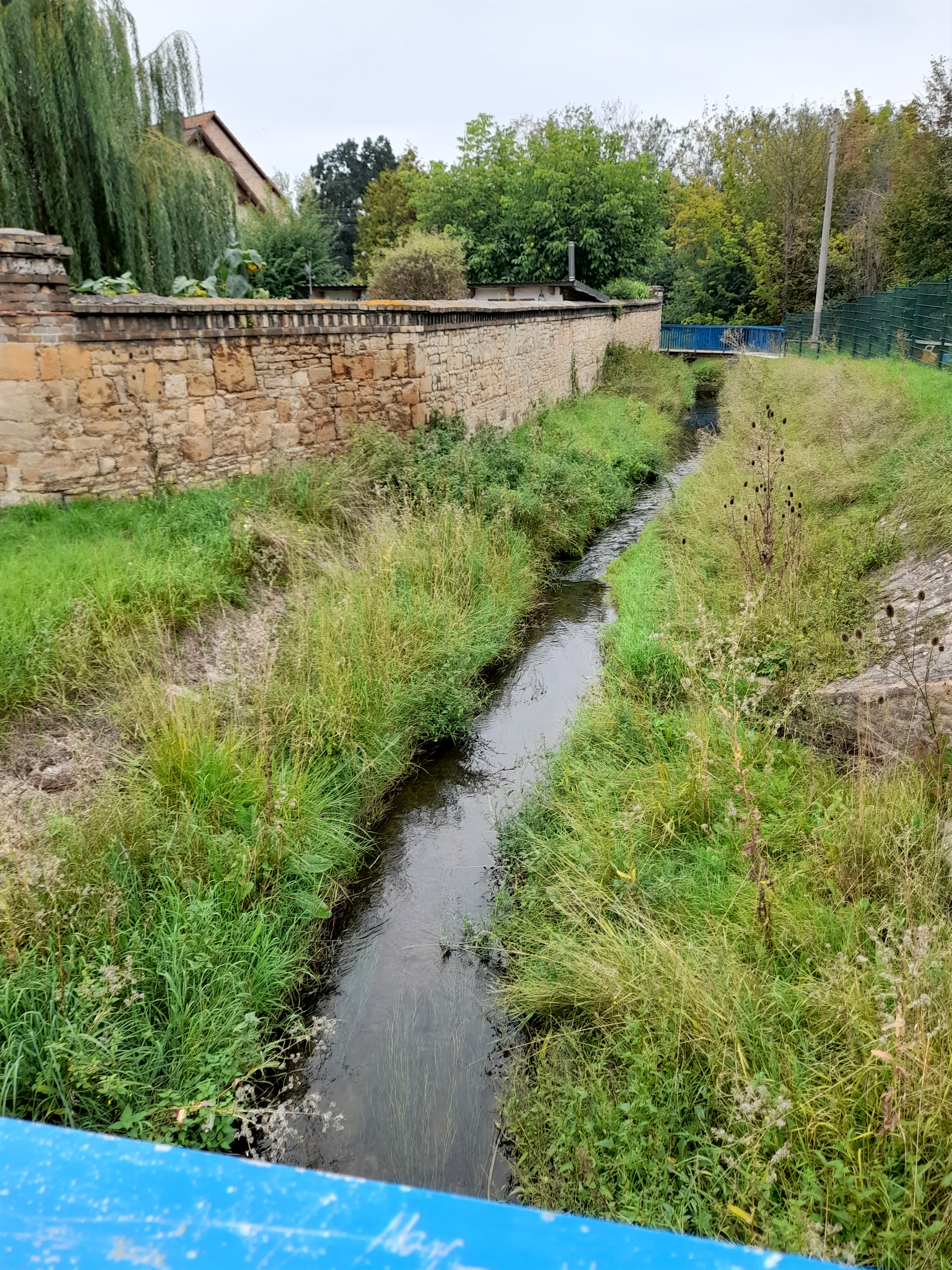

Location
- Country: Germany
- State: Saxony-Anhalt

Physical characteristics
- Mouth
  - location: Salza
  - coordinates: 51.4992°N 11.8108°E

Basin features
- Progression: Salza→ Saale→ Elbe→ North Sea

Würde is a river of Saxony-Anhalt, Germany. It flows into the Salza near Zappendorf.

== See also ==
- List of rivers of Saxony-Anhalt
