= Münchberg–Zell railway =

Overview
- Line number: 5026

Technical
- Line length: 14.7 km (9.1 mi)
- Track gauge: 1,435 mm (4 ft 8 1/2 in)

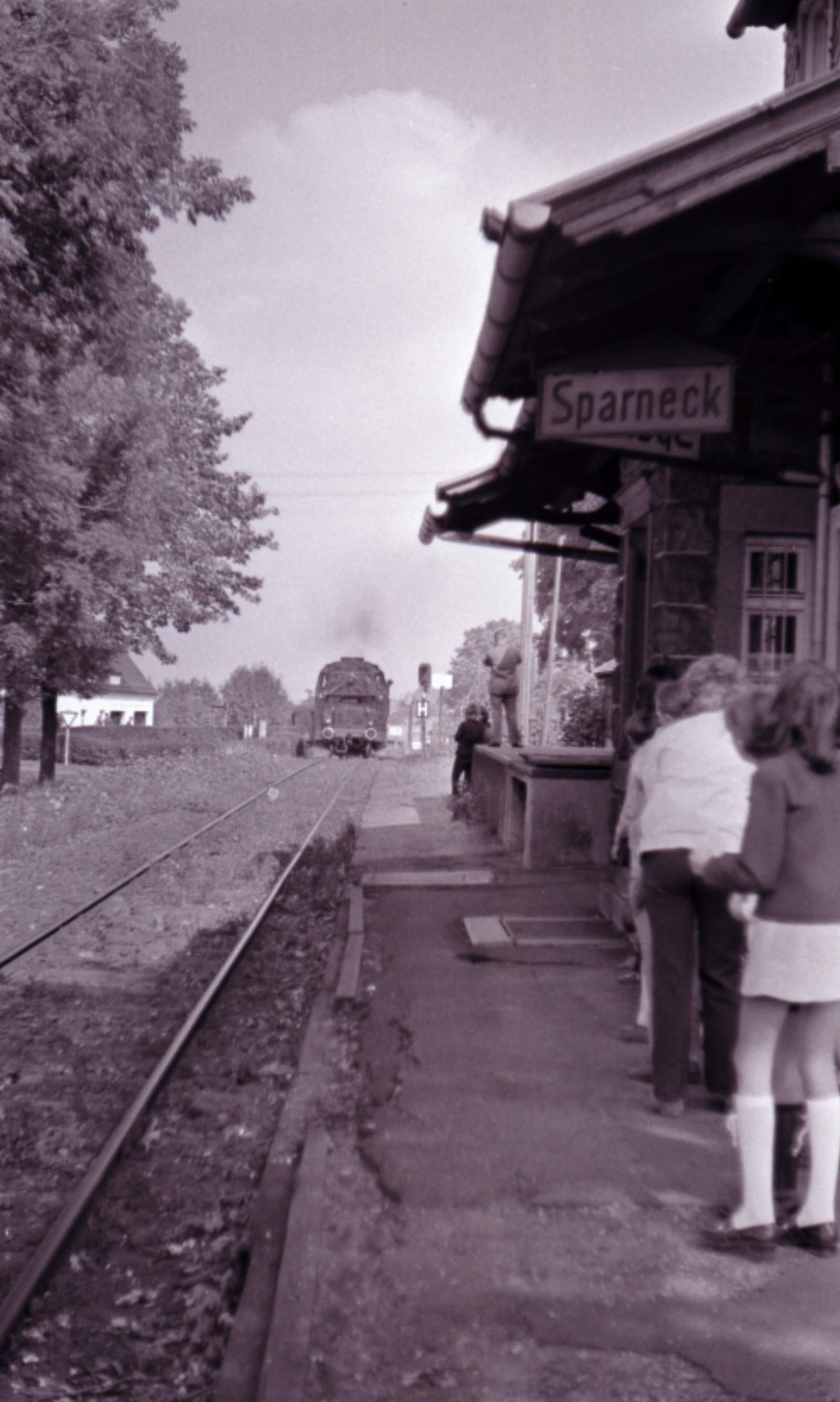
Train at Sparneck's old station

The Münchberg–Zell railway was a south German branch line in Bavaria. It linked the former county town of Münchberg in the Bavarian province of Upper Franconia with the market town of Zell im Fichtelgebirge. This standard gauge, single tracked Lokalbahn ('local line') was 10 km long and was opened on 17 October 1902 by the Royal Bavarian State Railways.

The line started at Münchberg station, which was on Ludwig's South-North Railway between Hof and Neuenmarkt-Wirsberg, and ran at first in a southeasterly direction to the market community of Sparneck. It then turned southwest and finally reached its terminus, the climatic health resort of Zell at 631 m above sea level on the northern edge of the Waldsteingebirge mountains. The line climbed a height of almost one hundred metres as it made its way from Münchberg to Zell.

On workdays there were usually four to six pairs of trains; on Sundays even as many as seven. With the improvement in economic circumstances after the Second World War passengers increasingly turned to buses and private cars. Nevertheless, due to thriving tourist traffic, the line survived for a long time until both passenger and goods services were withdrawn on 25 September 1971.

== See also ==
- Royal Bavarian State Railways
- Bavarian branch lines
- List of closed railway lines in Bavaria

== Sources ==
- MEC 01 Münchberger Eisenbahnfreunde e.V.: 100 Jahre Lokalbahn Münchberg - Zell "WALDSTEINEXPRESS" Münchberg 2002 (Author: Roland Fraas 72 pages) (see link below)
- Wolfgang Bleiweis, Ekkehard Martin, Stefan Winkler: Fränkische Nebenbahnen einst und jetzt – Oberfranken. Egglham und München 1986
