= Camburg =

- Quarter of Dornburg-Camburg
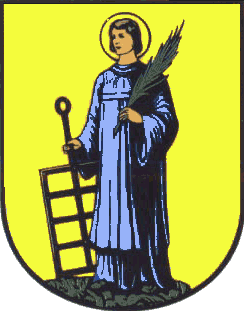
- Coat of arms
- Interactive map of Camburg
- Location within Germany Location within Thuringia
- Coordinates: 51°3′14″N 11°42′27″E
- Country: Germany
- State: Thuringia
- District: Saale-Holzland-Kreis
- Municipal assoc.: Dornburg-Camburg
- Town: Dornburg-Camburg
- Subdivisions: 9

Area
  - Total: 13.31 km^{2} (5.14 sq mi)
- Elevation: 130 m (430 ft)

Population (2006-12-31)
  - Total: 2,899
  - Density: 217.8/km^{2} (564.1/sq mi)
- Time zone: UTC+01:00 (CET)
  - Summer (DST): UTC+02:00 (CEST)
- Postal codes: 07774
- Dialling codes: 036421
- Vehicle registration: SHK
- Website: www.stadt-camburg.de

Camburg (German pronunciation: [ˈkambʊʁk]) is a town in the Saale-Holzland district, in Thuringia, Germany. It is situated on the river Saale, 18 km northeast of Jena, and 13 km southwest of Naumburg. Since 1 December 2008, it is part of the town Dornburg-Camburg.

The first mention of Camburg dates from 1088, and during the Middle Ages the Burg was a residence of the Wettiner family. Camburg castle controls a crossing of the Saale which was an important trade route for salt being carried from Bad Sulza towards the south east.

The valley of the Saale cuts through Muschelkalk cliffs, in which a hermit's cave, the Klausloch, can still be seen to the north east of the town. Across the river, the ruins of St Cyriak's church date from around AD 1000.

Camburg's Museum in Amtshof 1–2 has exhibits from pre-historic to recent times, including a working example of a Spieluhr.
