= Lindig =

- Municipality
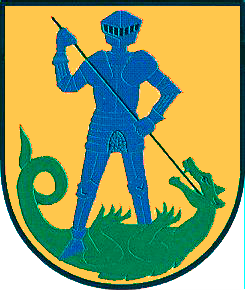
- Coat of arms

- Location of Lindig within Saale-Holzland-Kreis district
- Interactive map of Lindig
- Location within Germany Location within Thuringia
- Coordinates: 50°47′N 11°36′E
- Country: Germany
- State: Thuringia
- District: Saale-Holzland-Kreis
- Municipal assoc.: Südliches Saaletal

Government
  - Mayor (2021–27): Jördis Müller

Area
  - Total: 4.56 km^{2} (1.76 sq mi)
- Elevation: 260 m (850 ft)

Population (2025-12-31)
  - Total: 235
  - Density: 51.5/km^{2} (133/sq mi)
- Time zone: UTC+01:00 (CET)
  - Summer (DST): UTC+02:00 (CEST)
- Postal codes: 07768
- Dialling codes: 036424
- Vehicle registration: SHK, EIS, SRO
- Website: www.vg-suedliches-saaletal.de

Lindig is a municipality in the district Saale-Holzland, in Thuringia, Germany.
