= Dorndorf-Steudnitz =

- Quarter of Dornburg-Camburg
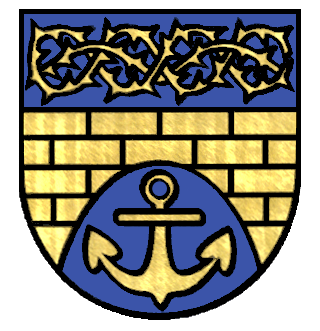
- Coat of arms
- Interactive map of Dorndorf-Steudnitz
- Location within Germany Location within Thuringia
- Coordinates: 51°0′N 11°40′E
- Country: Germany
- State: Thuringia
- District: Saale-Holzland-Kreis
- Municipal assoc.: Dornburg-Camburg
- Town: Dornburg-Camburg

Area
  - Total: 7.01 km^{2} (2.71 sq mi)
- Elevation: 135 m (443 ft)

Population (2006-12-31)
  - Total: 1,930
  - Density: 275/km^{2} (713/sq mi)
- Time zone: UTC+01:00 (CET)
  - Summer (DST): UTC+02:00 (CEST)
- Postal codes: 07778
- Dialling codes: 036427
- Website: dorndorf-steudnitz.de

Dorndorf-Steudnitz (German pronunciation: [ˈdɔʁndɔʁf ˈʃtɔʏdnɪts]) is a former municipality in the district Saale-Holzland, in Thuringia, Germany. Since 1 December 2008, it is part of the town Dornburg-Camburg.

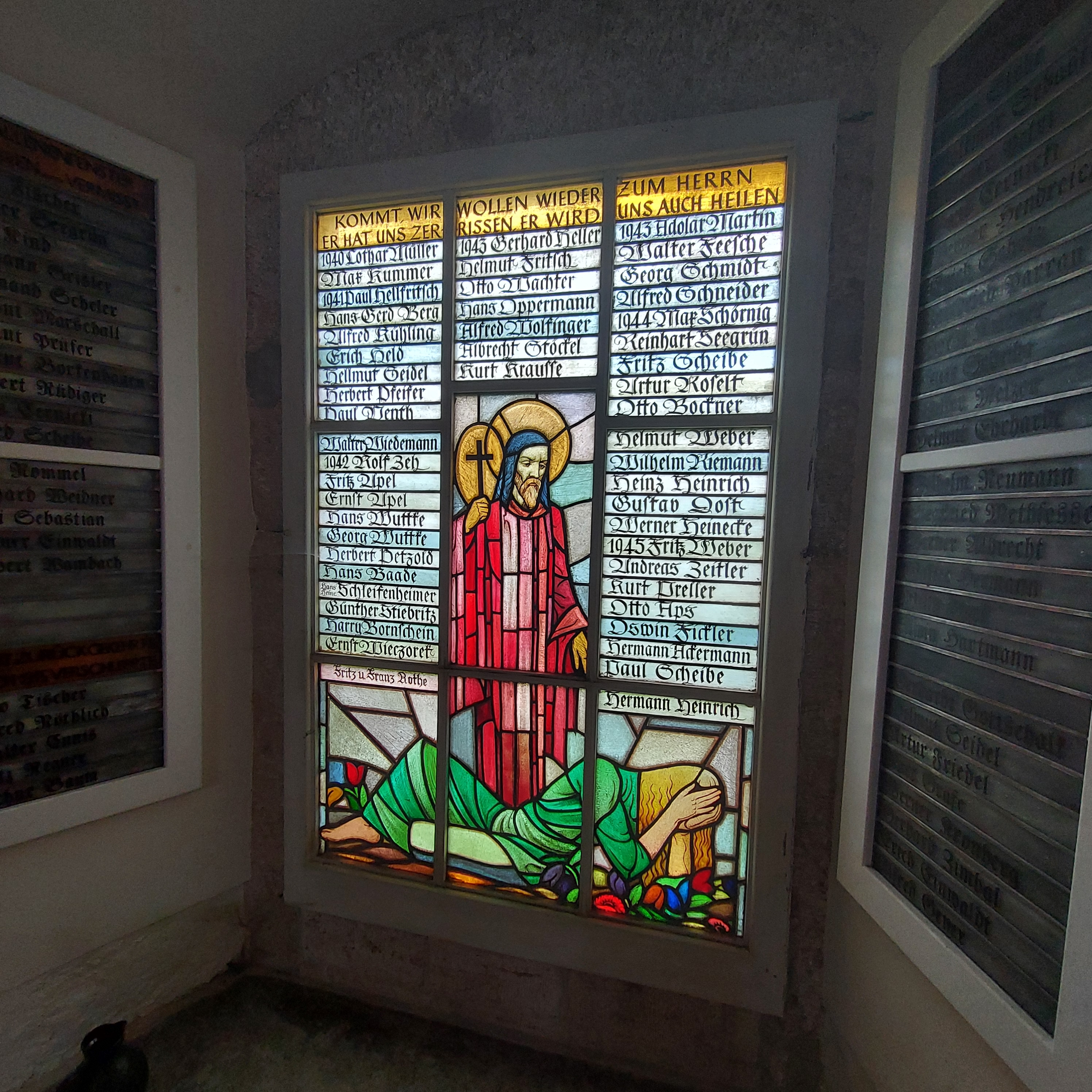
War memorial in Leadlight

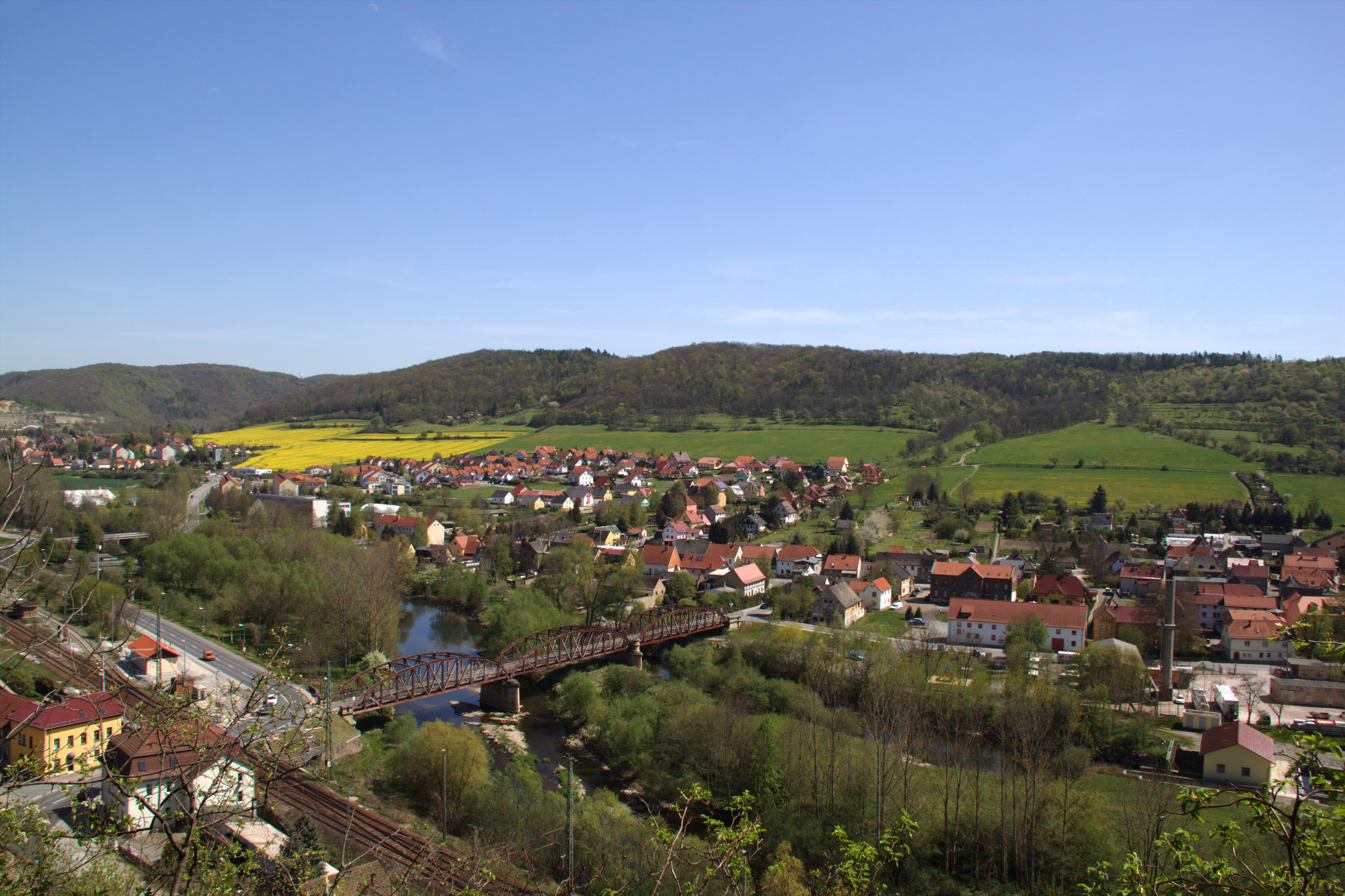
view from Altes Schloss, with the Carl Alexander bridge.

Its most important historical building is St. Peters Church, which connects baroque architecture with later additions such as a World War memorial, and the Carl Alexander bridge from 1892 spanning the river Saale.
