= Southern Regnitz =

River in Germany

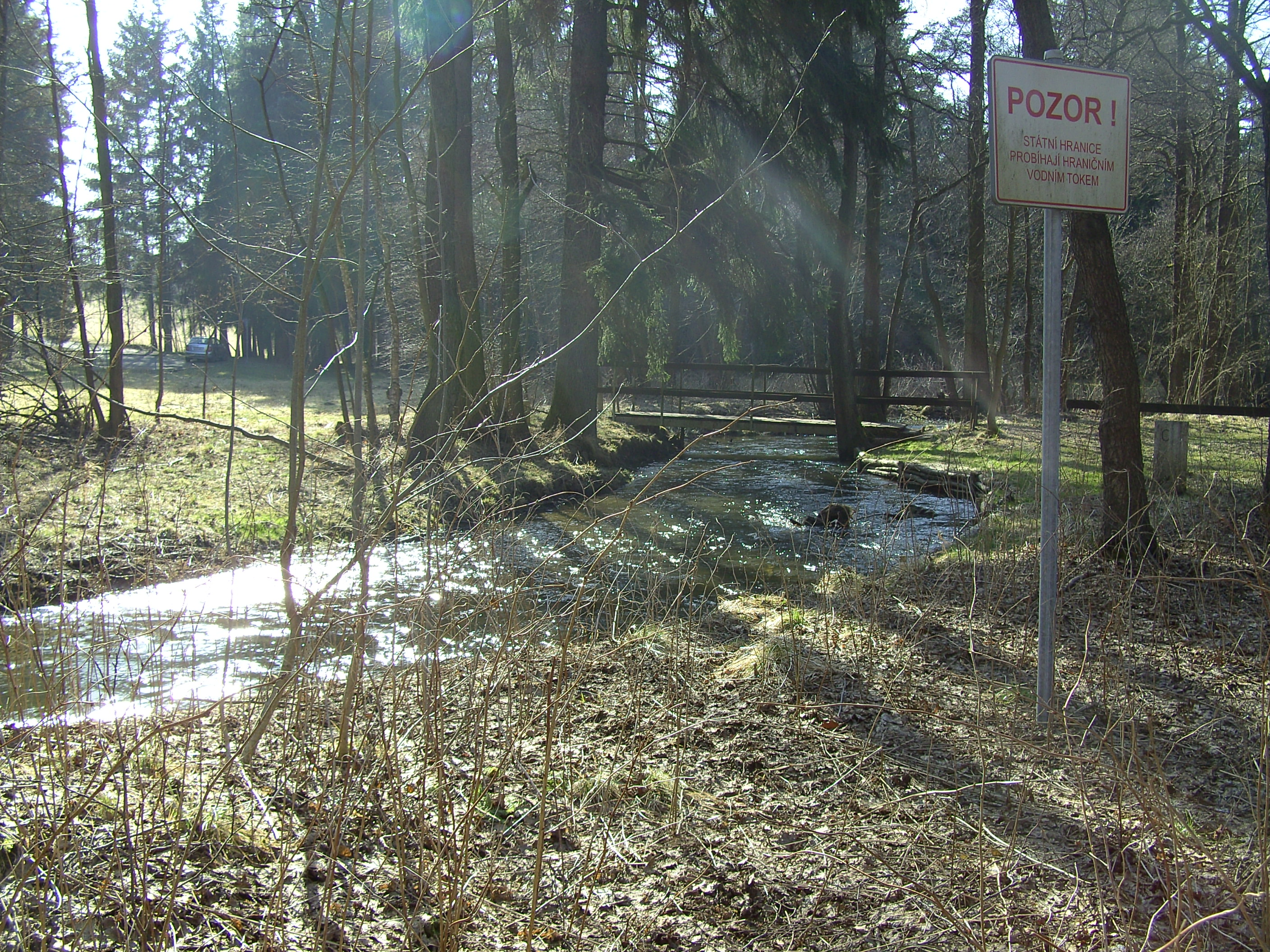
- The Southern Regnits at the tri-state area (Bavaria, Saxony, Czech Republic)
- Native name: Südliche Regnitz (German); Rokytnice (Czech)

Location
- Countries: Germany; Czech Republic
- State (DE): Bavaria
- Region (CZ): Karlovy Vary

Physical characteristics
- Mouth
  - location: Saale
  - coordinates: 50.2964°N 11.9347°E
- Length: 33.8 km (21.0 mi)
- Basin size: 115 km^{2} (44 sq mi)

Basin features
- Progression: Saale→ Elbe→ North Sea

The Southern Regnitz (German: Südliche Regnitz, Czech: Rokytnice) is a river of Czech Republic and Germany. The source of the 33.8 km long river is near the village of Hranice, in Cheb District. It forms the border of Germany with the Czech Republic in the extreme northeast of Bavaria and then runs into Bavaria to join the Saale river near the city of Hof.

== See also ==
- List of rivers of Bavaria
