= Salza (Saale) =

River in Germany

Salza Querne, Weida
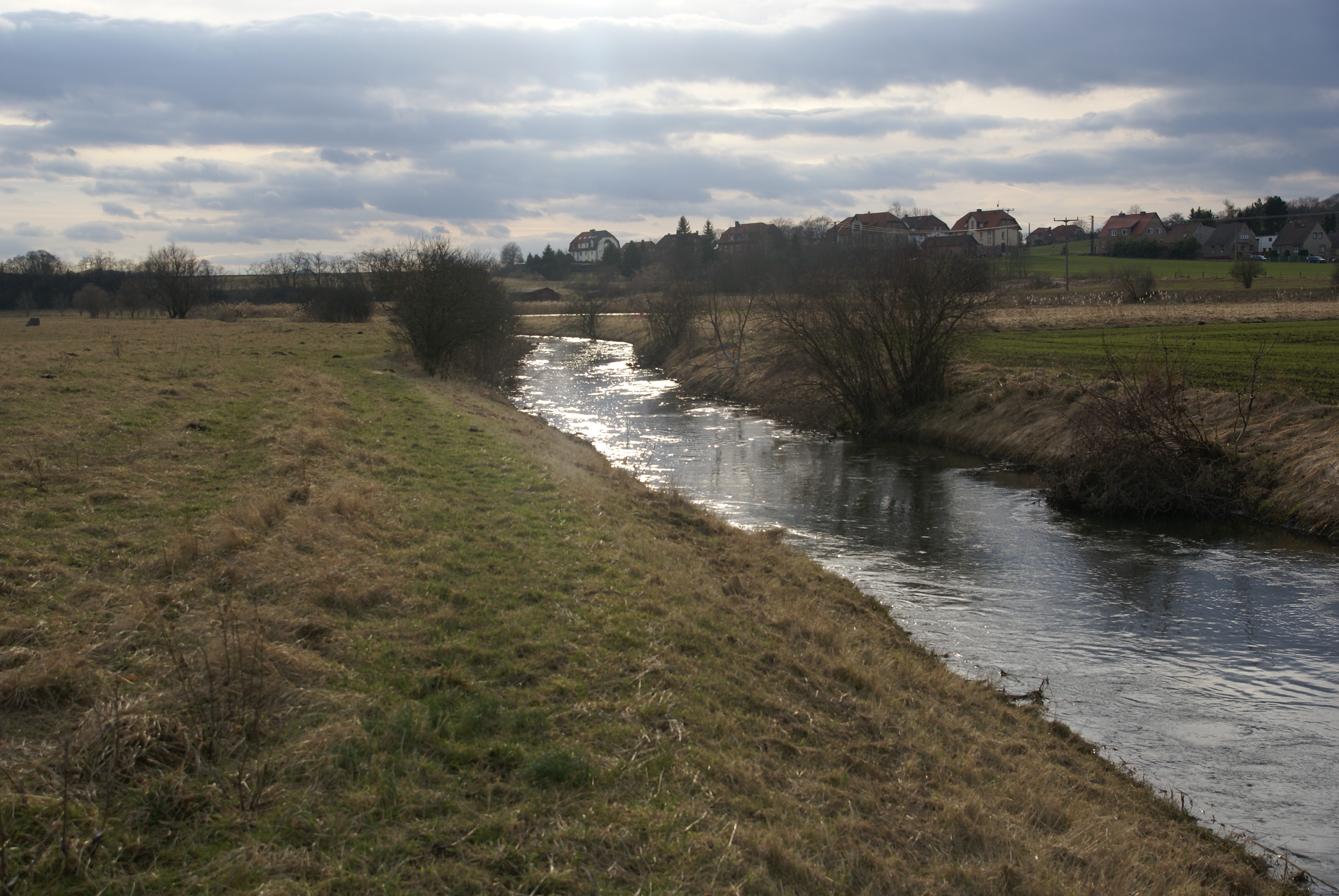

Location
- Country: Germany
- State: Saxony-Anhalt

Physical characteristics
- Mouth: Saale
  - coordinates: 51°31′46″N 11°49′59″E
- Length: 10.8 km (6.7 mi)(48.2 km (30.0 mi))

Basin features
- Progression: Saale→ Elbe→ North Sea
- Tributaries
  - left: Laweke
  - right: Weidenbach, Würde

The Salza is a river of Saxony-Anhalt state, in Germany. It is a left tributary of the Saale in Salzmünde.

The upper section of the Salza carries the name Querne. Its source is near the village Landgrafroda, a district of the town Querfurt. It flows through Querfurt to Obhausen, where it receives its right tributary Weidenbach. Downstream from this confluence, the river carries the name Weida. It continues through Schraplau and Röblingen am See and near Langenbogen it receives water that is pumped out of the lake Kernersee (fed by the river Böse Sieben). From this point it carries the name Salza. The Salza proper is 10.8 km (6.7 mi) long; including Querne and Weida, it is 48.2 km (30.0 mi) long.

== See also ==
- List of rivers of Saxony-Anhalt
