= Northern Regnitz =

River in Germany

Northern Regnitz Nördliche Regnitz
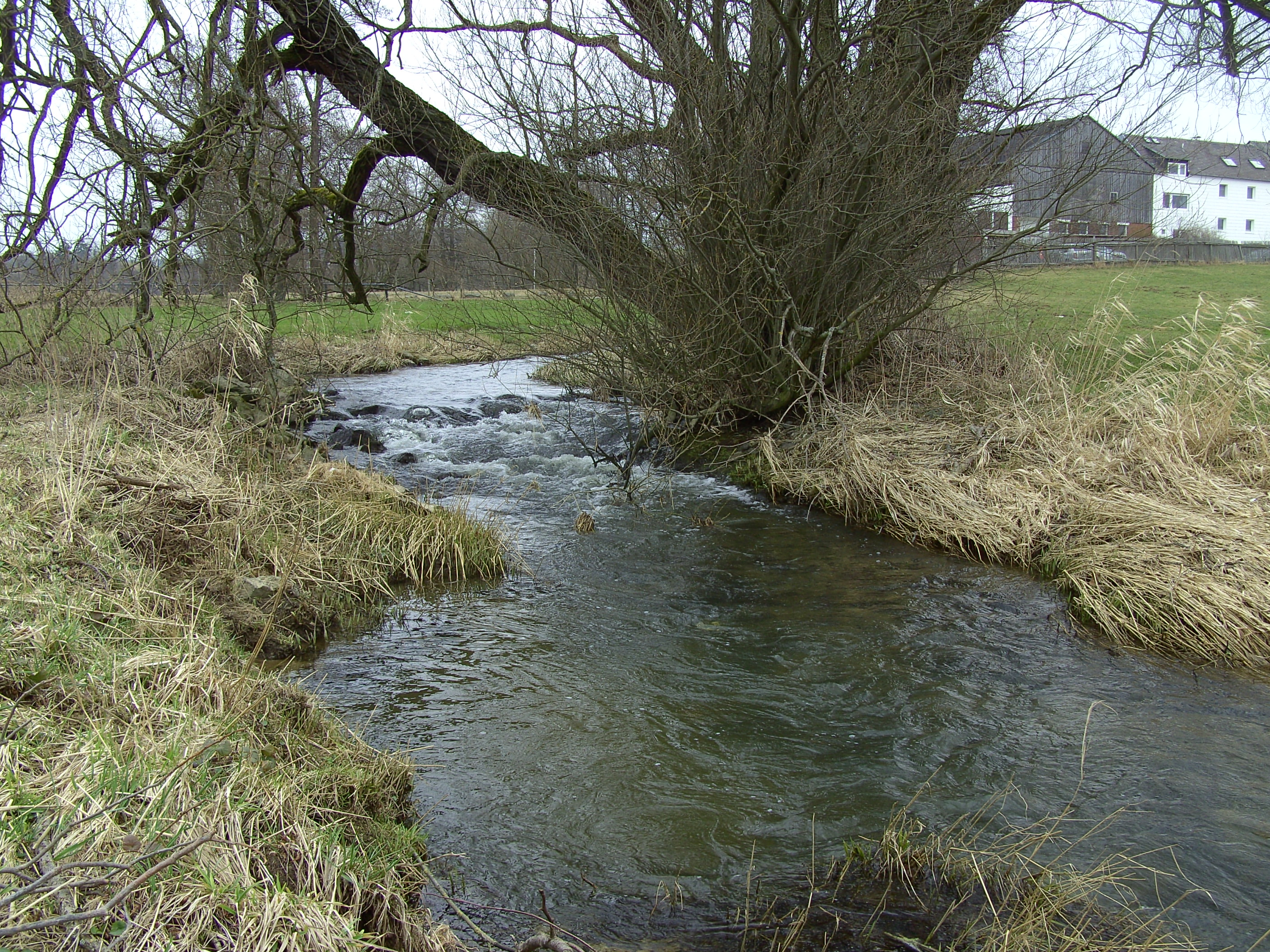
- The Northern Regnitz shortly before its mouth

Location
- Country: Germany
- State: Bavaria

Physical characteristics
- Mouth
  - location: Saale
  - coordinates: 50.3400°N 11.8939°E
- Length: 7.7 km (4.8 mi)

Basin features
- Progression: Saale→ Elbe→ North Sea

The Northern Regnitz (German: Nördliche Regnitz) is a river in Bavaria, Germany. The 7.7-kilometre-long (4.8 mi) river flows into the Saale northwest of Hof.

== See also ==
- List of rivers of Bavaria
