= Dornburg =

Town in Thuringia, Germany

- Quarter of Dornburg-Camburg
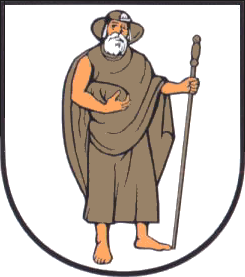
- Coat of arms
- Interactive map of Dornburg
- Location within Germany Location within Thuringia
- Coordinates: 51°0′23″N 11°39′58″E
- Country: Germany
- State: Thuringia
- District: Saale-Holzland-Kreis
- Municipal assoc.: Dornburg-Camburg
- Town: Dornburg-Camburg

Area
  - Total: 10.40 km^{2} (4.02 sq mi)
- Elevation: 235 m (771 ft)

Population (2006-12-31)
  - Total: 909
  - Density: 87.4/km^{2} (226/sq mi)
- Time zone: UTC+01:00 (CET)
  - Summer (DST): UTC+02:00 (CEST)
- Postal codes: 07778
- Dialling codes: 036427
- Vehicle registration: SHK
- Website: www.dornburg-saale.de

Dornburg (German pronunciation: [ˈdɔʁnbʊʁk]) is a town in the Saale-Holzland district, in Thuringia, Germany. It sits atop a small hill of 400 ft above the Saale. Since 1 December 2008, it is part of the town Dornburg-Camburg.

== History ==
Within the German Empire (1871–1918), Dornburg was part of the Grand Duchy of Saxe-Weimar-Eisenach.

== Main sights ==
Dornburg is mainly known for its three grand ducal castles, once belonging to the former grand-dukes of Saxe-Weimar-Eisenach. These are:

- Altes Schloss, which is built on the site of older castles from the early 12th century. One such castle was the Kaiserpfalz, often a residence of the emperors Otto II and Otto III, and where the emperor Henry II held a diet in 1005.
- Neues Schloss or "Rokokoschloss", built in the Italian style in the years 1728–1748. It features pretty gardens that drew the likes of Goethe.
- The third and southernmost of the three is the so-called Renaissanceschloss, which was built in the 17th century on the site of an older castle.

== Transport ==
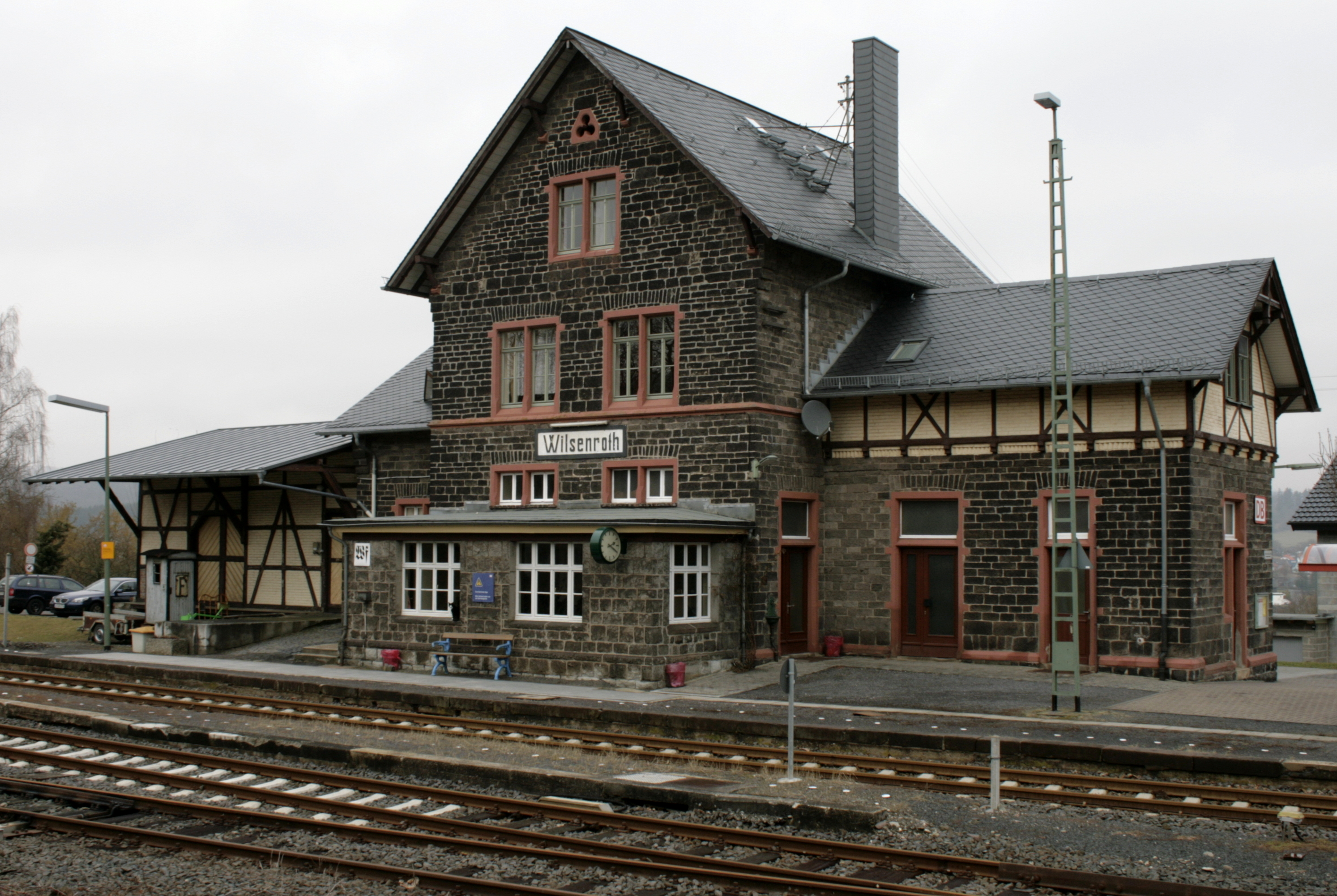
Wilsenroth station

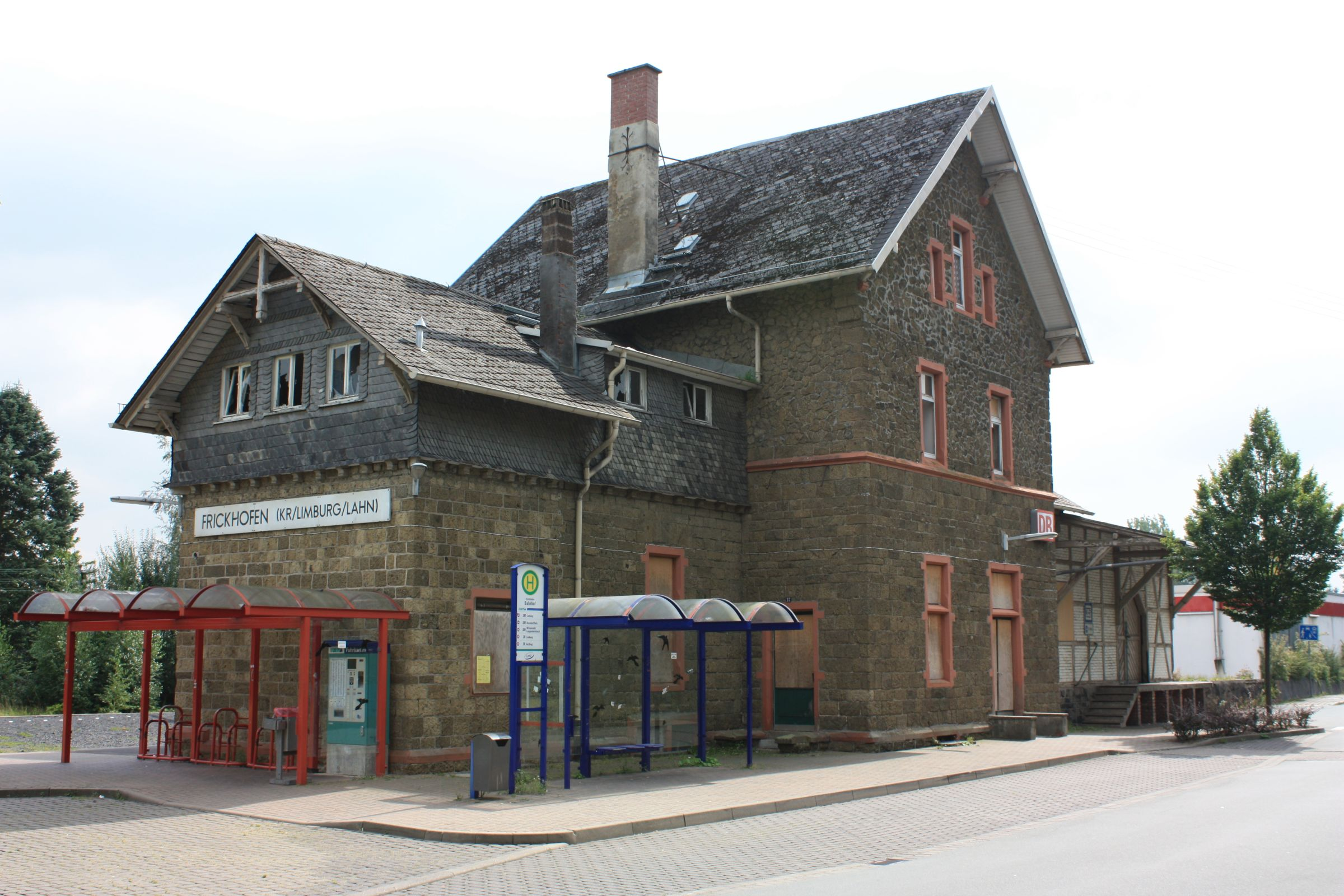
Frickhofen station

The train stations Wilsenroth and Frickhofen of Upper Westerwald railway are located in Dornburg.
