= Reinstädt =

- Municipality
- Coat of arms

- Location of Reinstädt within Saale-Holzland-Kreis district
- Interactive map of Reinstädt
- Location within Germany Location within Thuringia
- Coordinates: 50°48′32″N 11°28′27″E
- Country: Germany
- State: Thuringia
- District: Saale-Holzland-Kreis
- Municipal assoc.: Südliches Saaletal

Government
  - Mayor (2022–28): Volkmar Manß

Area
  - Total: 17.94 km^{2} (6.93 sq mi)
- Elevation: 250 m (820 ft)

Population (2025-12-31)
  - Total: 453
  - Density: 25.3/km^{2} (65.4/sq mi)
- Time zone: UTC+01:00 (CET)
  - Summer (DST): UTC+02:00 (CEST)
- Postal codes: 07768
- Dialling codes: 036422
- Vehicle registration: SHK, EIS, SRO
- Website: www.vg-suedliches-saaletal.de

Reinstädt is a municipality in the district Saale-Holzland, in Thuringia, Germany.
