= Eichenberg, Saale-Holzland =

Eichenberg
- Municipality
- Coat of arms

- Location of Eichenberg within Saale-Holzland-Kreis district
- Interactive map of Eichenberg
- Location within Germany Location within Thuringia
- Coordinates: 50°47′38″N 11°31′47″E
- Country: Germany
- State: Thuringia
- District: Saale-Holzland-Kreis
- Municipal assoc.: Südliches Saaletal

Government
  - Mayor (2022–28): Sebastian Schneider (CDU)

Area
  - Total: 11.54 km^{2} (4.46 sq mi)
- Elevation: 250 m (820 ft)

Population (2025-12-31)
  - Total: 361
  - Density: 31.3/km^{2} (81.0/sq mi)
- Time zone: UTC+01:00 (CET)
  - Summer (DST): UTC+02:00 (CEST)
- Postal codes: 07768
- Dialling codes: 036424
- Vehicle registration: SHK, EIS, SRO
- Website: www.eichenberg-shk.de

Eichenberg (German pronunciation: [ˈaɪçn̩bɛʁk]) is a municipality in the district Saale-Holzland, in Thuringia, Germany.
