= Dornburg-Camburg =

- Town
- Location of Dornburg-Camburg within Saale-Holzland-Kreis district
- Interactive map of Dornburg-Camburg
- Location within Germany Location within Thuringia
- Coordinates: 51°3′14″N 11°42′27″E
- Country: Germany
- State: Thuringia
- District: Saale-Holzland-Kreis
- Municipal assoc.: Dornburg-Camburg

Government
  - Mayor (2024–30): Jens Tischendorf

Area
  - Total: 30.77 km^{2} (11.88 sq mi)
- Elevation: 130 m (430 ft)

Population (2025-12-31)
  - Total: 5,289
  - Density: 171.9/km^{2} (445.2/sq mi)
- Time zone: UTC+01:00 (CET)
  - Summer (DST): UTC+02:00 (CEST)
- Postal codes: 07774, 07778 (Dornburg)
- Dialling codes: 036421
- Vehicle registration: SHK, EIS, SRO
- Website: dornburg-camburg.de

Dornburg-Camburg (German pronunciation: [ˈdɔʁnbʊʁk ˈkambʊʁk]) is a town in the Saale-Holzland district, in Thuringia, Germany. It was created on 1 December 2008, when the towns Dornburg and Camburg and the municipality Dorndorf-Steudnitz were merged.

== History ==
Within the German Empire (1871-1918), Dornburg and Dorndorf-Steudnitz were part of the Grand Duchy of Saxe-Weimar-Eisenach, while Camburg was part of the Duchy of Saxe-Meiningen.

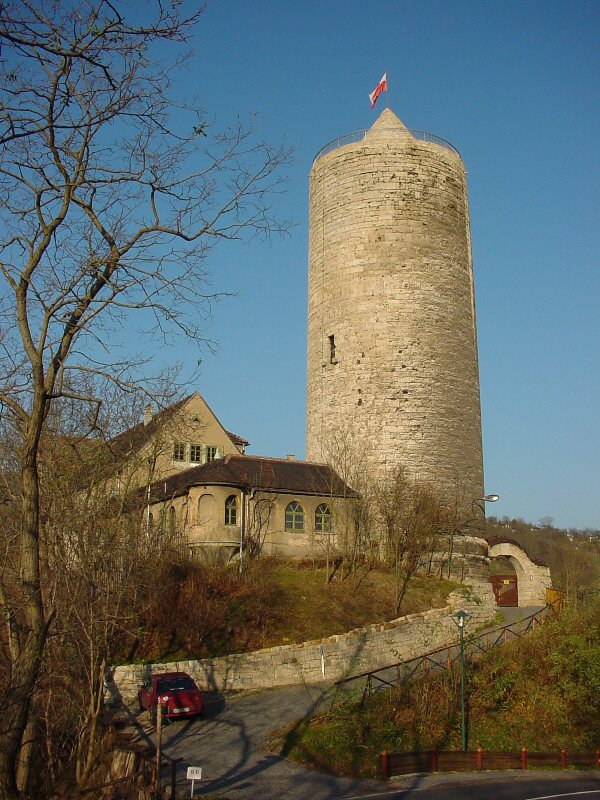
Camburg castle (2004)
