= Altenberga =

- Municipality
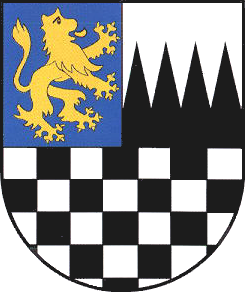
- Coat of arms

- Location of Altenberga within Saale-Holzland-Kreis district
- Interactive map of Altenberga
- Location within Germany Location within Thuringia
- Coordinates: 50°50′N 11°32′E
- Country: Germany
- State: Thuringia
- District: Saale-Holzland-Kreis
- Municipal assoc.: Südliches Saaletal

Government
  - Mayor (2022–28): Michael Schmidt

Area
  - Total: 17.49 km^{2} (6.75 sq mi)
- Elevation: 250 m (820 ft)

Population (2025-12-31)
  - Total: 791
  - Density: 45.2/km^{2} (117/sq mi)
- Time zone: UTC+01:00 (CET)
  - Summer (DST): UTC+02:00 (CEST)
- Postal codes: 07768
- Dialling codes: 036424
- Vehicle registration: SHK, EIS, SRO
- Website: www.vg-suedliches-saaletal.de

Altenberga is a municipality in the district Saale-Holzland, in Thuringia, Germany.
