= Seitenroda =

- Municipality
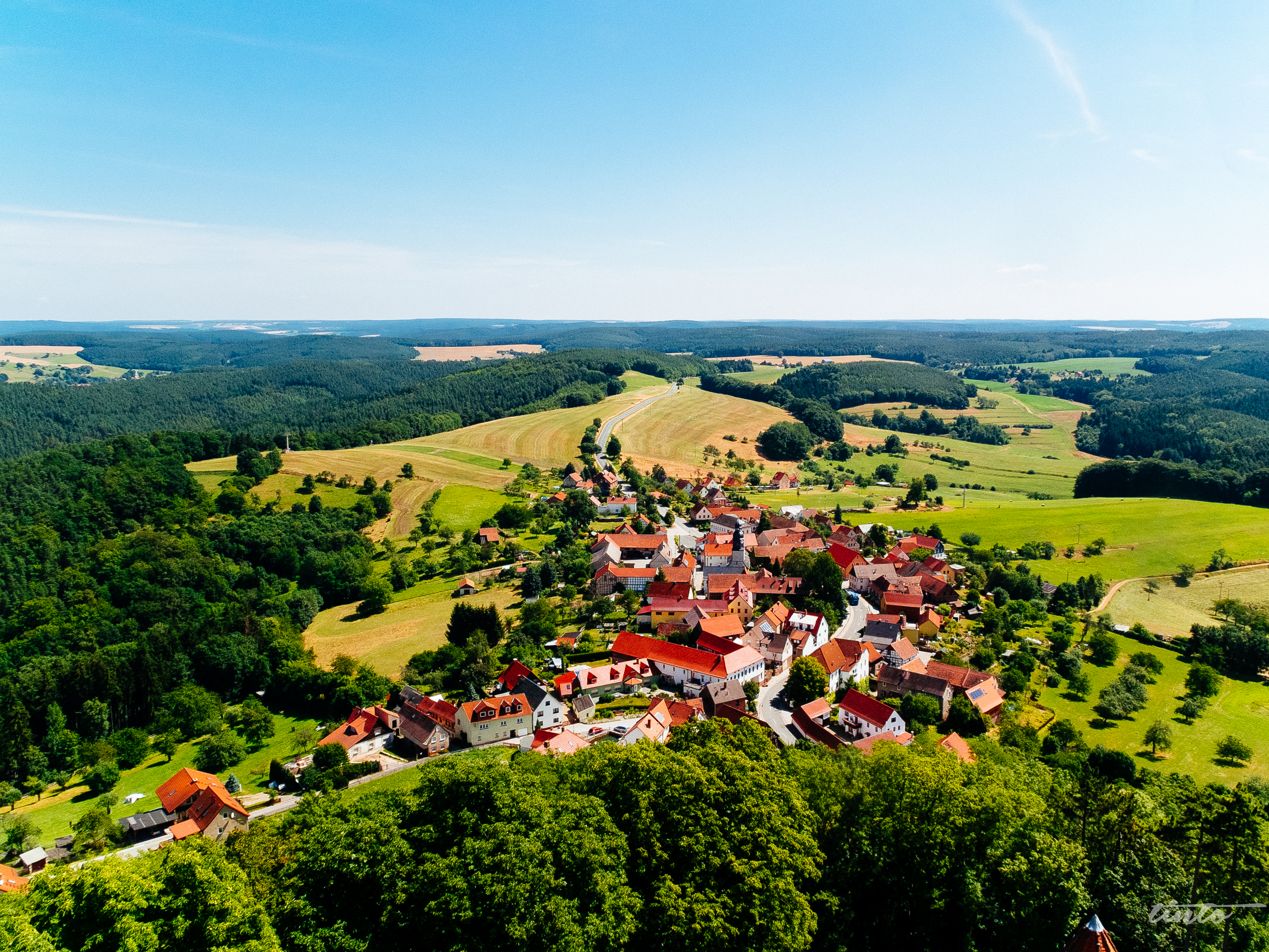

- Location of Seitenroda within Saale-Holzland-Kreis district
- Interactive map of Seitenroda
- Location within Germany Location within Thuringia
- Coordinates: 50°48′15″N 11°37′5″E
- Country: Germany
- State: Thuringia
- District: Saale-Holzland-Kreis
- Municipal assoc.: Südliches Saaletal

Government
  - Mayor (2022–28): Ronald Rodeck

Area
  - Total: 4.05 km^{2} (1.56 sq mi)
- Elevation: 325 m (1,066 ft)

Population (2025-12-31)
  - Total: 205
  - Density: 50.6/km^{2} (131/sq mi)
- Time zone: UTC+01:00 (CET)
  - Summer (DST): UTC+02:00 (CEST)
- Postal codes: 07768
- Dialling codes: 036424
- Vehicle registration: SHK, EIS, SRO
- Website: www.vg-suedliches-saaletal.de

Seitenroda is a municipality in the district Saale-Holzland, in Thuringia, Germany.
