= Milda, Germany =

Milda
- Municipality
- Coat of arms

- Location of Milda within Saale-Holzland-Kreis district
- Interactive map of Milda
- Location within Germany Location within Thuringia
- Coordinates: 50°51′N 11°28′E
- Country: Germany
- State: Thuringia
- District: Saale-Holzland-Kreis
- Municipal assoc.: Südliches Saaletal

Government
  - Mayor (2022–28): Albert Weiler

Area
  - Total: 22.08 km^{2} (8.53 sq mi)
- Elevation: 405 m (1,329 ft)

Population (2025-12-31)
  - Total: 728
  - Density: 33.0/km^{2} (85.4/sq mi)
- Time zone: UTC+01:00 (CET)
  - Summer (DST): UTC+02:00 (CEST)
- Postal codes: 07751
- Dialling codes: 036422
- Vehicle registration: SHK, EIS, SRO
- Website: www.vg-suedliches-saaletal.de

Milda is a municipality in the district Saale-Holzland, in Thuringia, Germany.
