= Gumperda =

- Municipality
- Location of Gumperda within Saale-Holzland-Kreis district
- Interactive map of Gumperda
- Location within Germany Location within Thuringia
- Coordinates: 50°48′36″N 11°31′24″E
- Country: Germany
- State: Thuringia
- District: Saale-Holzland-Kreis
- Municipal assoc.: Südliches Saaletal

Government
  - Mayor (2022–28): Holger Schmidt

Area
  - Total: 6.27 km^{2} (2.42 sq mi)
- Elevation: 216 m (709 ft)

Population (2025-12-31)
  - Total: 396
  - Density: 63.2/km^{2} (164/sq mi)
- Time zone: UTC+01:00 (CET)
  - Summer (DST): UTC+02:00 (CEST)
- Postal codes: 07768
- Dialling codes: 036422
- Vehicle registration: SHK, EIS, SRO
- Website: www.vg-suedliches-saaletal.de

Gumperda is a municipality in the district Saale-Holzland, in Thuringia, Germany.
