= Bucha, Saale-Holzland =

Bucha
- Municipality
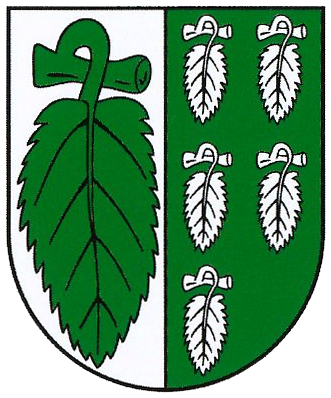
- Coat of arms

- Location of Bucha within Saale-Holzland-Kreis district
- Interactive map of Bucha
- Location within Germany Location within Thuringia
- Coordinates: 50°52′51″N 11°30′41″E
- Country: Germany
- State: Thuringia
- District: Saale-Holzland-Kreis
- Municipal assoc.: Südliches Saaletal

Government
  - Mayor (2019–25): Hans-Joachim Loeper

Area
  - Total: 21.02 km^{2} (8.12 sq mi)
- Elevation: 350 m (1,150 ft)

Population (2025-12-31)
  - Total: 1,160
  - Density: 55.2/km^{2} (143/sq mi)
- Time zone: UTC+01:00 (CET)
  - Summer (DST): UTC+02:00 (CEST)
- Postal codes: 07751
- Dialling codes: 03641
- Vehicle registration: SHK, EIS, SRO
- Website: www.vg-suedliches-saaletal.de

Bucha (German pronunciation: [ˈbuːxa]) is a municipality in the district Saale-Holzland, in Thuringia, Germany.
