= Hummelshain =

- Municipality
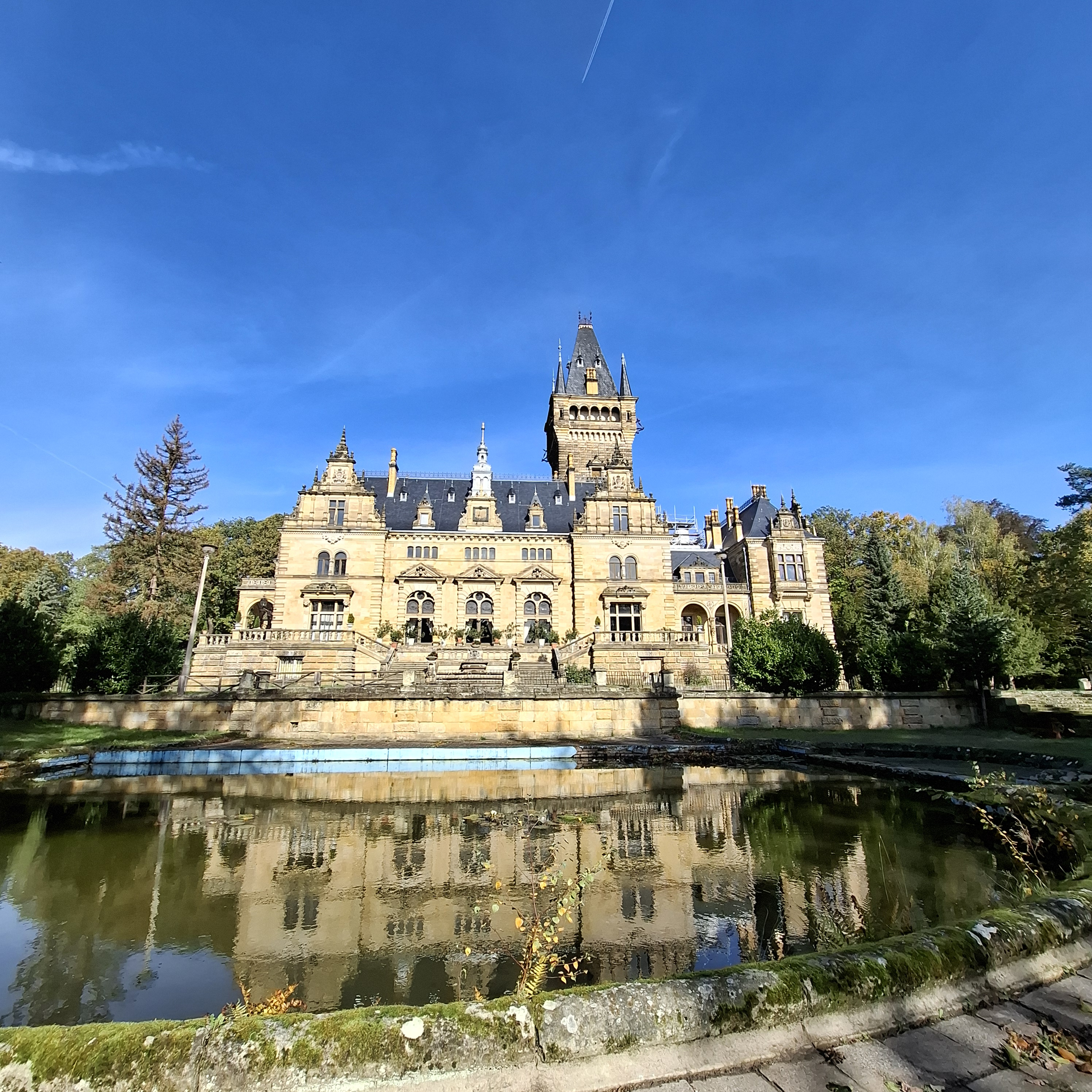

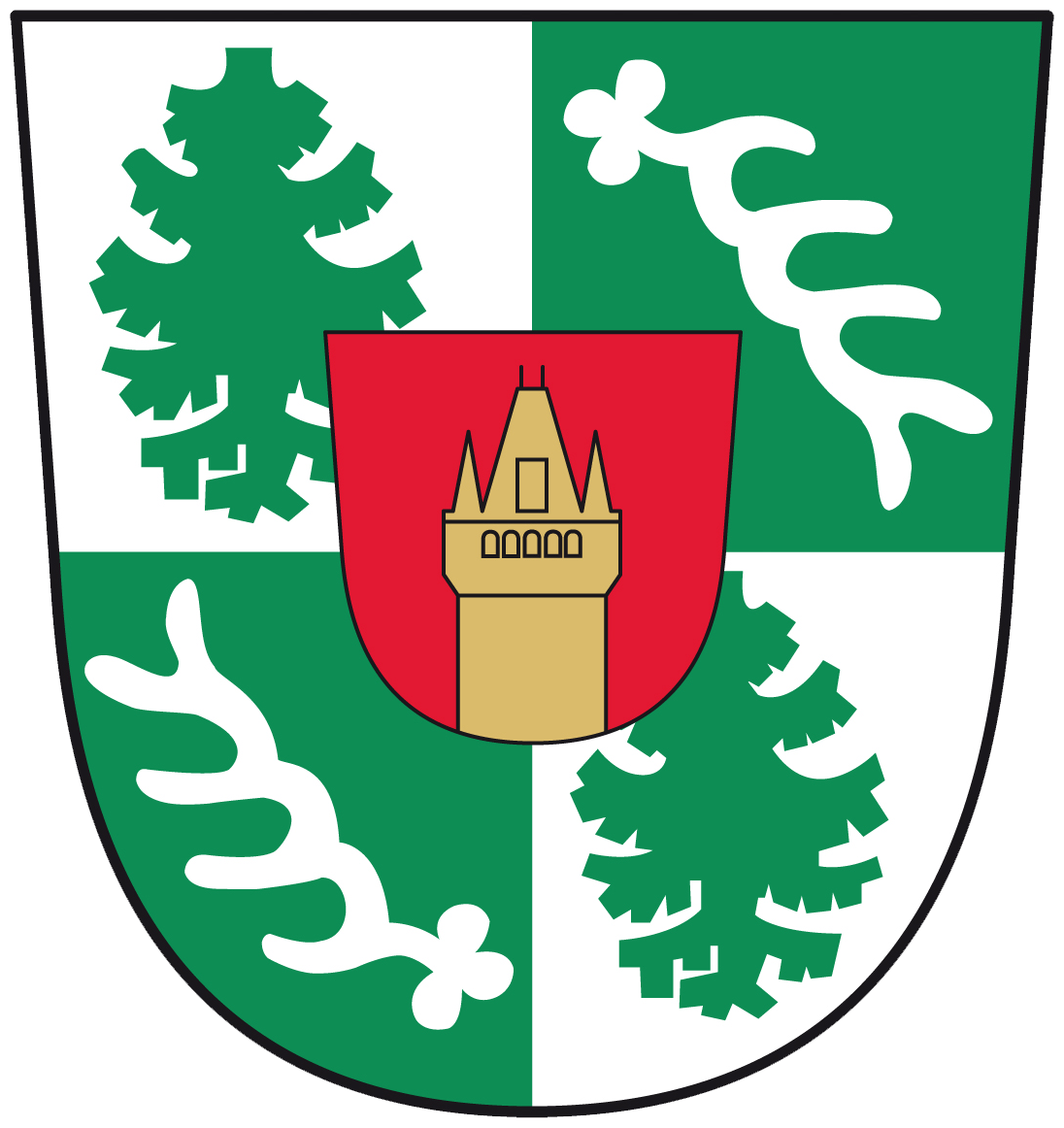
- Coat of arms

- Location of Hummelshain within Saale-Holzland-Kreis district
- Interactive map of Hummelshain
- Location within Germany Location within Thuringia
- Coordinates: 50°46′1″N 11°37′47″E
- Country: Germany
- State: Thuringia
- District: Saale-Holzland-Kreis
- Municipal assoc.: Südliches Saaletal

Government
  - Mayor (2022–28): Stephan Tiesler (CDU)

Area
  - Total: 17.57 km^{2} (6.78 sq mi)
- Elevation: 340 m (1,120 ft)

Population (2025-12-31)
  - Total: 605
  - Density: 34.4/km^{2} (89.2/sq mi)
- Time zone: UTC+01:00 (CET)
  - Summer (DST): UTC+02:00 (CEST)
- Postal codes: 07768
- Dialling codes: 036424
- Vehicle registration: SHK, EIS, SRO
- Website: www.vg-suedliches-saaletal.de

Hummelshain is a municipality in the district Saale-Holzland, in Thuringia, Germany. Human settlement is documented since the year 1000, the village name being first mentioned in 1349.

The most important historical site is the castle park with new and old castle (Neues Jagschloss and Altes Schloss).
