= Bibra, Saale-Holzland =

Bibra
- Municipality
- Coat of arms

- Location of Bibra within Saale-Holzland-Kreis district
- Interactive map of Bibra
- Location within Germany Location within Thuringia
- Coordinates: 50°48′15″N 11°32′46″E
- Country: Germany
- State: Thuringia
- District: Saale-Holzland-Kreis
- Municipal assoc.: Südliches Saaletal

Government
  - Mayor (2019–25): Udo Große

Area
  - Total: 4.38 km^{2} (1.69 sq mi)
- Elevation: 191 m (627 ft)

Population (2025-12-31)
  - Total: 273
  - Density: 62.3/km^{2} (161/sq mi)
- Time zone: UTC+01:00 (CET)
  - Summer (DST): UTC+02:00 (CEST)
- Postal codes: 07768
- Dialling codes: 036424
- Vehicle registration: SHK, EIS, SRO
- Website: www.vg-suedliches-saaletal.de

Bibra (German pronunciation: [ˈbiːbʁa]) is a municipality in the district Saale-Holzland, in Thuringia, Germany.
