= Südliches Saaletal =

Municipal association in Thuringia, Germany

- Verwaltungsgemeinschaft
- Map of Saale-Holzland highlighting Südliches Saaletal
- Interactive map of Südliches Saaletal
- Location within Germany Location within Thuringia
- Coordinates: 50°49′N 11°33′E
- Country: Germany
- State: Thuringia
- District: Saale-Holzland
- Seat: Kahla
- Subdivisions: 21 municipalities

Area
  - Total: 186.09 km^{2} (71.85 sq mi)

Population (2025-12-31)
  - Total: 11,241
  - Density: 60.406/km^{2} (156.45/sq mi)
- Time zone: UTC+01:00 (CET)
  - Summer (DST): UTC+02:00 (CEST)
- Website: www.vg-suedliches-saaletal.de

Südliches Saaletal is a Verwaltungsgemeinschaft ("collective municipality") in the district Saale-Holzland, in Thuringia, Germany. The seat of the Verwaltungsgemeinschaft is in Kahla, itself not part of the Verwaltungsgemeinschaft.

The Verwaltungsgemeinschaft Südliches Saaletal consists of the following municipalities:

1. Altenberga
2. Bibra
3. Bucha
4. Eichenberg
5. Freienorla
6. Großeutersdorf
7. Großpürschütz
8. Gumperda
9. Hummelshain
10. Kleineutersdorf
11. Laasdorf
12. Lindig
13. Milda
14. Orlamünde
15. Reinstädt
16. Rothenstein
17. Schöps
18. Seitenroda
19. Sulza
20. Unterbodnitz
21. Zöllnitz
