= Zell im Fichtelgebirge =

- Municipality
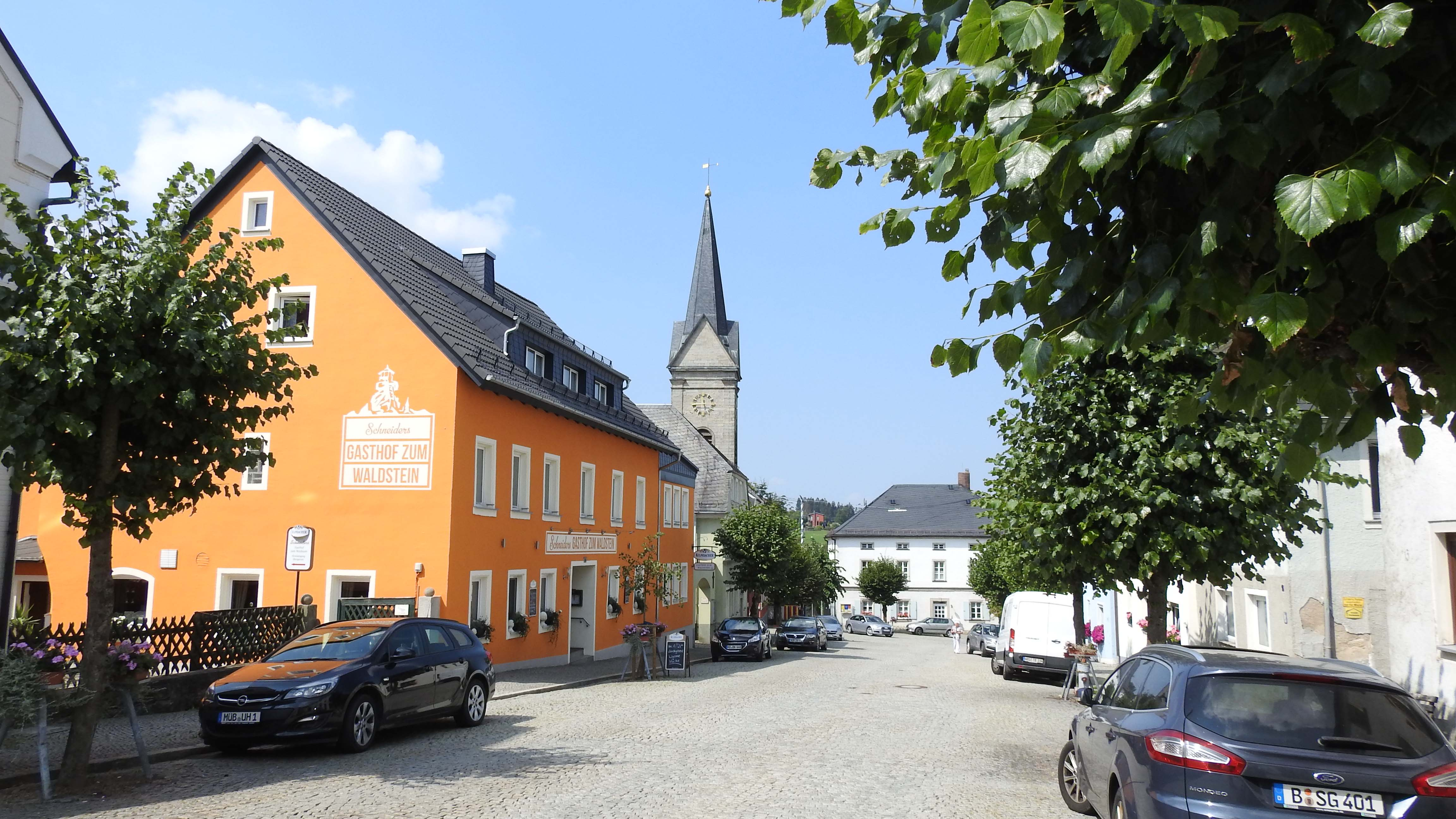
- Market square

- Coat of arms

- Location of Zell im Fichtelgebirge within Hof district
- Interactive map of Zell im Fichtelgebirge
- Location within Germany Location within Bavaria
- Coordinates: 50°7′N 11°48′E
- Country: Germany
- State: Bavaria
- Admin. region: Oberfranken
- District: Hof

Government
  - Mayor (2020–26): Horst Penzel

Area
  - Total: 31.23 km^{2} (12.06 sq mi)
- Elevation: 615 m (2,018 ft)

Population (2025-12-31)
  - Total: 1,809
  - Density: 57.93/km^{2} (150.0/sq mi)
- Time zone: UTC+01:00 (CET)
  - Summer (DST): UTC+02:00 (CEST)
- Postal codes: 95239
- Dialling codes: 09257
- Vehicle registration: HO
- Website: www.markt-zell.de

Zell im Fichtelgebirge (German pronunciation: [ˈtsɛl ʔɪm ˈfɪçtl̩ɡəˌbɪʁɡə], lit. 'Zell in the Fichtel Mountains'), formerly Zell (official name until July 2007) is a market town in the district of Hof in Bavaria in Germany.

== Geography ==
The heart of the market parish lies between the towns of Hof and Bayreuth, about 5 km from the B 2 federal road and about 10 km from the A 9 motorway. The River Saale rises on the Waldstein ridge in the Fichtel Mountains near Zell im Fichtelgebirge. The surrounding area may explored on some 30 kilometres of signposted hiking trails.
