= Laasdorf =

- Municipality
- Location of Laasdorf within Saale-Holzland-Kreis district
- Interactive map of Laasdorf
- Location within Germany Location within Thuringia
- Coordinates: 50°52′N 11°40′E
- Country: Germany
- State: Thuringia
- District: Saale-Holzland-Kreis
- Municipal assoc.: Südliches Saaletal

Government
  - Mayor (2022–28): Jens Conrad

Area
  - Total: 4.04 km^{2} (1.56 sq mi)
- Elevation: 170 m (560 ft)

Population (2025-12-31)
  - Total: 532
  - Density: 132/km^{2} (341/sq mi)
- Time zone: UTC+01:00 (CET)
  - Summer (DST): UTC+02:00 (CEST)
- Postal codes: 07646
- Dialling codes: 036428
- Vehicle registration: SHK, EIS, SRO
- Website: www.vg-suedliches-saaletal.de

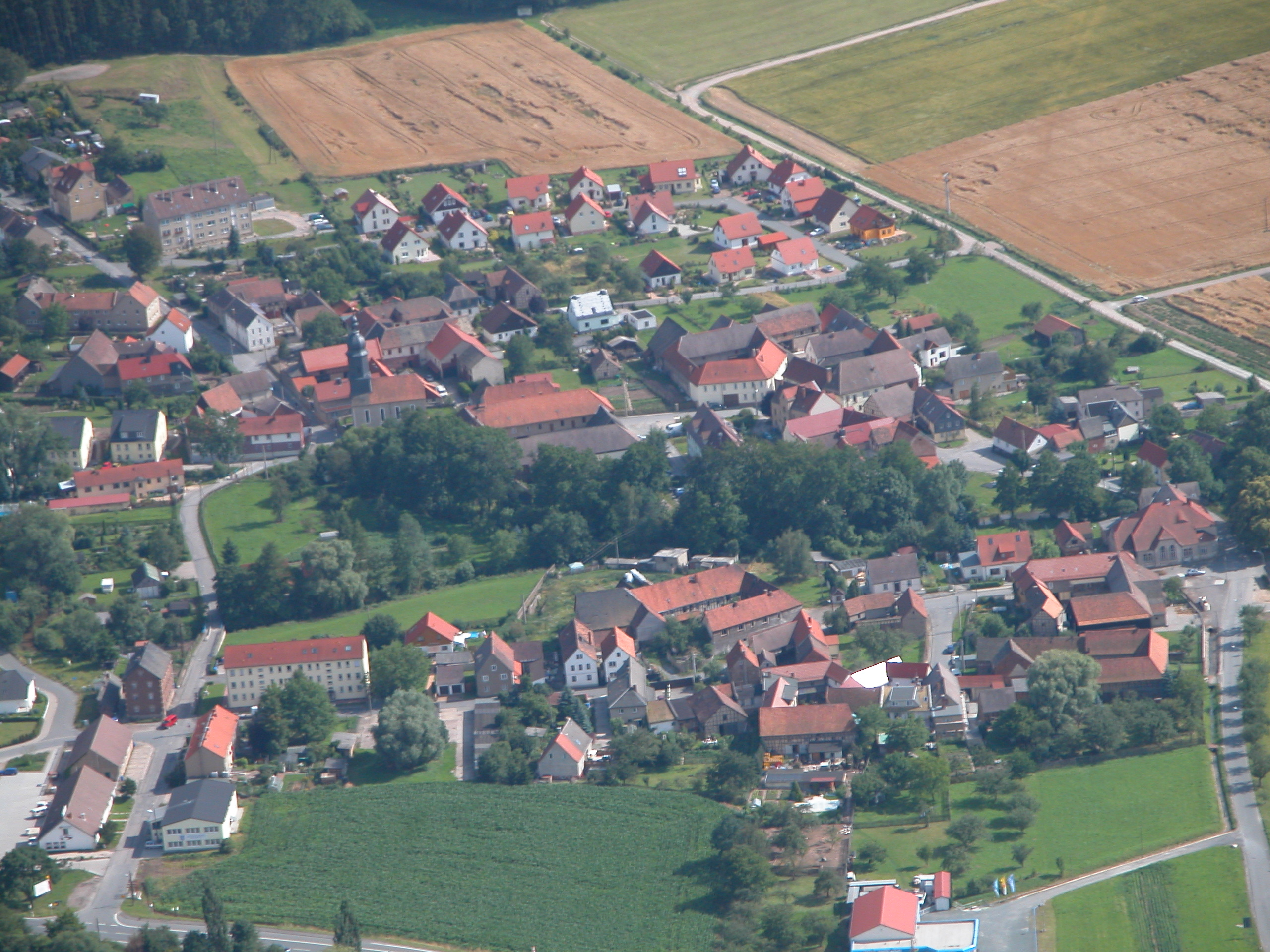

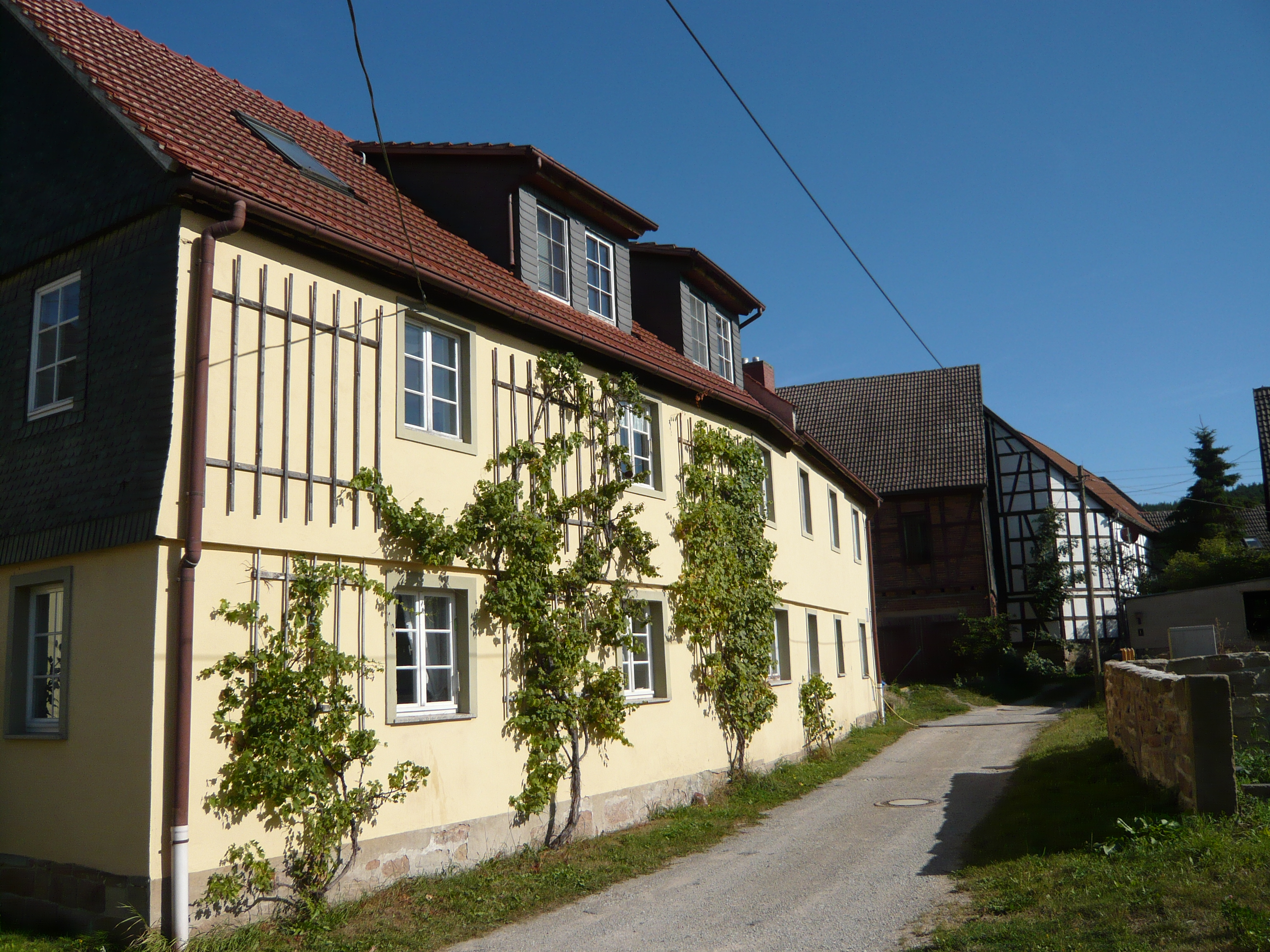
Laasdorf

Laasdorf is a municipality in the district Saale-Holzland, in Thuringia, Germany. As of December 31, 2024, it had a population of 532 people, consisting of 258 males and 274 females.
