= Großpürschütz =

- Municipality
- Coat of arms

- Location of Großpürschütz within Saale-Holzland-Kreis district
- Interactive map of Großpürschütz
- Location within Germany Location within Thuringia
- Coordinates: 50°49′15″N 11°35′33″E
- Country: Germany
- State: Thuringia
- District: Saale-Holzland-Kreis
- Municipal assoc.: Südliches Saaletal

Government
  - Mayor (2022–28): Steffen Jünge

Area
  - Total: 3.97 km^{2} (1.53 sq mi)
- Elevation: 168 m (551 ft)

Population (2025-12-31)
  - Total: 376
  - Density: 94.7/km^{2} (245/sq mi)
- Time zone: UTC+01:00 (CET)
  - Summer (DST): UTC+02:00 (CEST)
- Postal codes: 07751
- Dialling codes: 036424
- Vehicle registration: SHK, EIS, SRO
- Website: www.vg-suedliches-saaletal.de

Großpürschütz is a municipality in the district Saale-Holzland, in Thuringia, Germany.
