= Rothenstein, Germany =

Rothenstein
- Municipality
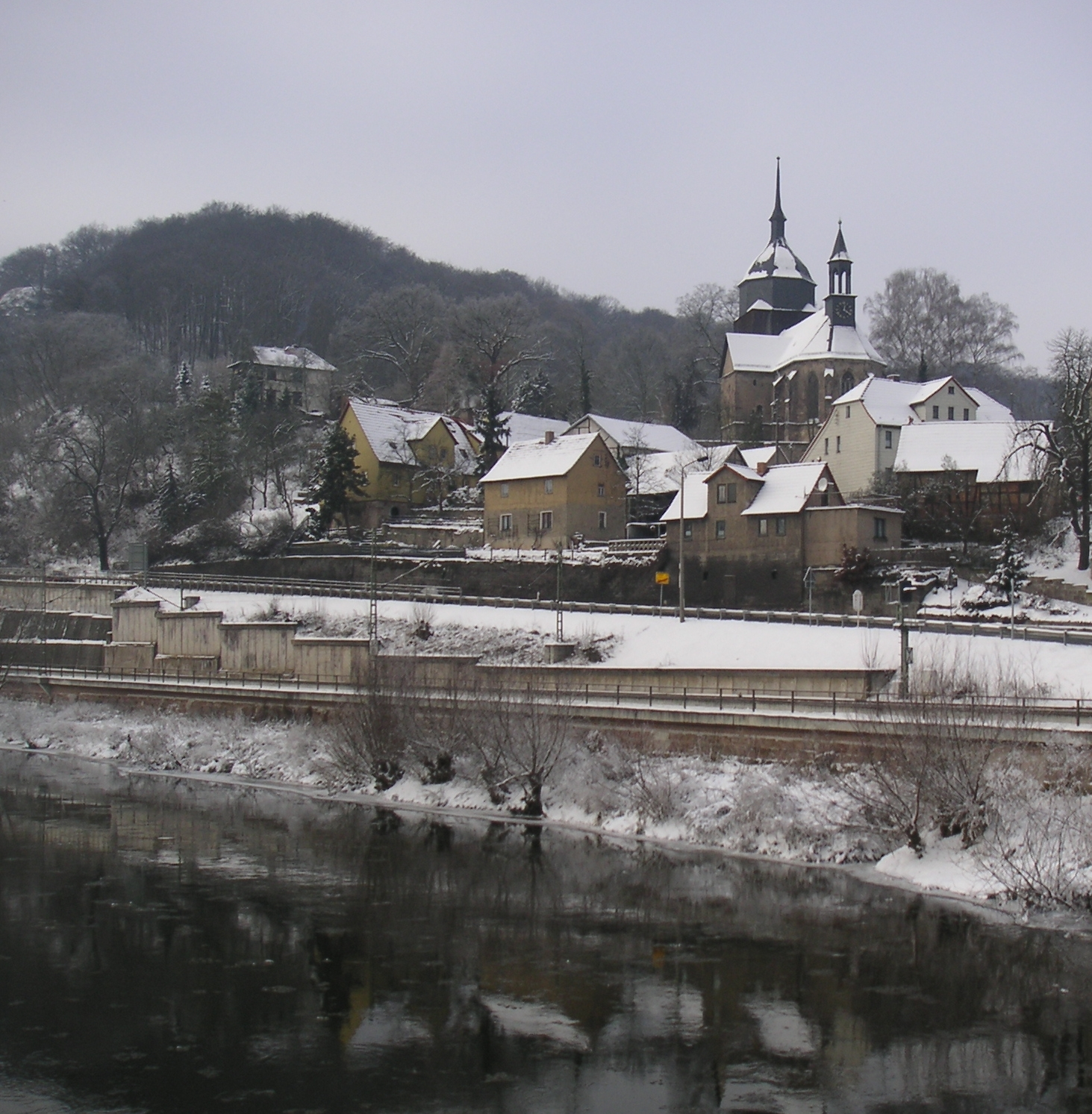

- Location of Rothenstein within Saale-Holzland-Kreis district
- Interactive map of Rothenstein
- Location within Germany Location within Thuringia
- Coordinates: 50°50′58″N 11°36′19″E
- Country: Germany
- State: Thuringia
- District: Saale-Holzland-Kreis
- Municipal assoc.: Südliches Saaletal

Government
  - Mayor (2024–30): Matthias Kühne

Area
  - Total: 10.45 km^{2} (4.03 sq mi)
- Elevation: 160 m (520 ft)

Population (2025-12-31)
  - Total: 1,134
  - Density: 108.5/km^{2} (281.1/sq mi)
- Time zone: UTC+01:00 (CET)
  - Summer (DST): UTC+02:00 (CEST)
- Postal codes: 07751
- Dialling codes: 036424
- Vehicle registration: SHK, EIS, SRO
- Website: www.vg-suedliches-saaletal.de

Rothenstein (German pronunciation: [ˈʁoːtn̩ʃtaɪn]) is a municipality in the district Saale-Holzland, in Thuringia, Germany.
