= Kleineutersdorf =

- Municipality
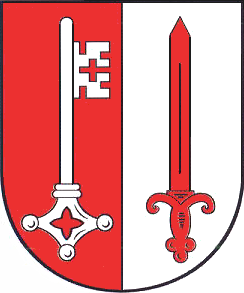
- Coat of arms

- Location of Kleineutersdorf within Saale-Holzland-Kreis district
- Interactive map of Kleineutersdorf
- Location within Germany Location within Thuringia
- Coordinates: 50°47′N 11°35′E
- Country: Germany
- State: Thuringia
- District: Saale-Holzland-Kreis
- Municipal assoc.: Südliches Saaletal

Government
  - Mayor (2022–28): Roy Tröbst

Area
  - Total: 5.61 km^{2} (2.17 sq mi)
- Elevation: 178 m (584 ft)

Population (2025-12-31)
  - Total: 321
  - Density: 57.2/km^{2} (148/sq mi)
- Time zone: UTC+01:00 (CET)
  - Summer (DST): UTC+02:00 (CEST)
- Postal codes: 07768
- Dialling codes: 036424
- Vehicle registration: SHK, EIS, SRO
- Website: www.vg-suedliches-saaletal.de

Kleineutersdorf is a municipality in the district Saale-Holzland, in Thuringia, Germany.
