= Sulza =

- Municipality
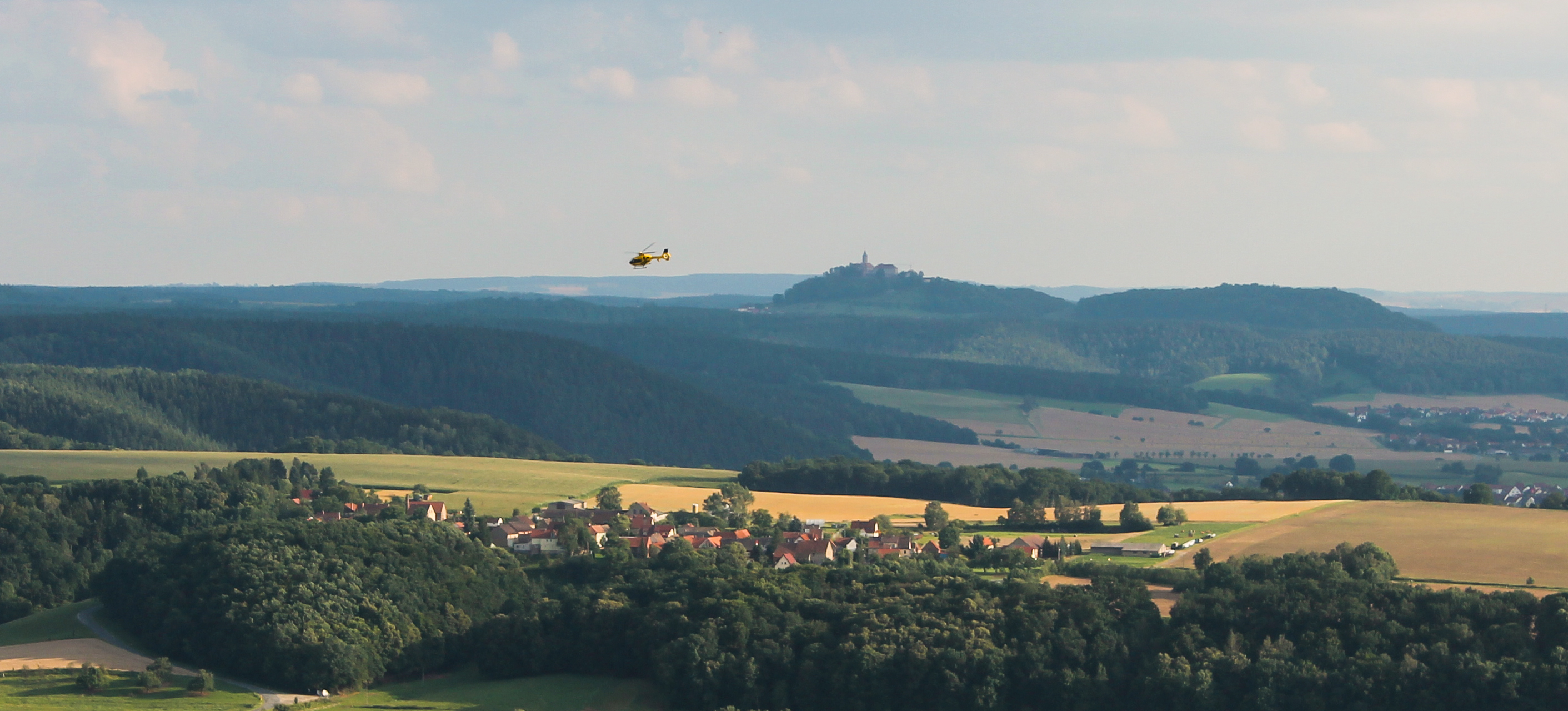

- Location of Sulza within Saale-Holzland-Kreis district
- Interactive map of Sulza
- Location within Germany Location within Thuringia
- Coordinates: 50°52′2″N 11°37′12″E
- Country: Germany
- State: Thuringia
- District: Saale-Holzland-Kreis
- Municipal assoc.: Südliches Saaletal

Government
  - Mayor (2022–28): Alf Dalibor

Area
  - Total: 3.96 km^{2} (1.53 sq mi)
- Elevation: 212 m (696 ft)

Population (2025-12-31)
  - Total: 264
  - Density: 66.7/km^{2} (173/sq mi)
- Time zone: UTC+01:00 (CET)
  - Summer (DST): UTC+02:00 (CEST)
- Postal codes: 07751
- Dialling codes: 03641
- Vehicle registration: SHK, EIS, SRO
- Website: www.vg-suedliches-saaletal.de

Sulza is a municipality in the district Saale-Holzland, in Thuringia, Germany.
