= Großeutersdorf =

- Municipality
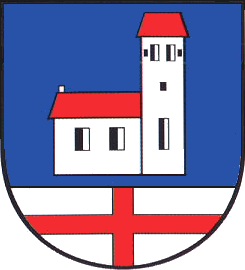
- Coat of arms

- Location of Großeutersdorf within Saale-Holzland-Kreis district
- Interactive map of Großeutersdorf
- Location within Germany Location within Thuringia
- Coordinates: 50°47′21″N 11°33′52″E
- Country: Germany
- State: Thuringia
- District: Saale-Holzland-Kreis
- Municipal assoc.: Südliches Saaletal

Government
  - Mayor (2022–28): Jens Hild

Area
  - Total: 3.45 km^{2} (1.33 sq mi)
- Elevation: 168 m (551 ft)

Population (2025-12-31)
  - Total: 263
  - Density: 76.2/km^{2} (197/sq mi)
- Time zone: UTC+01:00 (CET)
  - Summer (DST): UTC+02:00 (CEST)
- Postal codes: 07768
- Dialling codes: 036424
- Vehicle registration: SHK, EIS, SRO
- Website: www.grosseutersdorf.de

Großeutersdorf is a municipality in the district Saale-Holzland, in Thuringia, Germany.
