= Freienorla =

- Municipality
- Location of Freienorla within Saale-Holzland-Kreis district
- Interactive map of Freienorla
- Location within Germany Location within Thuringia
- Coordinates: 50°46′10″N 11°32′34″E
- Country: Germany
- State: Thuringia
- District: Saale-Holzland-Kreis
- Municipal assoc.: Südliches Saaletal

Government
  - Mayor (2022–28): Runa Partschefeld

Area
  - Total: 6.81 km^{2} (2.63 sq mi)
- Elevation: 180 m (590 ft)

Population (2025-12-31)
  - Total: 310
  - Density: 46/km^{2} (120/sq mi)
- Time zone: UTC+01:00 (CET)
  - Summer (DST): UTC+02:00 (CEST)
- Postal codes: 07768
- Dialling codes: 036423
- Vehicle registration: SHK, EIS, SRO
- Website: www.freienorla.de

Freienorla is located in the German state of Thuringia. Although quite small and obscure, the municipality is known locally for its Gothic church as well as its lower mill, a watermill facility thought to be built in the tenth century. The Orlabahn railroad has a station located in Freienorla. Neighboring towns include Jena and Eisenberg. Freienorla is located 145 miles from the capital of Berlin.

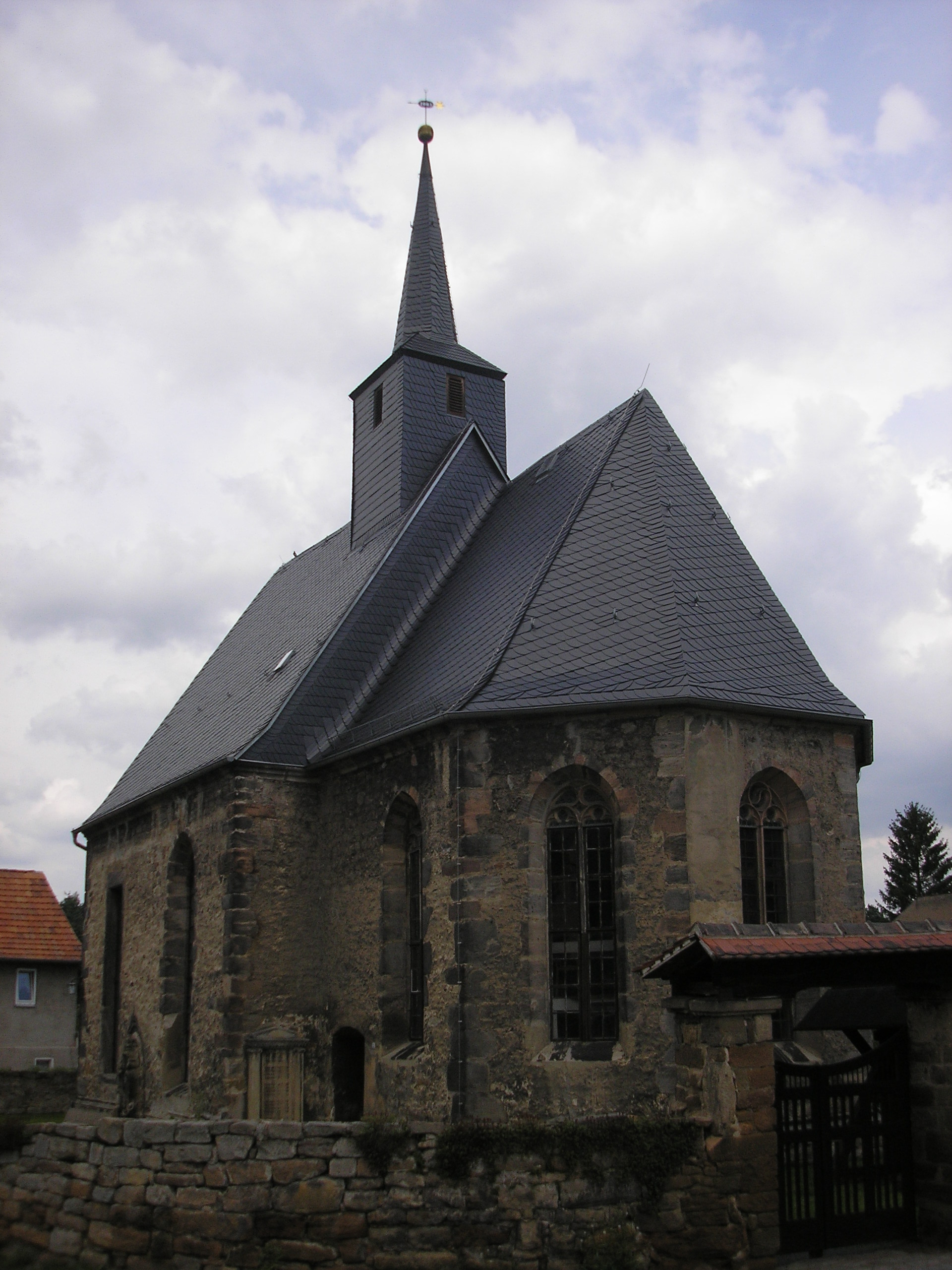
Gothic church

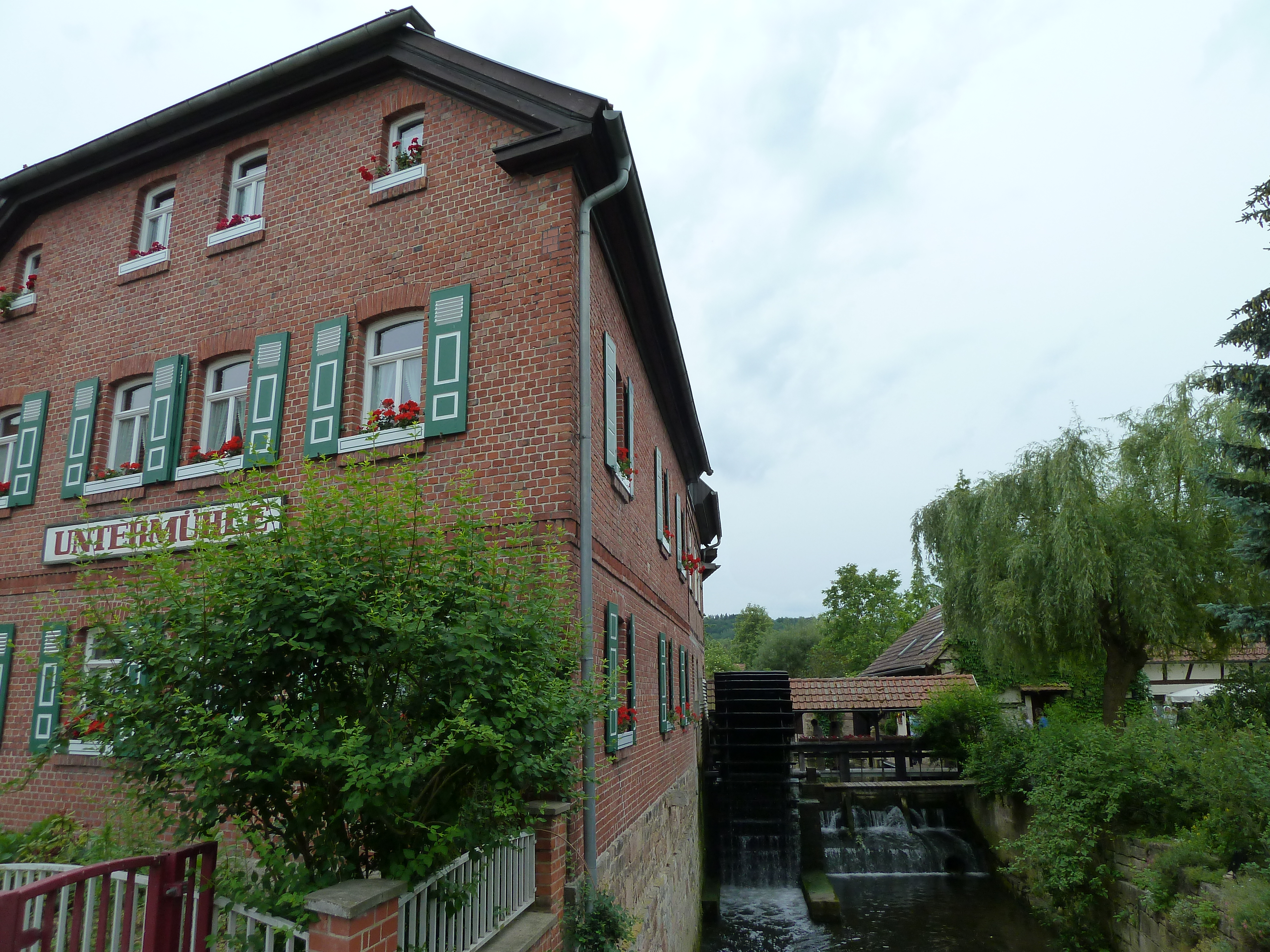
Lower mill
