= Wichmar =

- Municipality
- Location of Wichmar within Saale-Holzland-Kreis district
- Interactive map of Wichmar
- Location within Germany Location within Thuringia
- Coordinates: 51°2′0″N 11°41′24″E
- Country: Germany
- State: Thuringia
- District: Saale-Holzland-Kreis
- Municipal assoc.: Dornburg-Camburg

Government
  - Mayor (2022–28): Timo Schmidt

Area
  - Total: 5.38 km^{2} (2.08 sq mi)
- Elevation: 140 m (460 ft)

Population (2025-12-31)
  - Total: 225
  - Density: 41.8/km^{2} (108/sq mi)
- Time zone: UTC+01:00 (CET)
  - Summer (DST): UTC+02:00 (CEST)
- Postal codes: 07774
- Dialling codes: 036421
- Vehicle registration: SHK, EIS, SRO

Wichmar is a municipality in the district Saale-Holzland, in Thuringia, Germany.
