= Schkopau =

- Municipality
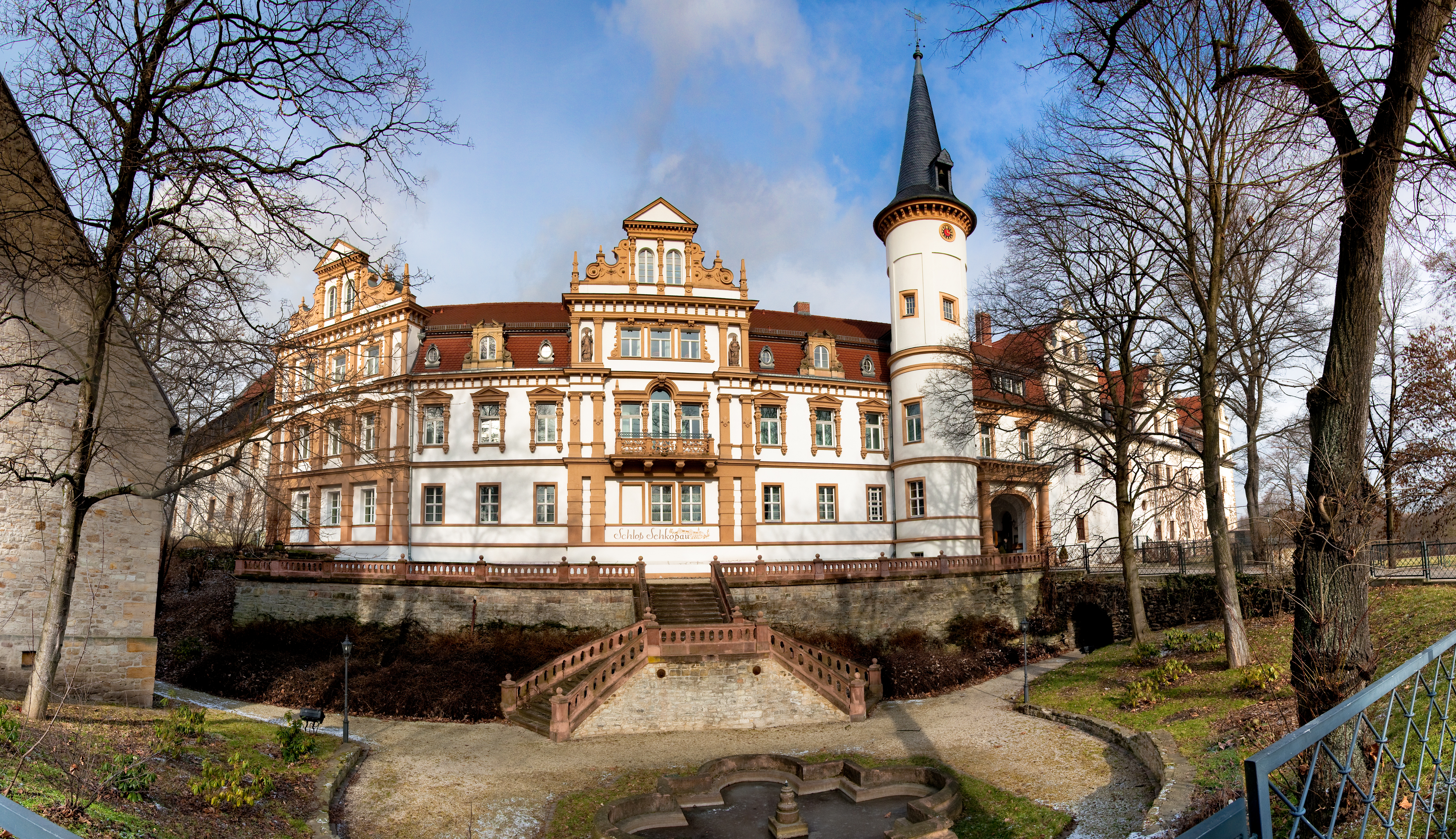
- Schkopau Castle

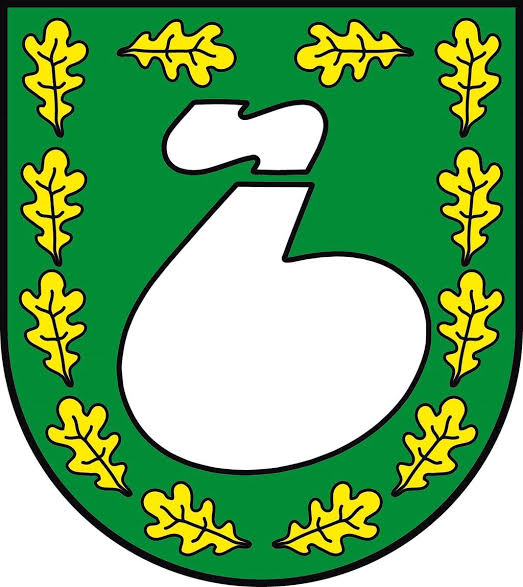
- Coat of arms

- Location of Schkopau within Saalekreis district
- Interactive map of Schkopau
- Location within Germany Location within Saxony-Anhalt
- Coordinates: 51°23′N 11°58′E
- Country: Germany
- State: Saxony-Anhalt
- District: Saalekreis

Government
  - Mayor (2018–25): Torsten Ringling

Area
  - Total: 99.74 km^{2} (38.51 sq mi)
- Elevation: 98 m (322 ft)

Population (2025-12-31)
  - Total: 10,646
  - Density: 106.7/km^{2} (276.4/sq mi)
- Time zone: UTC+01:00 (CET)
  - Summer (DST): UTC+02:00 (CEST)
- Postal codes: 06258
- Dialling codes: 03461
- Vehicle registration: SK
- Website: www.gemeinde-schkopau.de

Schkopau (German pronunciation: [ˈʃkoːpaʊ]) is a municipality in the Saalekreis district, in Saxony-Anhalt, Germany.

== Geography ==
It is situated at the confluence of the Saale River with its White Elster and Luppe tributaries, approx. 6 kilometres (3.7 mi) north of Merseburg, and 10 km (6.2 mi) south of Halle.

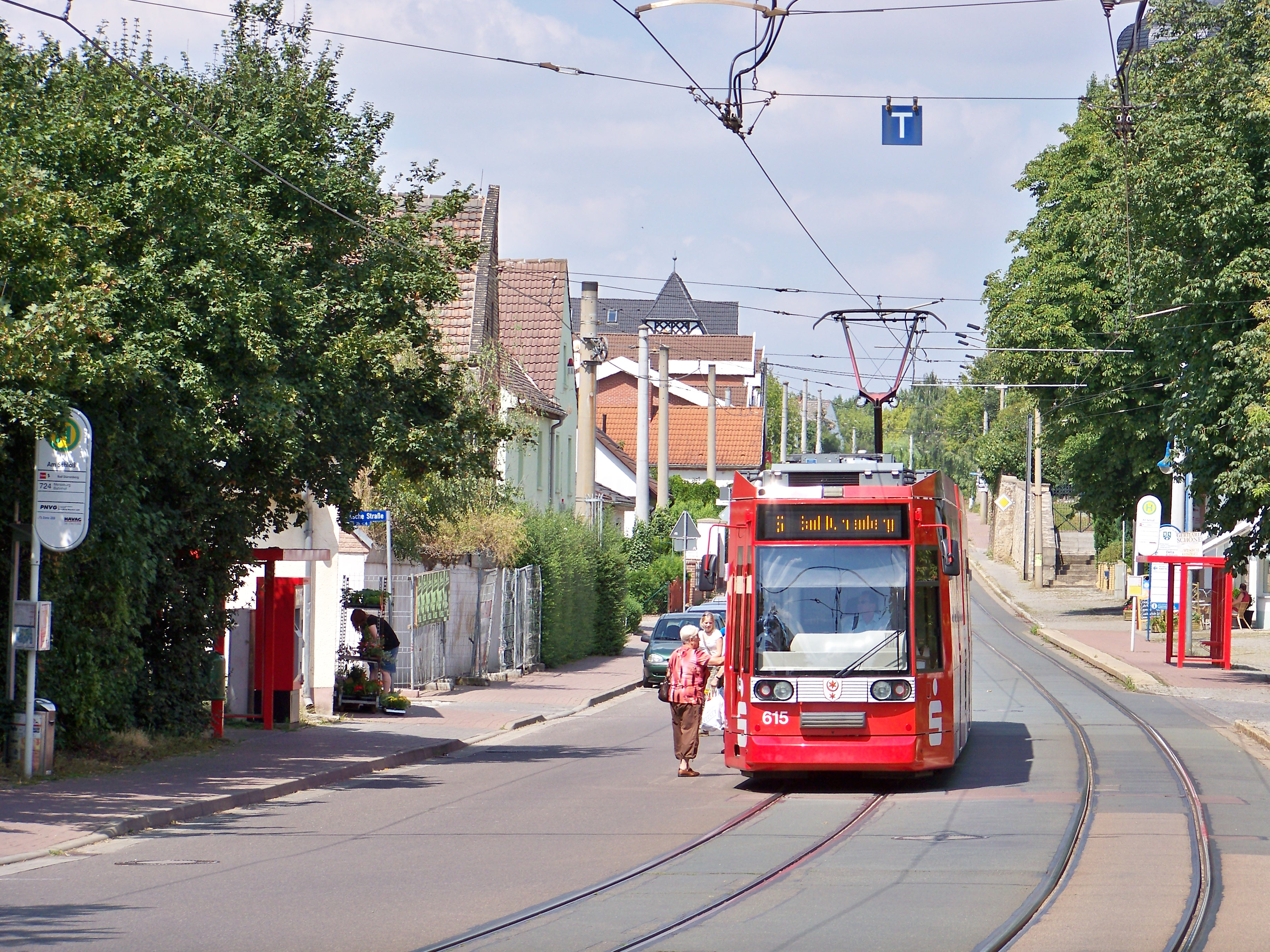
Streetcar in Schkopau

Schkopau station is a stop on the Thuringian Railway line from Halle to Eisenach. Another connection is provided by an interurban tramway line from Halle to Bad Dürrenberg. Beside the resident chemical industry, the municipality is the site of the Schkopau Power Station, a brown coal power plant run by the E.ON electric utility.

The municipal area comprises the localities of Burgliebenau, Döllnitz, Ermlitz, Hohenweiden, Knapendorf, Korbetha, Lochau, Luppenau, Raßnitz, Röglitz, Schkopau, and Wallendorf.

== History ==
A Scapowe Castle was first mentioned in an 1177 deed. Already in the ninth century, a Carolingian fortress had been erected on the Saale River, then the eastern border of East Francia with the lands of the Polabian Slavs.

In 1215, King Frederick II endowed it to the Archbishop of Magdeburg, who already held the nearby town of Halle. Enfeoffed to the Bishop of Merseburg in 1444 and held by the Trotha noble family from 1477 onwards, the castle was rebuilt several times, recently in 1876 in a Renaissance Revival style. Today it is used as a hotel.

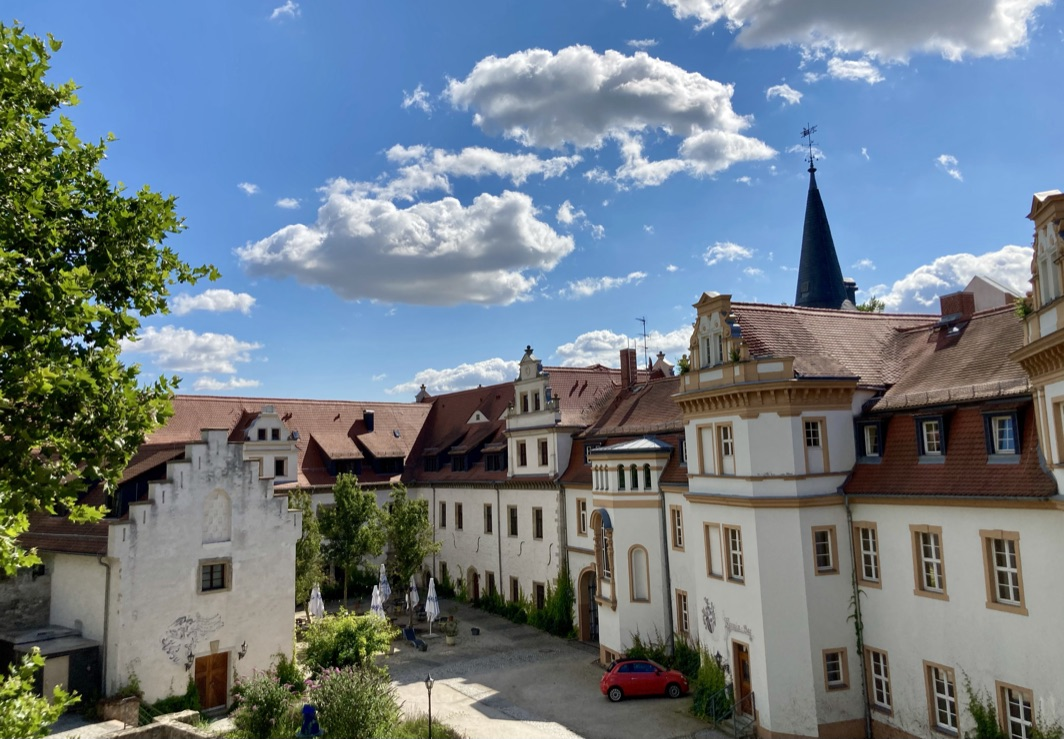
Schkopau castle courtyard

In April 1936, the Buna (i.e. butadiene-natrium polymer) synthetic rubber company was established in Schkopau, part of the Nazi efforts to make German economy self-sufficient in view of coming World War II. The Schkopau works were a subsidiary of the Leuna chemical company, itself part of the vast IG Farben industry conglomerate. Production started in 1937; beside rubber it included polyvinyl chloride (PVC), trichloroethylene, formaldehyde, tetrahydrofuran (THF), acetic acid and acetic anhydride, as well as acetone.

During the war, the Schkopau plant was the greatest producer of Axis synthetic rubber (>17%). It ran the Buna Werke branch in Oświęcim, where the Monowitz concentration camp (Auschwitz III) was erected, a labor camp (Arbeitslager) with numerous forced labourers working under cruel treatment.

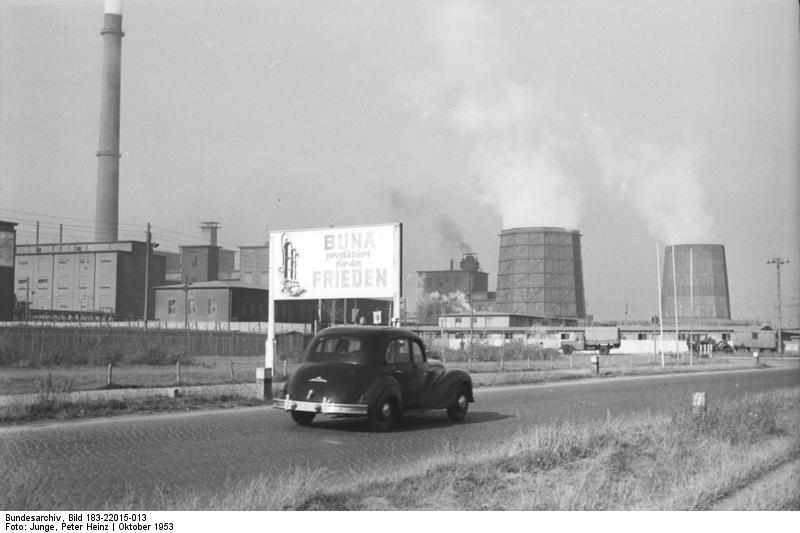
Schkopau Buna plant, 1953

After the war, the Schkopau plant was seized by the Soviet Military Administration in Germany and re-organised as a Publicly Owned Operation (Volkseigener Betrieb, VEB) of East Germany. The VEB Chemische Werke Buna combine, the world's largest producer of carbide in 1958, became known for its Plaste und Elaste products but also for outdated production facilities and heavy industrial pollution. Taken over by the East German Treuhand agency upon the Peaceful Revolution in 1989, it is today a subsidiary of the Dow Chemical Company.

== Politics ==
Seats in the municipal assembly as of 2009 elections:

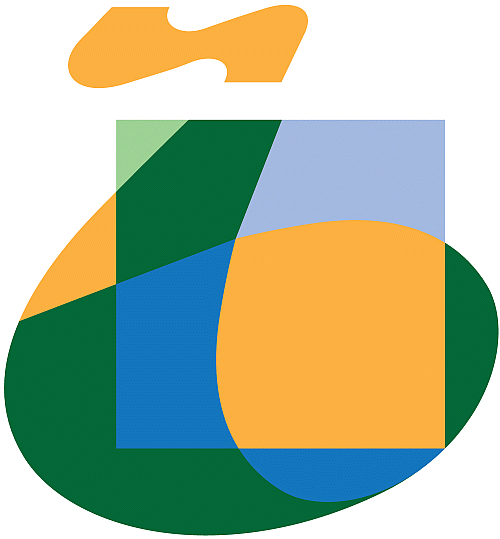
Schkopau municipal logo with stylized flask

- Free Voters: 7
- Christian Democratic Union (CDU): 7
- Social Democratic Party of Germany (SPD): 6
- The Left: 4
- Alliance '90/The Greens: 1
- Independent: 1
- Traditional Club of the Volunteer Fire Brigade: 1
- Free Democratic Party (FDP): 1

The current mayor is Torsten Ringling, elected in October 2018.

== People ==
- Ernst Ludwig Herrfurth (1830-1900), politician, member of Reichstag
