= Leuna-Kötzschau =

Former municipality in Saxony-Anhalt

Coordinates: 51.317°N 12.017°E

Leuna-Kötzschau was a Verwaltungsgemeinschaft ("collective municipality") in the Saalekreis district, in Saxony-Anhalt, Germany. The seat of the Verwaltungsgemeinschaft was in Leuna. It was disbanded in January 2010.

The Verwaltungsgemeinschaft Leuna-Kötzschau consisted of the following municipalities:

1. Friedensdorf
2. Leuna
3. Wallendorf
