= Kötzschau =

- Stadtteil of Leuna
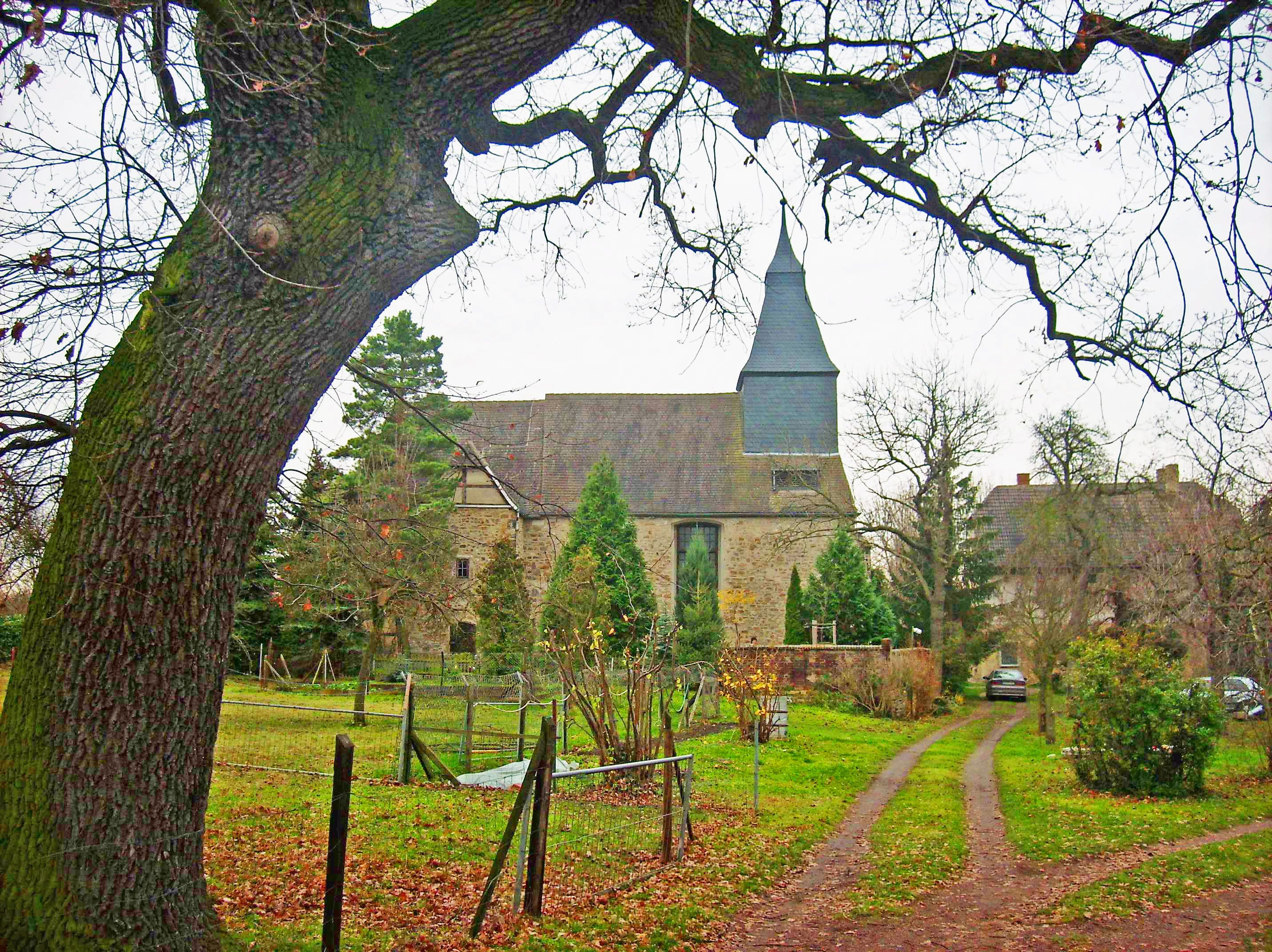
- Kötzschau church

- Coat of arms
- Interactive map of Kötzschau
- Location within Germany Location within Saxony-Anhalt
- Coordinates: 51°18′45″N 12°7′56″E
- Country: Germany
- State: Saxony-Anhalt
- District: Saalekreis
- Town: Leuna
- Subdivisions: 4

Area
  - Total: 16.77 km^{2} (6.47 sq mi)
- Elevation: 114 m (374 ft)

Population (2006-12-31)
  - Total: 1,986
  - Density: 118.4/km^{2} (306.7/sq mi)
- Time zone: UTC+01:00 (CET)
  - Summer (DST): UTC+02:00 (CEST)
- Postal codes: 06231
- Dialling codes: 03462
- Vehicle registration: SK
- Website: Kötzschau at the Leuna website

Kötzschau (German pronunciation: [ˈkœtʃaʊ]) is a village and a former municipality in the district Saalekreis, in Saxony-Anhalt, Germany. Today, it is a part of Leuna. Kötzschau is situated approximately 11 km southeast of Merseburg and has a population close to 2,000.

== Geography ==
Location of Kötzschau in Leuna

=== Location ===
Kötzschau is located to the extreme southeast of the municipality of Leuna, and to the east of Saalekreis district and of Saxony-Anhalt. It borders directly on Markranstädt, Saxony. The Saale passes to the west. The brook Bach flows from the southeast to the northwest through Kötzschau. At Schladebach, it is dammed to form the Speicher Schladebach.

=== Subdivisions ===
Kötzschau consists of the Ortsteile Kötzschau, Rampitz, Schladebach, Thalschütz and Witzschersdorf.

== History ==
Kötzschau had its first documentary mention in 1205 (Schladebach 1012, Thalschütz 1225, Witzschersdorf 1285, Rampitz 1479). For several centuries, Kötzschau was notable mainly for the presence of a local brine spring and the use of a Saline (which in German refers to a structure employed in the boiling of brine, not to salt evaporation ponds). These were first described in the early 14th century. In 1347, during the war between the Margrave of Meissen and the Archbishop of Magdeburg, Otto von Hessen, the Saline was burned down. It was subsequently rebuilt by the Elector of Saxony.

In 1597, the Elsterfloßgraben was built, a canal linking Kötzschau to the Elster Mountains to facilitate the transport of wood needed in the production of salt. The Saline was again destroyed in the Thirty Years' War but rebuilt in 1697.

In 1706/7, Kötzschau was occupied by Swedish troops during the Great Northern War and the school/rectory became the main store of animal feed for the whole army. Not far away, the Treaties of Altranstädt were signed in 1706 and 1707.

With the coming of the Industrial Revolution, as part of the region of Mitteldeutschland, Kötzschau was located in a centre of industrial activity. In 1798, the first steam engine of the Electorate was set up in Kötzschau, to pump up the brine. In 1856, the train station was built as a stop on the new railway line Erfurt-Leipzig. In 1861, the Saline was closed, all buildings were demolished. From 1857 to 1917, lignite was mined between Rampitz and Thalschütz. In 1886, Schladebach made international headlines as the location of the deepest-ever drilling (1,748 metres, a record that lasted until 1893). In 1892, lignite works and a lime kiln were set up. In 1930/1, the lime kiln was converted into an iron works, producing metal containers and ovens.

On 5 April 1945, the Witzschersdorf late Baroque Rittergut (manor) was destroyed by Allied bombing and not rebuilt.

On 1 July 1950, the Großgemeinde Kötzschau was created by merging Rampitz, Schladebach, Thalschütz and Witzschersdorf to Kötzschau.

From 2006 to 2009, Kötzschau was a member of the municipal association Leuna-Kötzschau. Since 31 December 2009/1 January 2010, the village has been a part of the municipality Leuna.

== Culture ==
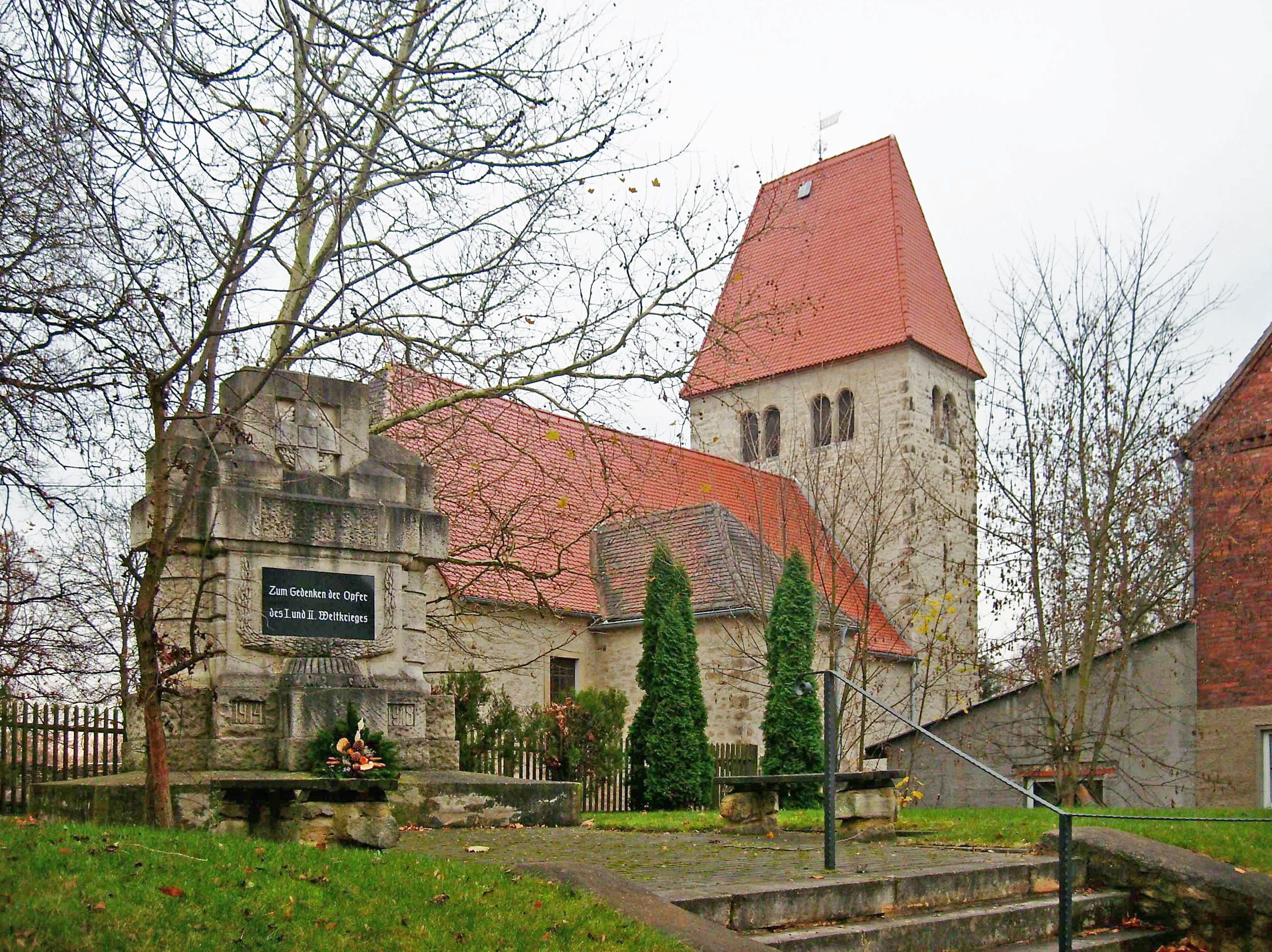
Church at Schladebach

- Eisenbahnmuseum Kötzschau - railway museum in the old station

== Transport ==
Kötzschau has a stop on the Leipzig–Großkorbetha railway. The Bundesautobahn 9 passes through the Kötzschau territory (south)east of Rampitz. The closest interchange is Bad Dürrenberg.
