= Ellerbach (Saale) =

River in Germany

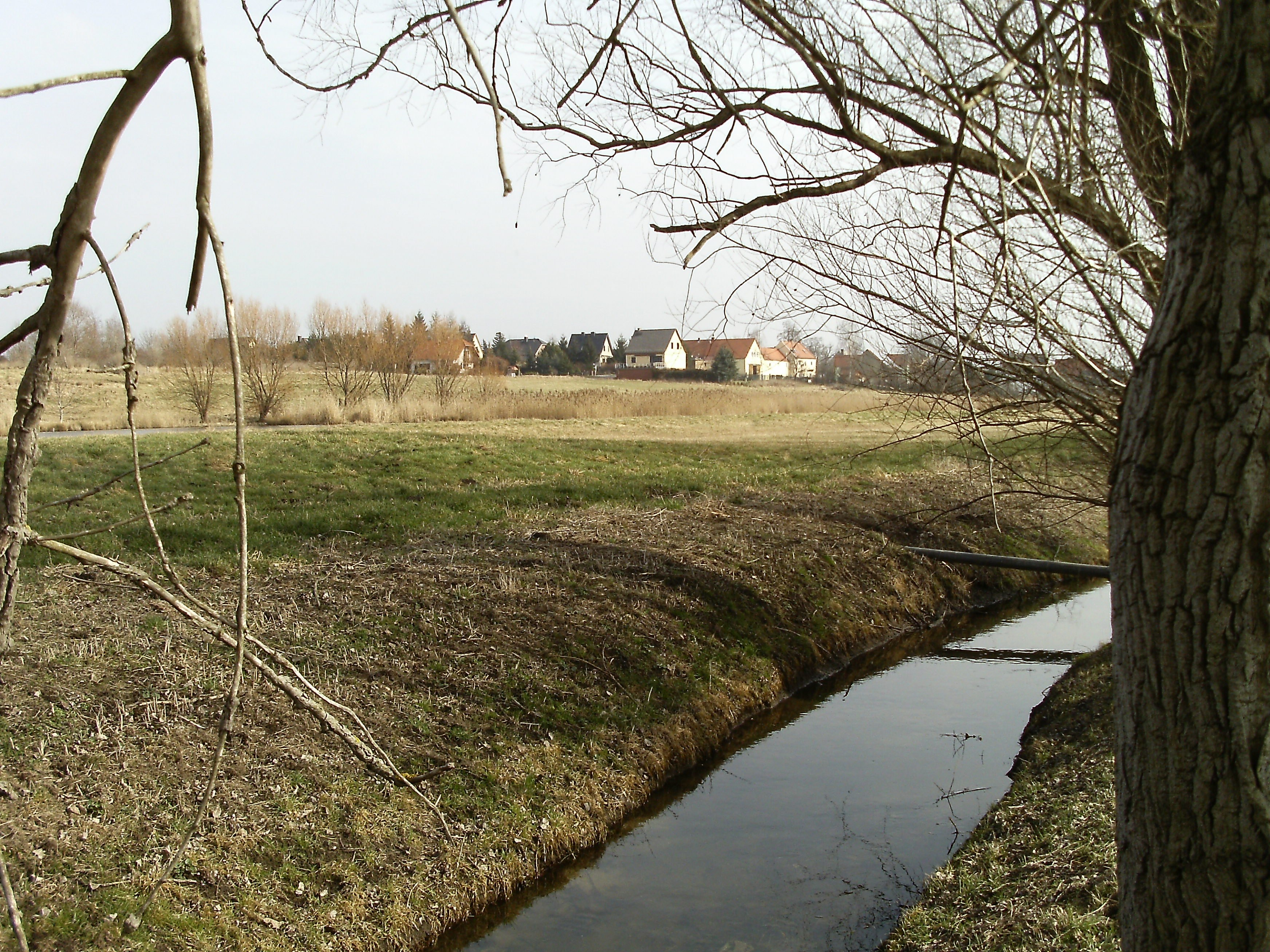

Location
- Country: Germany
- State: Saxony-Anhalt

Physical characteristics
- Mouth
  - location: Saale near Bad Dürrenberg
  - coordinates: 51.2903°N 12.0624°E

Basin features
- Progression: Saale→ Elbe→ North Sea

The Ellerbach is a right tributary of the river Saale. It flows through the districts Burgenlandkreis and Saalekreis of Saxony-Anhalt and flows into the Saale near Bad Dürrenberg.

Places on the Ellerbach are Schweßwitz (a district of Röcken), Ellerbach (a district of Tollwitz), Tollwitz and Bad Dürrenberg.

== See also ==
- List of rivers of Saxony-Anhalt
