= Kriegsdorf =

Kriegsdorf may refer to:

- Hodod, Romania, known in German as Kriegsdorf
- a district of Troisdorf, in North Rhine-Westphalia, Germany
- the pre-war name of Friedensdorf, in Saxony-Anhalt, Germany
- the German name of Dornești, a village that previously had a sizable population of Bukovina Germans, now in Suceava county, Romania
