= Bad Dürrenberg (Verwaltungsgemeinschaft) =

Coordinates: 51.283°N 12.067°E

Bad Dürrenberg was a Verwaltungsgemeinschaft ("collective municipality") in the Saalekreis district, in Saxony-Anhalt, Germany. The seat of the Verwaltungsgemeinschaft was in Bad Dürrenberg.

It was disbanded on 1 January 2010.

The Verwaltungsgemeinschaft Bad Dürrenberg consisted of the following municipalities:

1. Bad Dürrenberg
2. Nempitz
3. Tollwitz
