= Nempitz =

- Stadtteil of Bad Dürrenberg
- Coat of arms
- Interactive map of Nempitz
- Location within Germany Location within Saxony-Anhalt
- Coordinates: 51°18′N 12°9′E
- Country: Germany
- State: Saxony-Anhalt
- District: Saalekreis
- Town: Bad Dürrenberg

Area
  - Total: 6.06 km^{2} (2.34 sq mi)
- Elevation: 114 m (374 ft)

Population (2006-12-31)
  - Total: 307
  - Density: 50.7/km^{2} (131/sq mi)
- Time zone: UTC+01:00 (CET)
  - Summer (DST): UTC+02:00 (CEST)
- Postal codes: 06231
- Dialling codes: 03462

Nempitz is a village and a former municipality in the district Saalekreis, in Saxony-Anhalt, Germany. Since 1 January 2010, it is part of the town Bad Dürrenberg, prior to that it was part of the Verwaltungsgemeinschaft Bad Dürrenberg.
