= Rodden =

- Stadtteil of Leuna
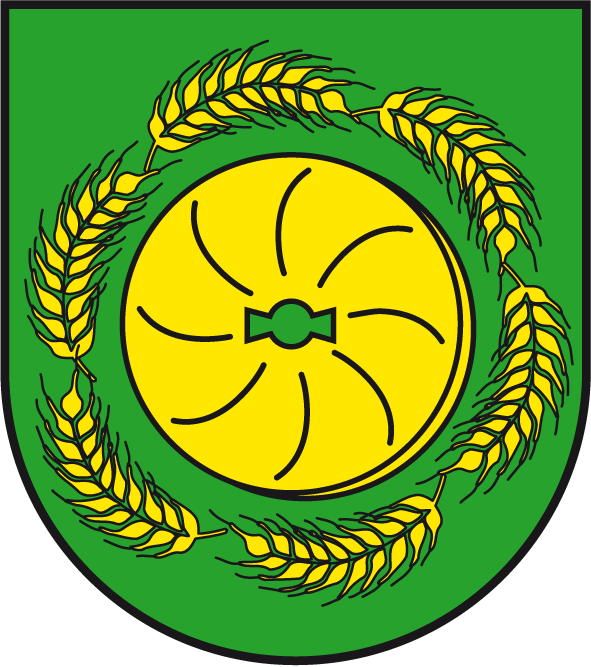
- Coat of arms
- Interactive map of Rodden
- Location within Germany Location within Saxony-Anhalt
- Coordinates: 51°20′N 12°10′E
- Country: Germany
- State: Saxony-Anhalt
- District: Saalekreis
- Town: Leuna

Area
  - Total: 3.61 km^{2} (1.39 sq mi)
- Elevation: 114 m (374 ft)

Population (2006-12-31)
  - Total: 254
  - Density: 70.4/km^{2} (182/sq mi)
- Time zone: UTC+01:00 (CET)
  - Summer (DST): UTC+02:00 (CEST)
- Postal codes: 06231
- Dialling codes: 034638

Rodden (German pronunciation: [ˈʁɔdn̩]) is a village and a former municipality in the district Saalekreis, in Saxony-Anhalt, Germany. Since 31 December 2009, it is part of the town Leuna.
