= Horburg-Maßlau =

- Stadtteil of Leuna
- Coat of arms
- Interactive map of Horburg-Maßlau
- Location within Germany Location within Saxony-Anhalt
- Coordinates: 51°22′N 12°10′E
- Country: Germany
- State: Saxony-Anhalt
- District: Saalekreis
- Town: Leuna

Area
  - Total: 3.97 km^{2} (1.53 sq mi)
- Elevation: 90 m (300 ft)

Population (2006-12-31)
  - Total: 555
  - Density: 140/km^{2} (362/sq mi)
- Time zone: UTC+01:00 (CET)
  - Summer (DST): UTC+02:00 (CEST)
- Postal codes: 06254
- Dialling codes: 034204
- Vehicle registration: SK
- Website: www.horburg-masslau.de

Horburg-Maßlau is a former municipality in the district Saalekreis, in Saxony-Anhalt, Germany. Since 31 December 2009, it is part of the town Leuna.
