= Wolfram Adolphi =

German journalist

Wolfram Adolphi (born 6 January 1951 in Leuna) is a German journalist and political scientist. From 1990 until the 1991 revelation that he had been an informant for the Stasi, he was head of the Berlin chapter of the Party of Democratic Socialism (PDS), which was a forerunner to the current Left Party.

== Life ==
In addition to completing his Abitur, Adolphi earned qualifications as a cattle breeder. From 1971 until 1976, he studied foreign politics at the Institute for International Relations at the German Academy for Law and Political Science (Deutsche Akademie für Staats- und Rechtswissenschaft) in the Babelsberg district of Potsdam. There, in 1976, he successfully defended his thesis "France's Policy on China in the 1970s". From 1976 until 1980 he was a doctoral candidate in political science with an emphasis on Asian politics at the Humboldt University of Berlin (HU). In 1980 he defended a dissertation, "Effects of the Sino-American Relations on Southeast Asia in the 1970s". Following this, he was a correspondent in Japan from 1980 until 1985 for the East German foreign policy-centered weekly newspaper Horizont. In this position, he spied for the Hauptverwaltung Aufklärung, the main foreign espionage service of East Germany and a subset of the Stasi. Between 1985 and 1988 he continued as a political science doctoral candidate. From 1987 to 1988 he lived in China as part of a visiting fellowship at Peking University, and at Di'er lishi dang'anguan, a historical archive, in Nanjing. As an assistant professor in 1988, he took the post of honorary Socialist Unity Party of Germany party secretary at Humboldt University. In 1989, he defended his Promotions B dissertation (an academic distinction in East Germany), which was titled "Chinese Policy in Fascist Germany". In May 1990, he entered the City Council of Berlin for the Party of Democratic Socialism (PDS).

In 1990 he became the first chairperson of the Berlin chapter of the PDS and a member of the State Parliament of Berlin. After parent representatives at his children's school began to suspect him of being affiliated with the Stasi, Adolphi made his work with the former East German secret police force public in June 1991. The state parliament of which he was a member still expressed confidence in him, with 128 votes for and 59 against, but as a result of intra-party pressure, he was forced to resign his position in the parliament on 22 August. His successor, André Brie, had also worked for the Stasi. Also in 1991, he was fired from Humboldt University in Berlin.

Since then, Adolphi has worked as the editor for the magazine "Utopia Creative" (Utopie kreativ), and from November 2003 until October 2005, he worked in Public Relations for the Rosa Luxemburg Foundation. Just as he had from 1999 to 2002, he has worked since 2005 as a research associate for Roland Claus, a member of the Left in the German Parliament.

== Publications ==
- Adolphi, Wolfram: Mao. Eine Chronik, Berlin 2009, ISBN 978-3-355-01763-3.
- Adolphi, Wolfram: Chinatraum, Berlin 2007, ISBN 3-86557-132-8.
- Adolphi, Wolfram: Chinafieber, Roman, Berlin 2004, ISBN 3-86557-012-7.
- Mechthild Leutner (Hg.), Wolfram Adolphi, Peter Merker (Bearb.): Deutschland und China 1937-1949. Politik – Militär – Wirtschaft – Kultur. Eine Quellensammlung. Akademie Verlag, Berlin 1998, ISBN 3-05-002986-2.
- Adolphi, Wolfram/Schütrumpf, Jörn (Hg.): Ernst Thälmann: An Stalin - Briefe aus dem Zuchthaus 1939 bis 1941, Berlin 1996, ISBN 3-320-01927-9.
- Achim Sperling, Roland Felber, Wolfram Adolphi: Die Volksrepublik China 1979–1989. Eine kommentierte Chronik. Dietz, Berlin 1990, ISBN 3-320-01504-4.
- Wolfram Adolphi: Die Chinapolitik des faschistischen Deutschland 1937–1945. Habilitation, Humboldt-Universität zu Berlin, 1989.
- Wolfram Adolphi, Joachim Adolphi: High-Tech im Land der Samurai. Erlebnisse im Umfeld eines "Wirtschaftswunders". Neues Leben, 1988, ISBN 3-355-00598-3.
- Wolfram Adolphi u.a.: China-Westeuropa. Blickpunkt Weltpolitik. Staatsverlag der Deutschen Demokratischen Republik, 1981.
- Wolfram Adolphi: Zur Wirkung des Verhältnisses zwischen der Volksrepublik China und den Vereinigten Staaten von Amerika in Südostasien (1969–1979): Dissertation, Humboldt-Universität zu Berlin, 1980.
