= Halle State Museum of Prehistory =

Museum in Germany

- Landesmuseum für Vorgeschichte Sachsen-Anhalt
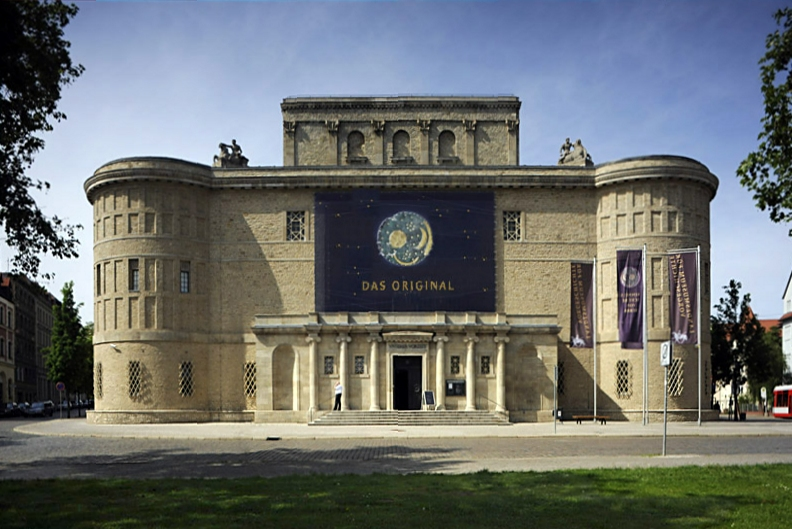

- Location in Germany Halle State Museum of Prehistory (Germany)
- Established: 1819
- Location: Halle, Saxony-Anhalt
- Coordinates: 51°29′54″N 11°57′45″E
- Website: www.landesmuseum-vorgeschichte.de

The State Museum of Prehistory (Landesmuseum für Vorgeschichte) in Halle (Saale) is the archaeological museum of the German state of Saxony-Anhalt.

Founded in Naumburg in 1819, it was moved to Halle in 1825, and within Halle to its present location in 1918.

Its collection, comprising more than 15 million items, is among the most extensive and important in Germany. Among its most famous exhibits are the Nebra sky disk (Unetice culture), which has been part of the permanent exhibition since 2008, the Eulau family graves (Corded Ware culture) and the Hornhausen rider stone (Francia). It also houses the Mesolithic burial of a woman known as the Bad Dürrenberg shaman.

== History ==
The Museum was founded by the Thüringisch-Sächsischer Verein für Erforschung des vaterländischen Alterthums und Erhaltung seiner Denkmale in Naumburg on October 3, 1819. In 1823, the collection was moved to Halle.

== Gallery ==
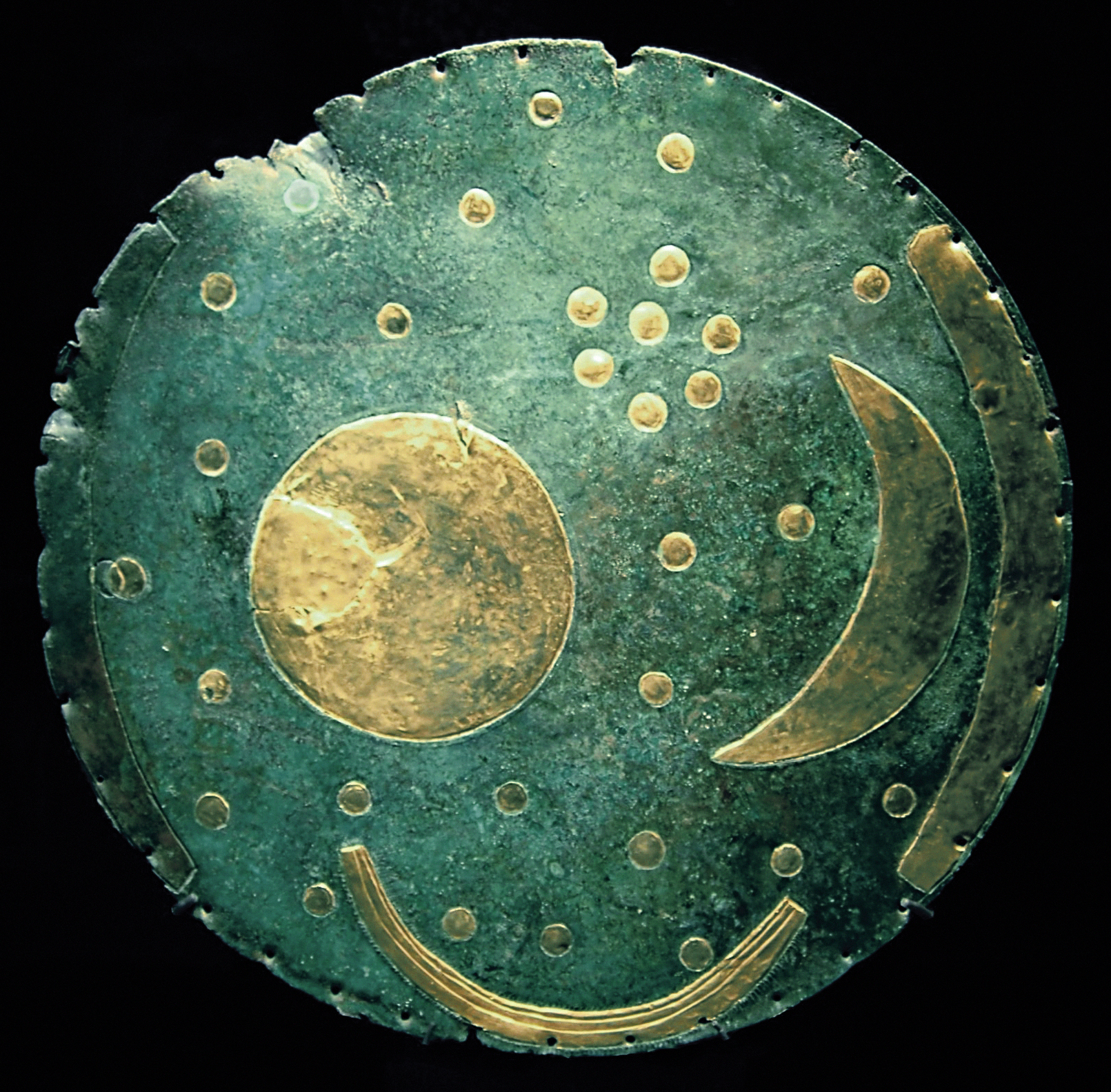
Nebra sky disk

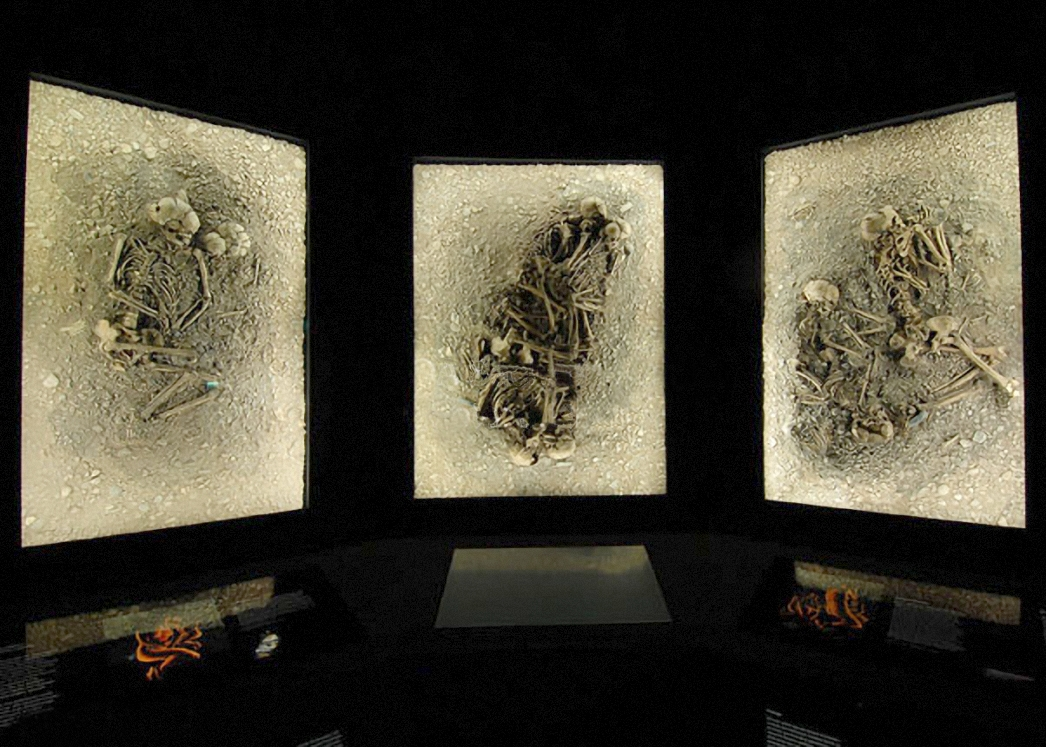
Eulau family graves
