= Global Bioenergies =

- Traded as: Euronext Growth
- Industry: research and development in biotechnology

Global Bioenergies is a French company producing light liquid hydrocarbons derived from agricultural products using biological methods.

== History ==
The company was founded in 2008 by Marc Delcourt and Philippe Marlière.

The pilot plant came on stream in May 2015. The company announced production of one tonne of bio-isobutene from 3.84 tonnes of sugars.

== Locations ==
Created in the Évry Génopole Biocluster in the Essonne department in France, Global Bioenergies operated a demo plant in the ARD (Agro-industrie Recherche et Développements) research and development structure BioDemo pilot in Pomacle-Bazancourt. A pilot for research purposes was constructed at the Fraunhofer Center for Chemical and Biotechnological Processes (Fraunhofer CBP) in Leuna, Germany and is operational since 2016. Global Bioenergies also founded IBN-One, a joint-venture with Cristal Union, to install a plant in France, which should be operational in 2018.

== Products ==
The first process developed is the production of mehtylpropene (also called isobutene or isobutylene) from glucose, according to a process developed in 2010. The bacteria involved in the transformation process carry artificial enzymatic material developed through genetic engineering.

It is the only company in the world to have designed a conversion method for renewable resources (residual sugars, agricultural and forestry waste) into isobutene.

Global Bioenergies subsequently agreed a partnership with Audi to produce fuel from the same elementary building blocks as plants (water, hydrogen, carbon dioxide and day light).
