= Bad Dürrenberg burial =

Mesolithic burial of a female shaman and infant

- Location within Germany
- 51°17′37″N 12°03′048″E
- Type: Double burial
- Periods: Mesolithic c. 7000 to 6800 BC
- Location: Bad Dürrenberg, Saalekreis, Saxony-Anhalt

Site notes
- Excavation dates: 1934, 2019
- Archaeologists: Wilhelm Henning
- Discovered: 4 May 1934

The Bad Dürrenberg burial is a Mesolithic double burial of a woman and baby near the modern town of Bad Dürrenberg, in Saxony-Anhalt, Germany. The grave was discovered on 4 May 1934 by workmen laying a water pipe in a spa garden beside the Saale river. It was excavated in one day under the direction of Wilhelm Henning, a conservator at the Halle State Museum of Prehistory. No photographs were taken of the burial due to time pressure; the only records are written descriptions and sketches which do not record the exact positions of the bodies and objects.

The rectangular grave contained the skeletal remains of an adult woman aged 30–40 years and a 6–8–month–old infant. The woman was buried in a sitting position with bent arms and legs; the baby was probably positioned across her lap. The grave was filled with powdered red ochre and contained many grave goods, including a roe deer antler headdress, 50 pierced teeth from aurochs, deer and wild boar, and stone and bone tools. Radiocarbon dating of human and animal bone yielded a date of 7000–6800 BC, placing the interment in the Mesolithic period. It is displayed in the Halle State Museum of Prehistory in Halle, Germany.

The woman had two incompletely formed vertebrae in her neck and associated malformations of the foramen magnum, the hole through which the spinal cord passes, and related blood vessels. This might have caused neuropathological conditions such as abnormal sensations, uncoordinated limb movements (ataxia), rapid eye movement (nystagmus), or double vision. The woman is thought to have been a shaman; she is often referred to as the Bad Dürrenberg shaman. Genetic analysis revealed she likely had a relatively dark complexion with straight, dark hair and blue eyes. The baby boy she was buried with was found to be a fourth or fifth degree genetic relative with a shared mitochondrial haplogroup; she might have been a direct relative, such as his great-great-grandmother, or she might have been an aunt or cousin several generations removed.

== Discovery ==
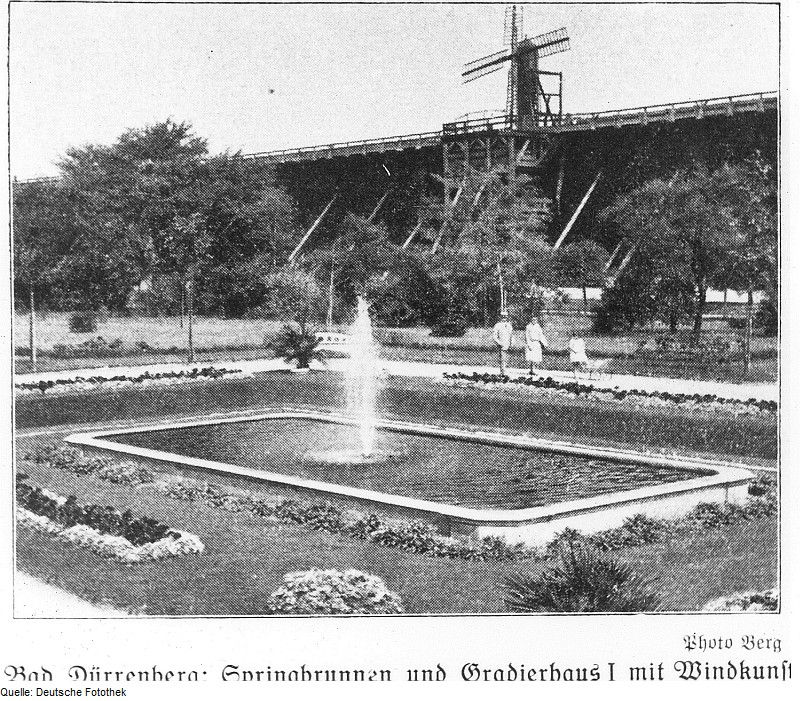
1933 photograph of a fountain in the spa garden at Bad Dürrenberg

The grave is situated on a terrace above the east bank of the River Saale in what is now a spa garden near the modern town of Bad Dürrenberg, 20 kilometres (12 mi) south of Halle in Saxony-Anhalt, Germany. The burial does not appear to be associated with a prehistoric camp; it is possible there was one closer to the river which has since eroded away.

On 4 May 1934, workmen discovered the burial while digging a trench for a fountain water pipe. A local teacher was alerted to the find, who in turn contacted Wilhelm Henning, a conservator at the Halle State Museum of Prehistory. Artefacts were removed from the grave before Henning's arrival so it is unclear exactly how the bodies and grave goods were arranged. The grave was excavated in a single day as the gardens were scheduled to reopen the following day; no photographs were taken due to time pressure. Re-excavation of the site in 2019 found the burial was recovered using only the trench cut for the water pipe. The only records of the excavation are a two-page report and a sketch of the plan and profile elevations. The burial is displayed in the Halle State Museum of Prehistory.

== Description ==
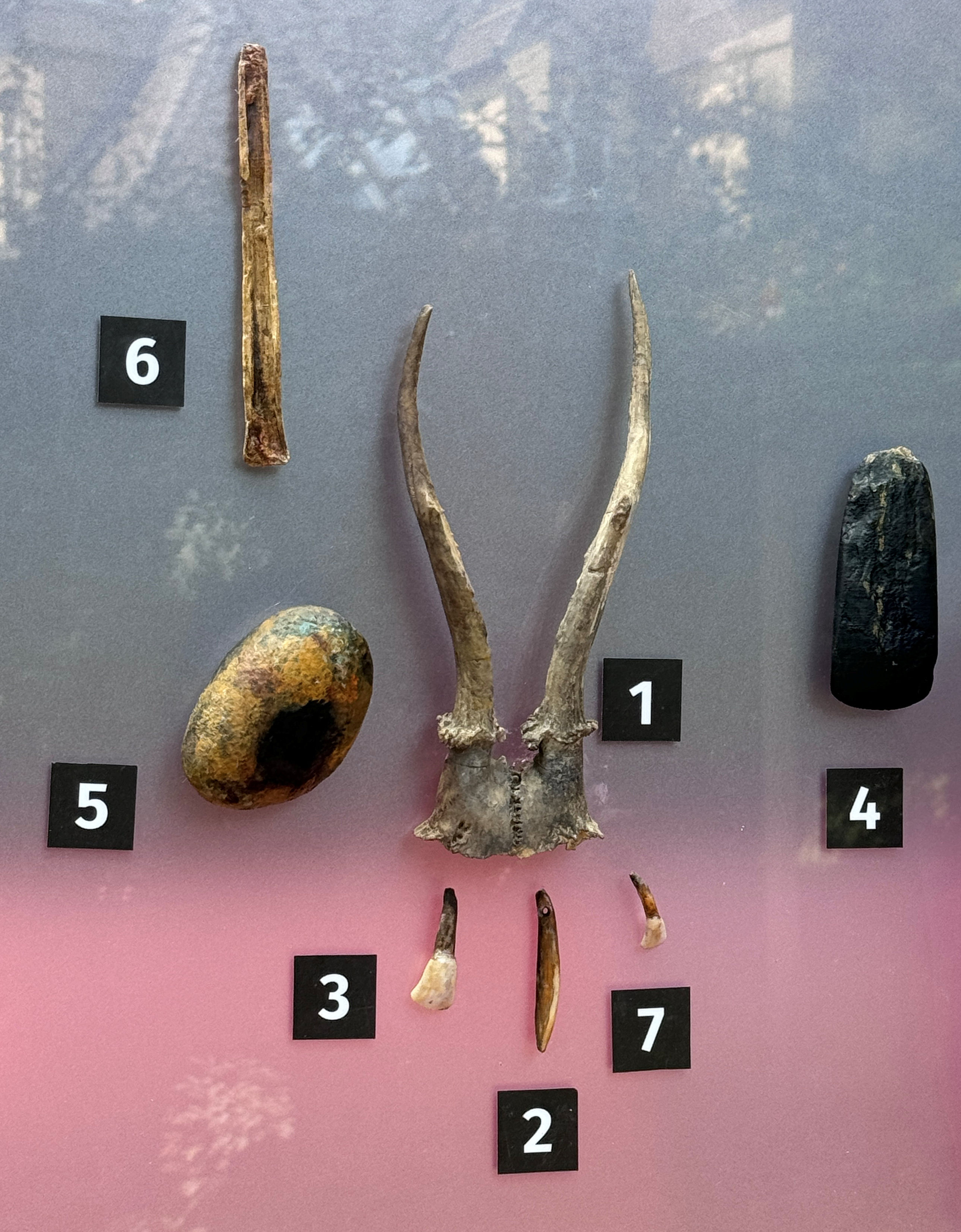
Selection of burial goods from the grave 1: Roe deer headdress; 2-3, 7: Pierced animal teeth; 4: Stone axe blade; 5: Turtle shell; 6: Bone spatula

From the original excavation, it was known the grave was oriented east-northeast west-southwest and was roughly rectangular, measuring 90 by 55 centimetres (2.95 ft × 1.80 ft) with a maximum depth of 1.46 m (4.8 ft). The area where the burial was found was scheduled for redevelopment for the 2022 State Garden Show, so in 2019 the grave was located and entirely removed in two blocks for controlled excavation in a laboratory.

The upper part of the grave was trough-shaped. The lower part was a rectangular shaft measuring 90 by 55 centimetres (2.95 ft × 1.80 ft), whose vertical walls were lined with lattice or wattle. The grave contained the seated body of an adult woman, facing south, and positioned with her legs drawn up and her arms resting on her thighs; an infant was placed in her lap, across her arms. The soil around the bodies was filled with red ochre. After the burial, the shaft was closed with wood and sealed with loam before the upper part was filled.

The burial is exceptional among contemporary burials from Germany for its many grave goods. The pair were interred with stone tools, including a polished axe blade made of amphibolite placed by the woman's right arm, and 31 microlith blades stored in a container made from a crane humerus. Two shaped pebbles and a hammerstone with signs of use and red ochre were also placed in the grave. Over 140 animal teeth and bones were recovered, some of which were likely ornaments. The antlers of a two-year-old roe deer buck show signs of skinning and manipulation, indicating they might have been part of a headdress. Soil samples from near her head identified fragments of goose feathers, suggesting the headdress was also feathered. There were 50 incisor teeth from aurochs, steppe bison, wild boar, red and roe deer, many of which were pierced for wear; a further six were split boar tusks, two of which were pierced. Others might have been tools, such as a spatula with traces of red ochre, and awls made from deer leg bones. Other items are thought to be purely grave goods, consisting of jaws and scapulae of roe deer, three cleaned shells of European pond turtles, 120 fragments of freshwater mussel shells and isolated elements of a beaver and hedgehog. Pollen from meadowsweet, mullein, buttercup, and devil's bit scabious or scabiosa was found in the soil from around her head, representing pollen trapped in her hair or flowers placed in the grave; their flowering times suggest she might have been buried in July. Pollen from medicinal plants such as birch, buckthorn, hops, and lady's mantle was also present.

== Occupants ==
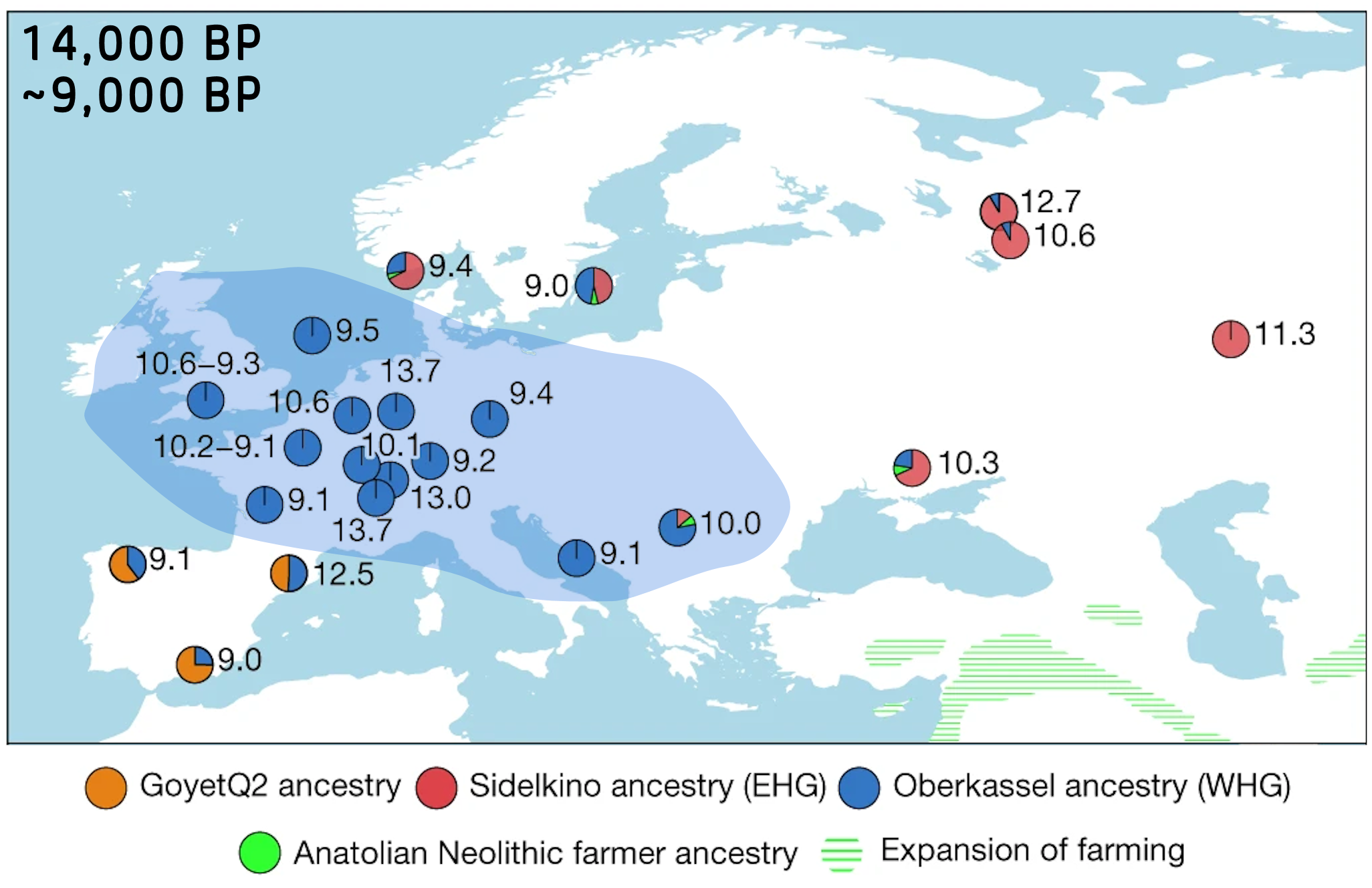
Genetic ancestry of hunter-gatherers dated between 14 ka and 9 ka (Western hunter-gatherers (WHG) highlighted)

Initially, it was thought the grave belonged to a Neolithic man based on the presence of a polished stone axe and blades and biological anthropologist G. Heberer's study of the skull, which he assigned to a mature male; this was later worked into Nazi propaganda, with the burial cast as an Aryan. Reexamination of the skeleton in the 1950s and 1990s determined the individual was female. Radiocarbon dating, first conducted on the woman's skeleton in the 1970s, confirmed she lived around 9,000 years ago, 7000–6800 BC, during the Mesolithic.

The adult skeleton was well preserved and recovered largely complete in 1934; additional smaller bones from the hands, feet and spine were found during the re-excavation of the grave. The woman died between the ages of 30 and 40 years. Her height in life is estimated to have been 155 cm (5 ft 1 in). Her face had broad cheekbones and robust features, with a slender build. Genetic analysis revealed she likely had a dark complexion with straight dark hair and blue eyes, a common combination among the European population at the time and shared by other Mesolithic individuals such as the Loschbour man and the Cheddar Man. Study of her mitochondrial DNA found she had the haplogroup U4, typical of the Mesolithic; her specific subclade was U4b1b1. Her bones lack strong muscle attachments, indicating she was less active than expected for the time period. Signs of wear to the vertebrae in her lower back and torso combined with facets on her leg bones indicate she spent a lot of time kneeling. Her health seems to have been good, with no signs of arrested growth (Harris lines). Her two upper front teeth were worn, exposing the pulp cavity. This might have been caused by holding objects such as hides between the teeth but this wear lacks the curve associated with the processing of leather. The lack of secondary dentin formation indicates the wear happened quickly. Harald Meller, director of the Halle State Museum of Prehistory, suggests her teeth were deliberately filed as part of a ritual. The open pulp cavities led to infection in one of the teeth and the formation of an abscess that spread to the maxillary sinus. Martin Porr and Kurt Alt suggest this was the cause of her death.

The woman had incompletely formed atlas and axis vertebrae (the two highest vertebrae in the neck), which are missing large portions of their posterior arches, and had associated malformations of the foramen magnum (hole in the base of the skull). In the 1950s, H. Grimm suggested the atypical appearance of the foramen magnum was due to decapitation but there is no evidence of cut marks. She might have been able to block blood vessels to the brain by holding her head in certain positions. This might have caused a variety of neuropathological conditions such as itching, burning or crawling sensations, uncoordinated movements (ataxia), rapid eye movement (nystagmus), or caused double vision. It is possible that, if she did exhibit these conditions, she might have been seen as having access to supernatural abilities. Her possible physical abilities, combined with her elaborate burial and the presence of a roe deer headdress with antlers, has led to the suggestion she was a shaman; for this reason she is often referred to as the "Bad Dürrenberg shaman". Around 6400 BC, approximately 600 years after her death, a pair of antler headdresses with feather and plant fibre decoration were buried about 90 cm (3.0 ft) from her grave, suggesting she was remembered and revered centuries later.

The baby was 6–8 months old at death. The skeleton is largely fragmentary and incomplete. X-rays found no evidence of health issues but reexamination found signs of vitamin deficiency. Genetic analysis identified the infant as male. Testing found he was a fourth or fifth-degree genetic relative of the woman, with a shared mitochondrial haplogroup. She might have been a direct relative, such as his great-great-grandmother (in which case they were buried at different times), or she might have been an aunt or cousin several generations removed (which allows for them living contemporaneously). Previously, the baby was assumed to be her child.

Isolated vertebrae from two other children were present in the grave, and genetic analysis confirmed they were both male. One individual was the twin brother of the infant interred, the other was a relative.

== In popular culture ==
The reconstruction of the shaman in her full regalia by artist Karol Schauer for the Halle State Museum of Prehistory appears to have been the inspiration for the headdress of the female shaman portrayed by Leonor Varela in the 2018 film Alpha.
