= Spergau =

- Stadtteil of Leuna
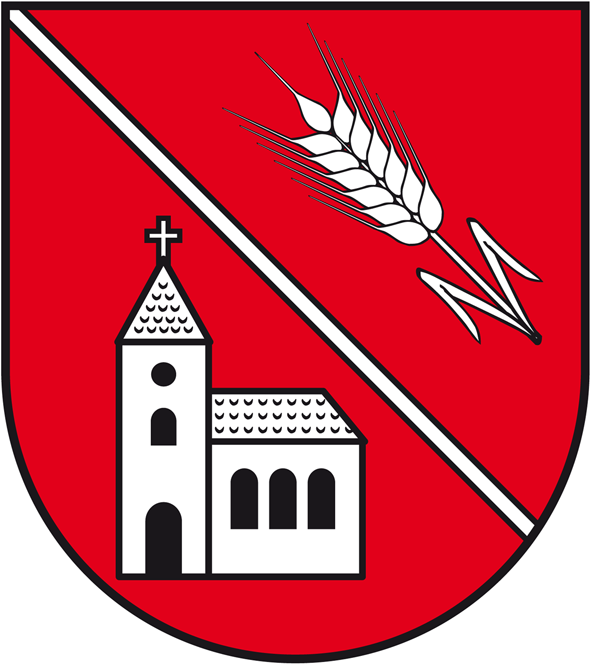
- Coat of arms
- Interactive map of Spergau
- Location within Germany Location within Saxony-Anhalt
- Coordinates: 51°18′N 12°2′E
- Country: Germany
- State: Saxony-Anhalt
- District: Saalekreis
- Town: Leuna

Area
  - Total: 10.80 km^{2} (4.17 sq mi)
- Elevation: 88 m (289 ft)

Population (2006-12-31)
  - Total: 1,097
  - Density: 101.6/km^{2} (263.1/sq mi)
- Time zone: UTC+01:00 (CET)
  - Summer (DST): UTC+02:00 (CEST)
- Postal codes: 06237
- Dialling codes: 034446
- Website: www.gemeinde-spergau.de

Spergau is a village and a former municipality in the district Saalekreis, in Saxony-Anhalt, Germany. Since 31 December 2009, it is part of the town Leuna.
