= Zweimen =

- Stadtteil of Leuna
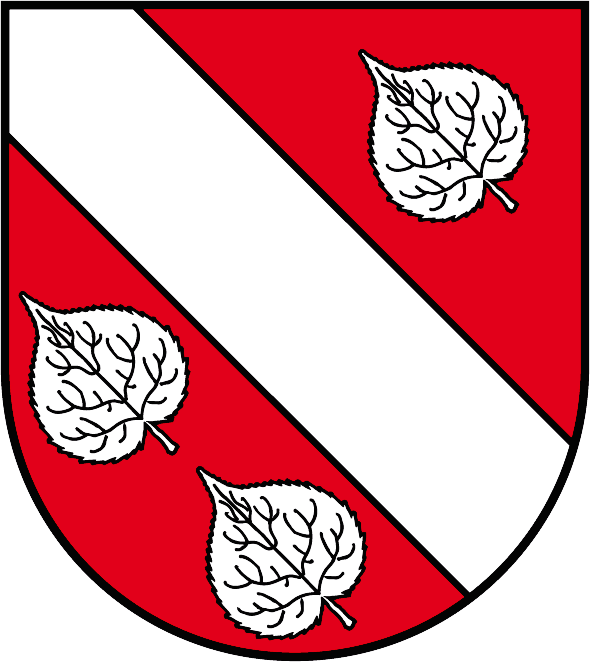
- Coat of arms
- Interactive map of Zweimen
- Location within Germany Location within Saxony-Anhalt
- Coordinates: 51°22′N 12°9′E
- Country: Germany
- State: Saxony-Anhalt
- District: Saalekreis
- Town: Leuna

Area
  - Total: 7.31 km^{2} (2.82 sq mi)
- Elevation: 91 m (299 ft)

Population (2006-12-31)
  - Total: 323
  - Density: 44.2/km^{2} (114/sq mi)
- Time zone: UTC+01:00 (CET)
  - Summer (DST): UTC+02:00 (CEST)
- Postal codes: 06254
- Dialling codes: 034638

Zweimen (German pronunciation: [ˈtsvaɪmən]) is a village and a former municipality in the district Saalekreis, in Saxony-Anhalt, Germany. Since 31 December 2009, it is part of the town Leuna.
