= Schkopau Power Station =

Coal-burning power plant in Germany

Coordinates: 51°23′54.44″N 11°57′1.17″E

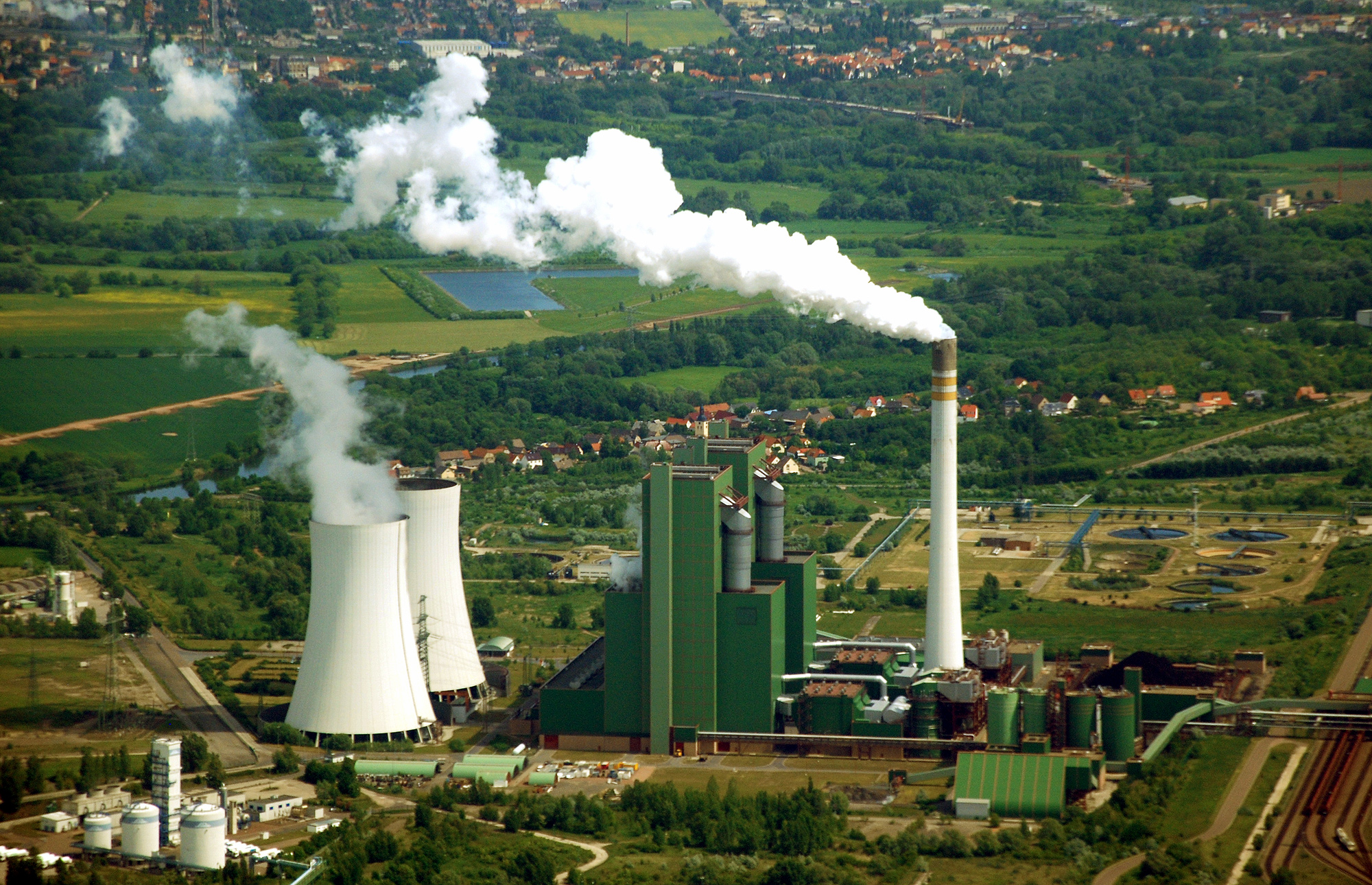
Schkopau Power Station in 2009

The Schkopau Power Station is a 900 MW lignite-fuelled power station near the Korbetha part of the municipality of Schkopau in the district of Merseburg-Querfurt (Saxony-Anhalt), Germany, which was built in 1995/1996. It has two units with a total capacity of 900 megawatts (MW), of which are 110 MW for traction current with a frequency of 16.7 cycles per second produced in a dedicated generator for Deutsche Bahn AG. In addition, heat is provided for local chemical factories through cogeneration. The power station has a 200 metres (656 ft) high chimney. It is owned and operated by Uniper and EP Energy. The closure is planned for 2034.

== See also ==
- Buna Werke Schkopau - Major polymer production site during World War II and Cold War.
- Profen coal mine - Provides lignite for the Schkopau Power Station.
- Middle German Chemical Triangle - Area around Leuna, Buna and Bitterfeld.
