= Günthersdorf =

- Stadtteil of Leuna
- Coat of arms
- Interactive map of Günthersdorf
- Location within Germany Location within Saxony-Anhalt
- Coordinates: 51°21′N 12°10′E
- Country: Germany
- State: Saxony-Anhalt
- District: Saalekreis
- Town: Leuna

Area
  - Total: 3.26 km^{2} (1.26 sq mi)
- Elevation: 109 m (358 ft)

Population (2008-12-31)
  - Total: 1,245
  - Density: 382/km^{2} (989/sq mi)
- Time zone: UTC+01:00 (CET)
  - Summer (DST): UTC+02:00 (CEST)
- Postal codes: 06237
- Dialling codes: 034638

Günthersdorf (German pronunciation: [ˈɡʏntɐsdɔʁf]) is a village and a former municipality in the district Saalekreis, in Saxony-Anhalt, Germany. Since 31 December 2009, it is part of the town Leuna.

== Economy ==
The town is the site of a large shopping mall and an IKEA furniture store.
