= Wallendorf (Luppe) =

- Ortsteil of Schkopau
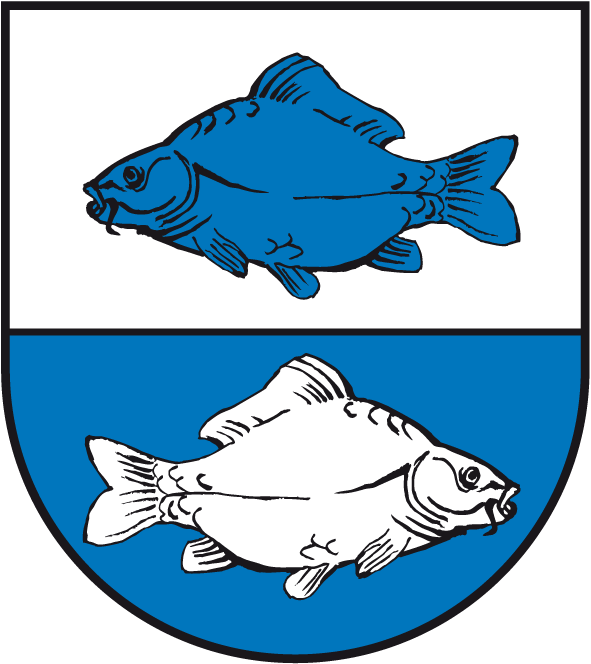
- Coat of arms
- Interactive map of Wallendorf (Luppe)
- Location within Germany Location within Saxony-Anhalt
- Coordinates: 51°21′31″N 12°4′47″E
- Country: Germany
- State: Saxony-Anhalt
- District: Saalekreis
- Municipality: Schkopau

Area
  - Total: 9.06 km^{2} (3.50 sq mi)
- Elevation: 87 m (285 ft)

Population (2008-12-31)
  - Total: 793
  - Density: 87.5/km^{2} (227/sq mi)
- Time zone: UTC+01:00 (CET)
  - Summer (DST): UTC+02:00 (CEST)
- Postal codes: 06254
- Dialling codes: 034639

Wallendorf (Luppe) (German pronunciation: [ˈvaləndɔʁf]) is a village and a former municipality in the Saalekreis district, Saxony-Anhalt, Germany.

Since 1 January 2010, it is part of the municipality Schkopau.
