= Tollwitz =

- Stadtteil of Bad Dürrenberg
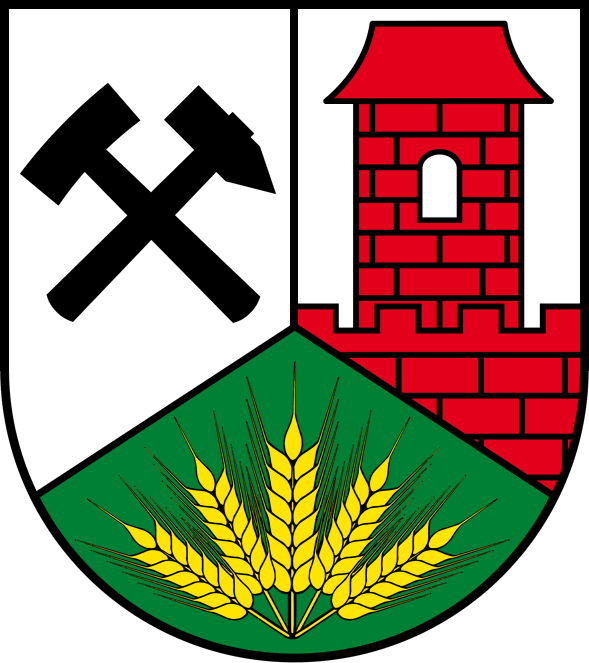
- Coat of arms
- Interactive map of Tollwitz
- Location within Germany Location within Saxony-Anhalt
- Coordinates: 51°17′N 12°6′E
- Country: Germany
- State: Saxony-Anhalt
- District: Saalekreis
- Town: Bad Dürrenberg

Area
  - Total: 10.92 km^{2} (4.22 sq mi)
- Elevation: 102 m (335 ft)

Population (2006-12-31)
  - Total: 1,218
  - Density: 111.5/km^{2} (288.9/sq mi)
- Time zone: UTC+01:00 (CET)
  - Summer (DST): UTC+02:00 (CEST)
- Postal codes: 06231
- Dialling codes: 03462
- Website: www.gemeinde-tollwitz.de

Tollwitz is a village and a former municipality in the district Saalekreis, in Saxony-Anhalt, Germany. Since 1 January 2010, it is part of the town Bad Dürrenberg, prior to that it was part of the Verwaltungsgemeinschaft Bad Dürrenberg.
