= Friedensdorf =

- Ortsteil of Leuna
- Coat of arms
- Interactive map of Friedensdorf
- Location within Germany Location within Saxony-Anhalt
- Coordinates: 51°21′N 12°4′E
- Country: Germany
- State: Saxony-Anhalt
- District: Saalekreis
- Town: Leuna

Area
  - Total: 3.29 km^{2} (1.27 sq mi)
- Elevation: 165 m (541 ft)

Population (2006-12-31)
  - Total: 325
  - Density: 98.8/km^{2} (256/sq mi)
- Time zone: UTC+01:00 (CET)
  - Summer (DST): UTC+02:00 (CEST)
- Postal codes: 06254
- Dialling codes: 034639

Friedensdorf (German pronunciation: [ˈfʁiːdn̩sdɔʁf]) is a village and a former municipality in the Saalekreis district, Saxony-Anhalt, Germany. Since 31 December 2009, it is part of the town Leuna.
