= Leuna =

- Town
- Coat of arms

- Location of Leuna within Saalekreis district
- Interactive map of Leuna
- Location within Germany Location within Saxony-Anhalt
- Coordinates: 51°19′N 12°01′E
- Country: Germany
- State: Saxony-Anhalt
- District: Saalekreis
- Subdivisions: 5

Government
  - Mayor (2022–29): Michael Bedla (CDU)

Area
  - Total: 87.71 km^{2} (33.87 sq mi)
- Elevation: 99 m (325 ft)

Population (2025-12-31)
  - Total: 14,013
  - Density: 159.8/km^{2} (413.8/sq mi)
- Time zone: UTC+01:00 (CET)
  - Summer (DST): UTC+02:00 (CEST)
- Postal codes: 06237
- Dialling codes: 03461
- Vehicle registration: SK
- Website: www.leuna-stadt.de

Leuna (German pronunciation: [ˈlɔʏna]) is a town in Saxony-Anhalt, eastern Germany, south of Merseburg and Halle, on the river Saale.

The town is known for the Leunawerke, at 13 km^{2} one of the biggest chemical industrial complexes in Germany, where a very wide range of chemicals and plastics is produced.

In 1960, Leuna's population was nearly 10,000, but after reunification high unemployment rates and poor living conditions, including pollution from nearby industries, caused significant outward migration. Before the 31 December 2009 incorporation of ten neighbouring municipalities, its population had declined to 6,670.

== Geography ==
The town Leuna consists of Leuna proper and the following 10 Ortschaften or municipal divisions:

- Friedensdorf
- Günthersdorf
- Horburg-Maßlau
- Kötschlitz
- Kötzschau
- Kreypau
- Rodden
- Spergau
- Zöschen
- Zweimen

== Economy ==
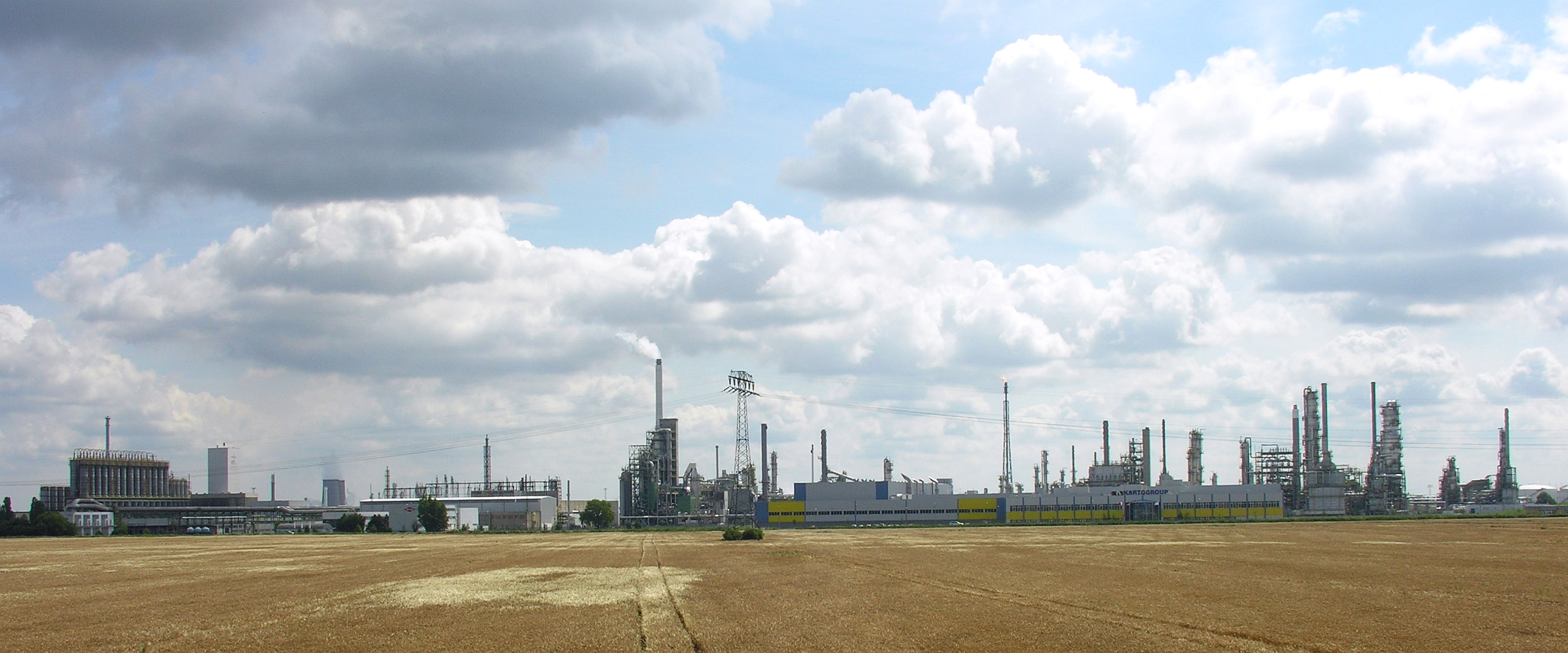
Leuna Chemical and industrial neighborhood (2007)

Leuna's industrial site stretches over 13 km², making it one of the largest chemical industry sites in Germany in terms of geographical area. At the beginning of the 21st century, a wide range of chemical products and plastics are made there. A pilot plant to produce isobutylene from vegetal stock is being built by the French company Global Bioenergies and was expected to start during 2016.

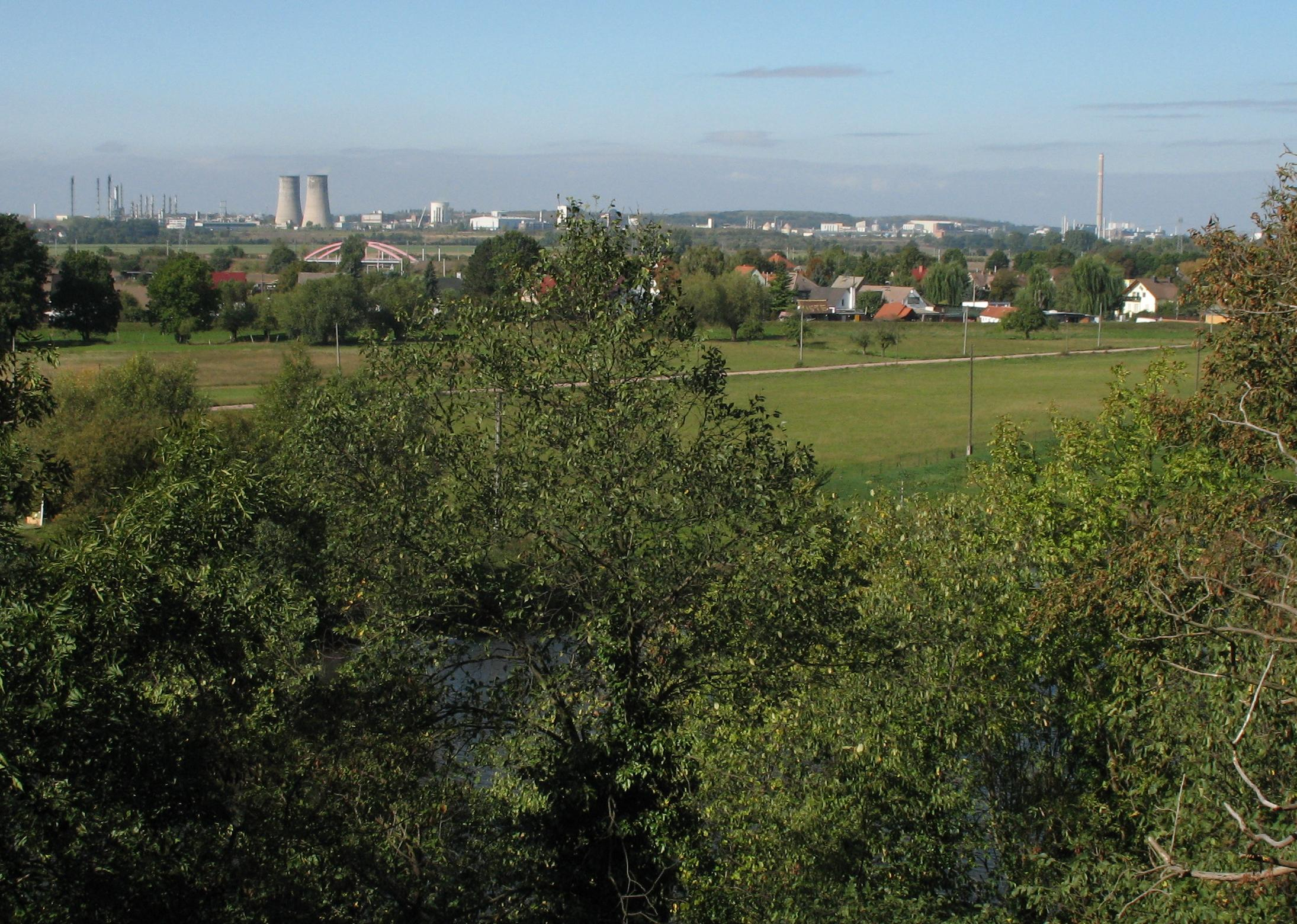
View from Bad Dürrenberg

== Notable people ==
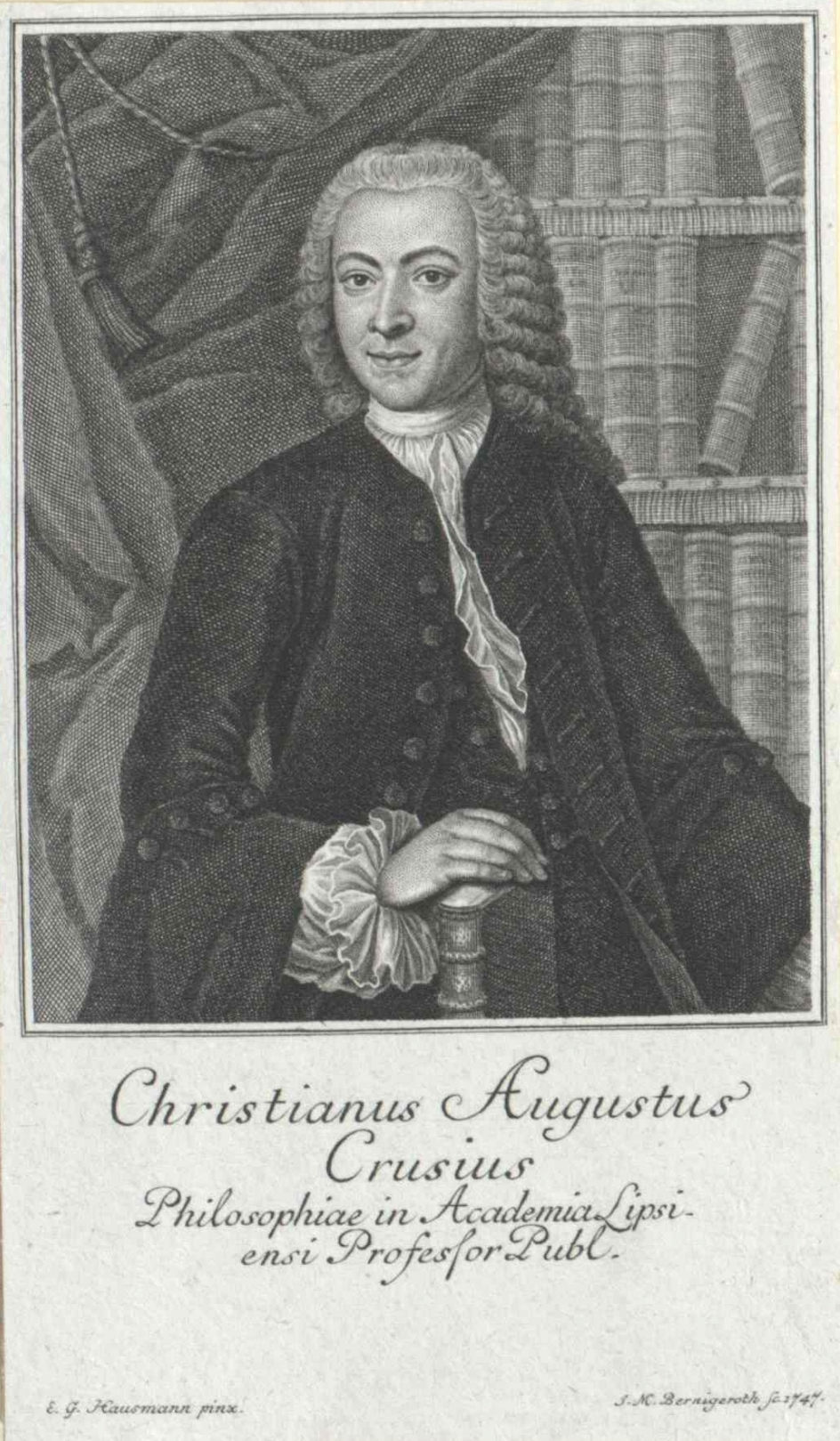
Christian August Crusius in 1747

- Christian August Crusius (1715–1775), philosopher and evangelical theologian
- Wolfram Adolphi (born 1951), journalist and political scientist
