= Bad Dürrenberg =

- Town
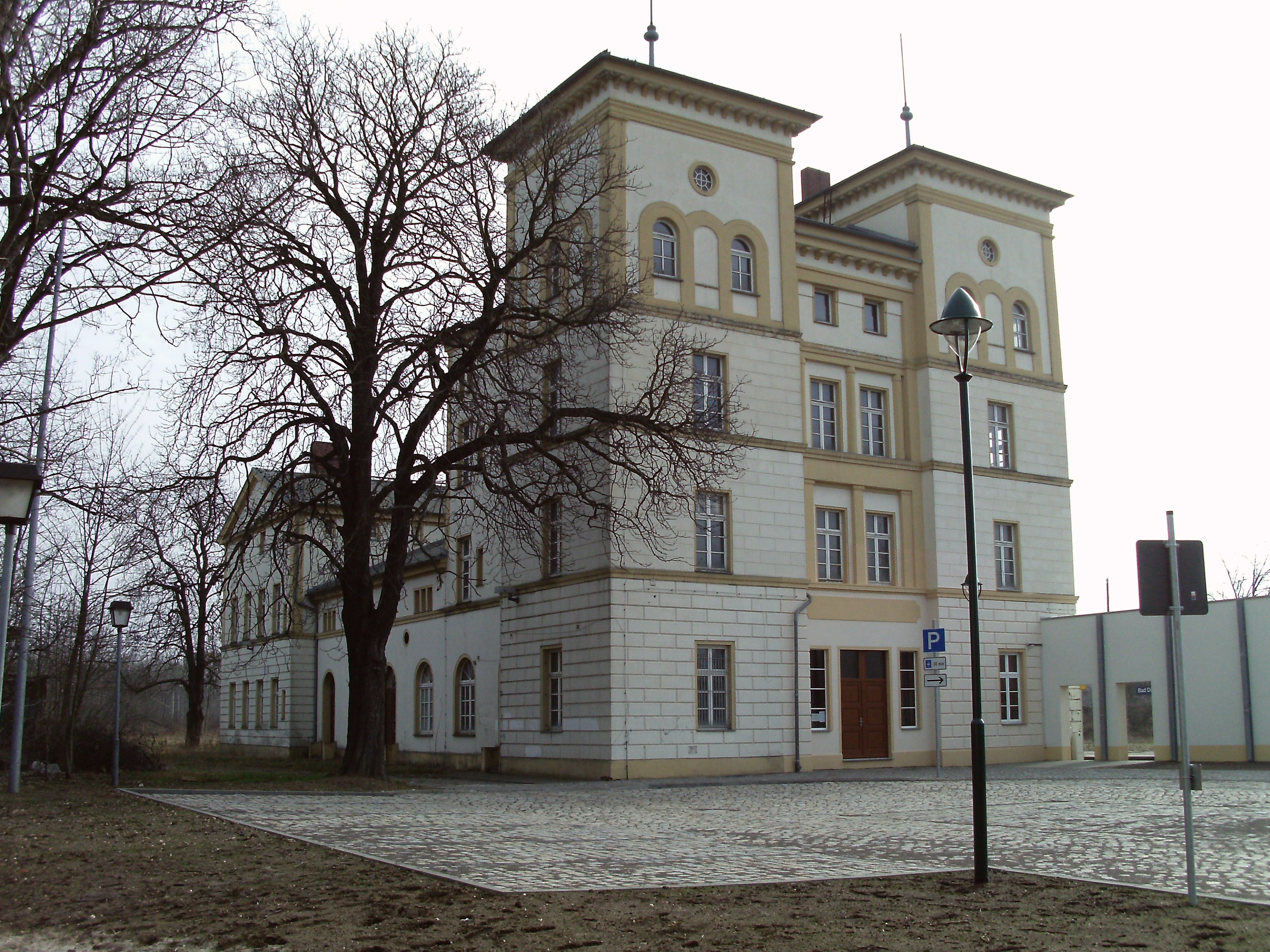
- Train station

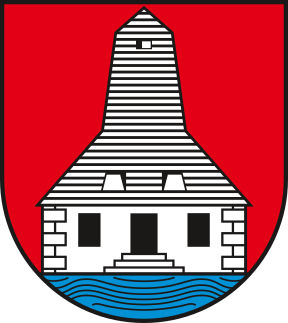
- Coat of arms

- Location of Bad Dürrenberg within Saalekreis district
- Interactive map of Bad Dürrenberg
- Location within Germany Location within Saxony-Anhalt
- Coordinates: 51°17′N 12°4′E
- Country: Germany
- State: Saxony-Anhalt
- District: Saalekreis

Government
  - Mayor (2022–29): Christoph Schulze (CDU)

Area
  - Total: 36.13 km^{2} (13.95 sq mi)
- Elevation: 104 m (341 ft)

Population (2025-12-31)
  - Total: 11,458
  - Density: 317.1/km^{2} (821.4/sq mi)
- Time zone: UTC+01:00 (CET)
  - Summer (DST): UTC+02:00 (CEST)
- Postal codes: 06231
- Dialling codes: 03462
- Vehicle registration: SK
- Website: www.stadt-bad-duerrenberg.de

Bad Dürrenberg is a spa town in the Saalekreis district, in Saxony-Anhalt, Germany. It is situated on the river Saale, approx. 8 km southeast of Merseburg. It is known for its historic graduation tower (for extracting salt from brine), the largest one in Germany.

== Geography ==
The town of Bad Dürrenberg is located on the river Saale between the cities of Leipzig, Merseburg and Weißenfels. In the south of the town, the Ellerbach river flows into the Saale from the east.

=== Neighboring districts ===
The neighboring districts are Leuna to the north, Markranstädt in (Leipzig district) to the east, Lützen (Burgenlandkreis) to the south and, to the west, Weißenfels (Burgenlandkreis).

=== Town and hinterland ===
The following table shows the population of the town itself and those of the municipal divisions (Ortschaften) which were formerly independent municipalities. Oebles-Schlechtewitz was absorbed into Bad Dürrenberg in 2008, and Nempitz and Tollwitz in 2010.

Town	Population	Areas
Bad Dürrenberg	10,805	Bad Dürrenberg, Balditz, Goddula, Keuschberg, Kirchfährendorf, Lennewitz, Ostrau and Vesta
Nempitz	293	Nempitz
Oebles-Schlechtewitz	209	Oebles-Schlechtewitz
Tollwitz	1,175	Ellerbach, Kauern, Ragwitz, Teuditz, Tollwitz and Zöllschen

== History ==
=== Late stone age to early 1700s ===
The area has been populated since Mesolithic times. The elaborate Mesolithic burial of a woman and baby dating to 7000-6800 BC was discovered in 1934 in a riverside spa garden. The woman is thought to have been a shaman.

By 993, the oldest part of the town, the Keuschberg district, was occupied by Otto III, Holy Roman Emperor. Documentary evidence exists from 1197 for a fortified royal court.

From 1656 to 1738, the area of the town was part of the Bishopric of Merseburg, in turn part of the Secondary Principality of Saxony-Merseburg.

=== Mid 1700s: Salt production ===
In 1741, Johann Gottfried Borlach began drilling for brine near Keuschberg. In 1763, he was successful; since then there has been a constant flow of brine with a salt content of nearly 11%. In 1765, a massive brine pumping tower, named after Borlach, was built above the first brine spring. Nearby graduation towers were constructed. The brine pumping tower now operates as a museum, honoring Borlach's achievements and documenting the history of salt production, the processing of Dürrenberg brine into evaporated table salt, and the development of Dürrenberg into a spa town

=== 1800s: Prussian era ===
In 1815, the twelve towns of today's Bad Dürrenberg became part of the German state of Prussia. In 1816, the towns were assigned to the Merseburg administrative district of the province of Saxony.

In 1836, a 4.5 kilometer long Tollwitz-Dürrenberg railway with a gauge of 585 mm and the first 133 m long railway tunnel in Germany was built. On 22 March 1856 a railway line from Leipzig to Corbetha via Barneck, Markranstädt, Kötschau and Dürrenberg began operations.

The first bathhouse was built in 1845 and the first Saale bridge was built in 1920. In the same year, the Rössen tram route was extended in stages via Daspig and Spergau to Fährdorf, and six years later to Bad Dürrenberg train station.

=== 20th century ===
During the times of the Weimar Republic, Dürrenberg was adversised as a spa town, with reference to the existing graduation towers (then 1,821 m long) for bathers to “stay in dust-free, ozone-rich air soaked in salt” and described the health resort as a “brine bath”.

In 1930, the Greater Municipality Dürrenberg was created through the merger of the rural communities Dürrenberg, Keuschberg, Porbitz-Poppitz, Ostrau, Lennewitz and Balditz. Dürrenberg has been called Bad Dürrenberg since it was awarded the title "Bad" (spa) in 1935.

During the Second World War, foreign forced laborers were employed by companies in Bad Dürrenberg.

On 30 November 1946 the municipality of Bad Dürrenberg was granted town charter. The district president Otto Gotsche made the announcement at a ceremonial meeting of the city council on 6 January 1946. The certificate was handed over to Mayor Paul Drese. On 15 April 1947 the city was given its coat of arms, which is still used today; it features the brine-pumping tower.

Beginning in 1950, towns including Kirchfährendorf, Goddula-Vesta, Oebles-Schlechtewitz, Tollwitz, Spergau, and Nempitz were incorporated into the Bad Dürrenberg administrative community.

The production of evaporated salt was discontinued in 1963. Bathing operations were discontinued in 1964.

=== 21st century ===
A new brine well was put into operation on 24 June 2000. In 2003, the former drinking hall in the spa gardens was renovated and then reopened for brine applications. In 2008 the city was awarded the title of "state-recognized resort".

== Events and festivals ==
Each year on the last weekend of June the town has a festival held over a period of three days, which is known as Brunnenfest (Well Celebration).

== Population development ==
Historical population (as of 31 December unless otherwise noted). Values since 2010 also include neighboring villages which were annexed by the town.

Year	Inhabitants
1990	13,008^{1}
1995	12,214
2000	11,902
2005	11,391
2006	11,287
2012	11,844
2015	11,763
30 June 2016	11,931

^{1} 3 October

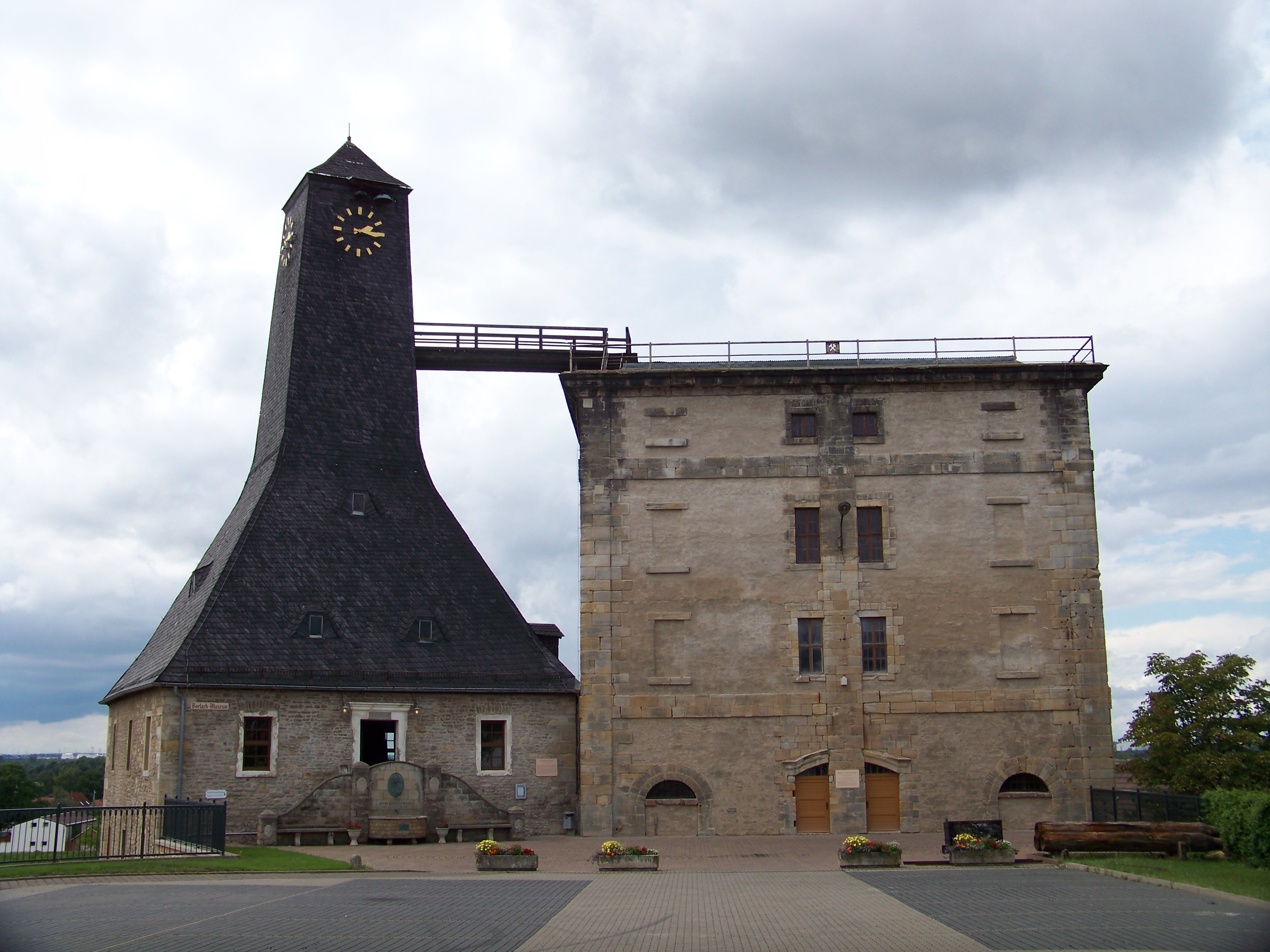
Bad Dürrenberg Borlach museum

== Mayors ==
- Kurt Eckart (SPD), May–June 1945
- Karl Herfurth (KPD), July 1945 – 1946
- Paul Drese (SED), 1946-1947
- Fritz Singer, 1948-1952
- Kurt Boose, from 1951 (deputy)
- Gerry Chisel (SED), from 1952 acting / Edmund Jatz
- Martha Wessler (SED), 1953-1976
- Liselotte Wehowski (SED), 1976-1986
- Frank Klappach (SED), 1986-1988
- Karin Zeisler (SED), 1988-1990
- Thomas Heilmann (CDU), 1990-2001
- Jürgen Elste (FDP), 2001-2008
- Árpád Nemes (CDU), 2008-2015
- Christoph Schulze (CDU), since 2015

== Personality ==
=== Sons and daughters of the town ===
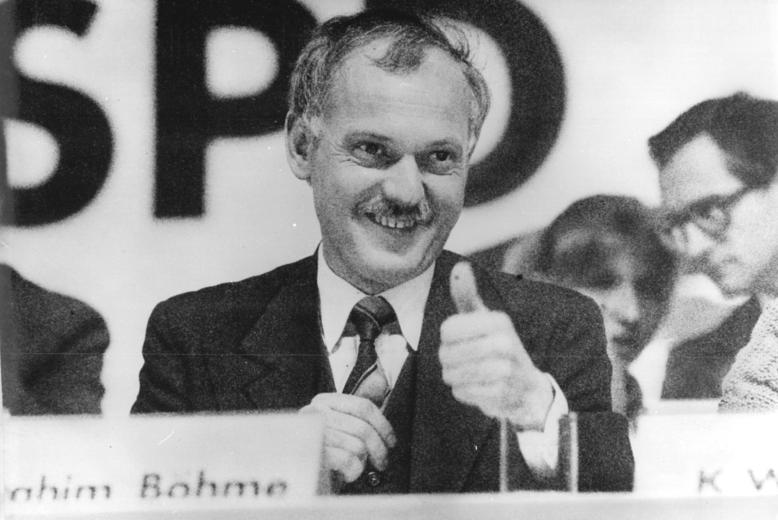
SPD-Party convent 1990, Ibrahim Böhme

- Ibrahim Böhme (1944–1999), politician
- Andreas Ihle (born 1979), world champion and Olympic champion in canoe racing

=== Those associated with the town ===
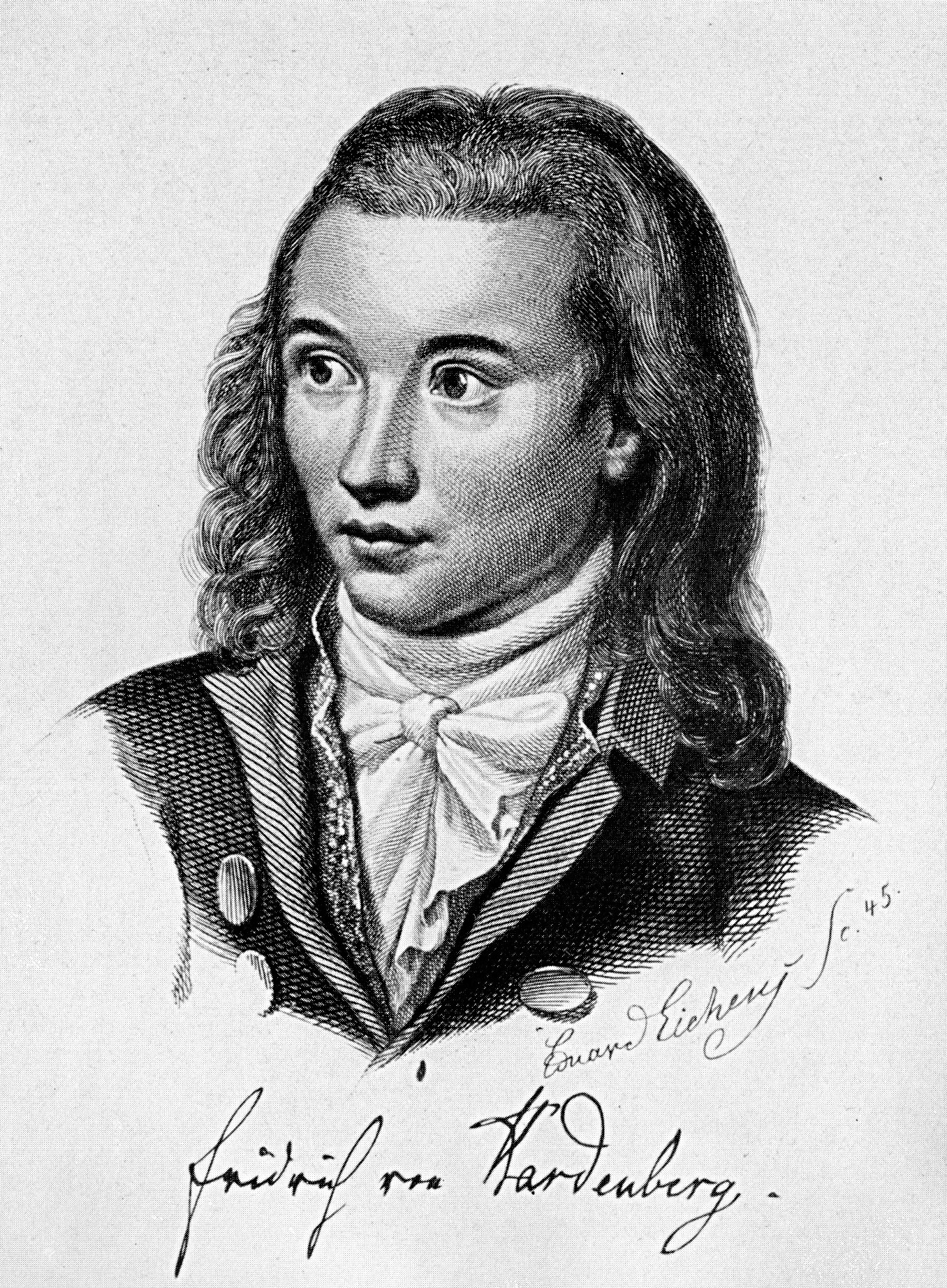
Novalis

- Novalis (1772–1801), early Romantics, philosopher and lawyer
- Johann Trommsdorff (1770–1837), pharmacist and chemist
- Karl von Fritsch (1838–1906), a paleontologist and geologist, president of the Leopoldina
- Ernst Fraenkel (political scientist) (1898–1975), political scientist and lawyer
- Karin Haftenberger, (born 1948), canoeist, competed in the 1968 Summer Olympics

== Twin towns – sister cities ==
- Melle, Germany
- Caudebec-lès-Elbeuf, France
- Ciechocinek, Poland
- Encs, Hungary

== Gallery ==
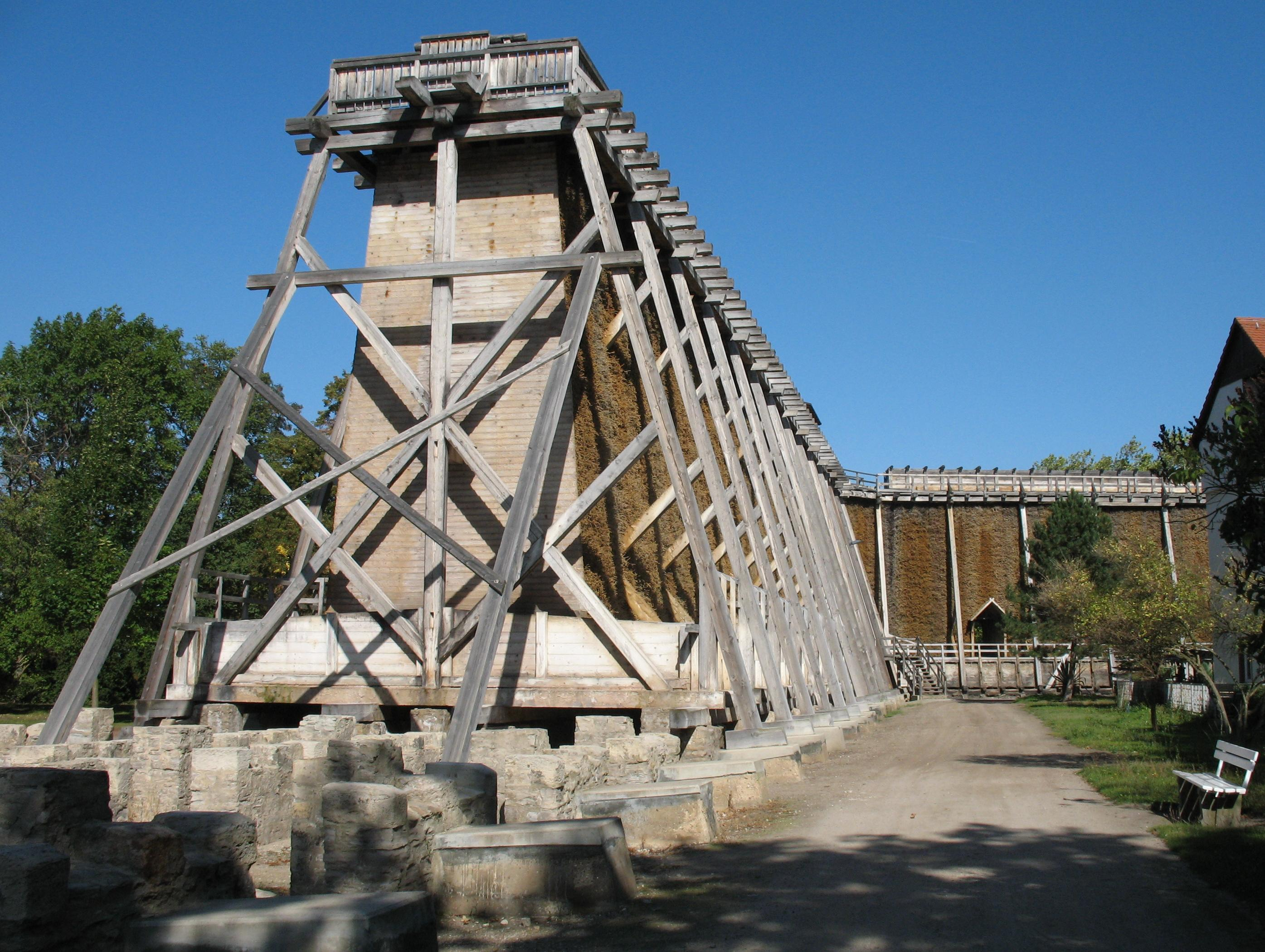
Graduation tower

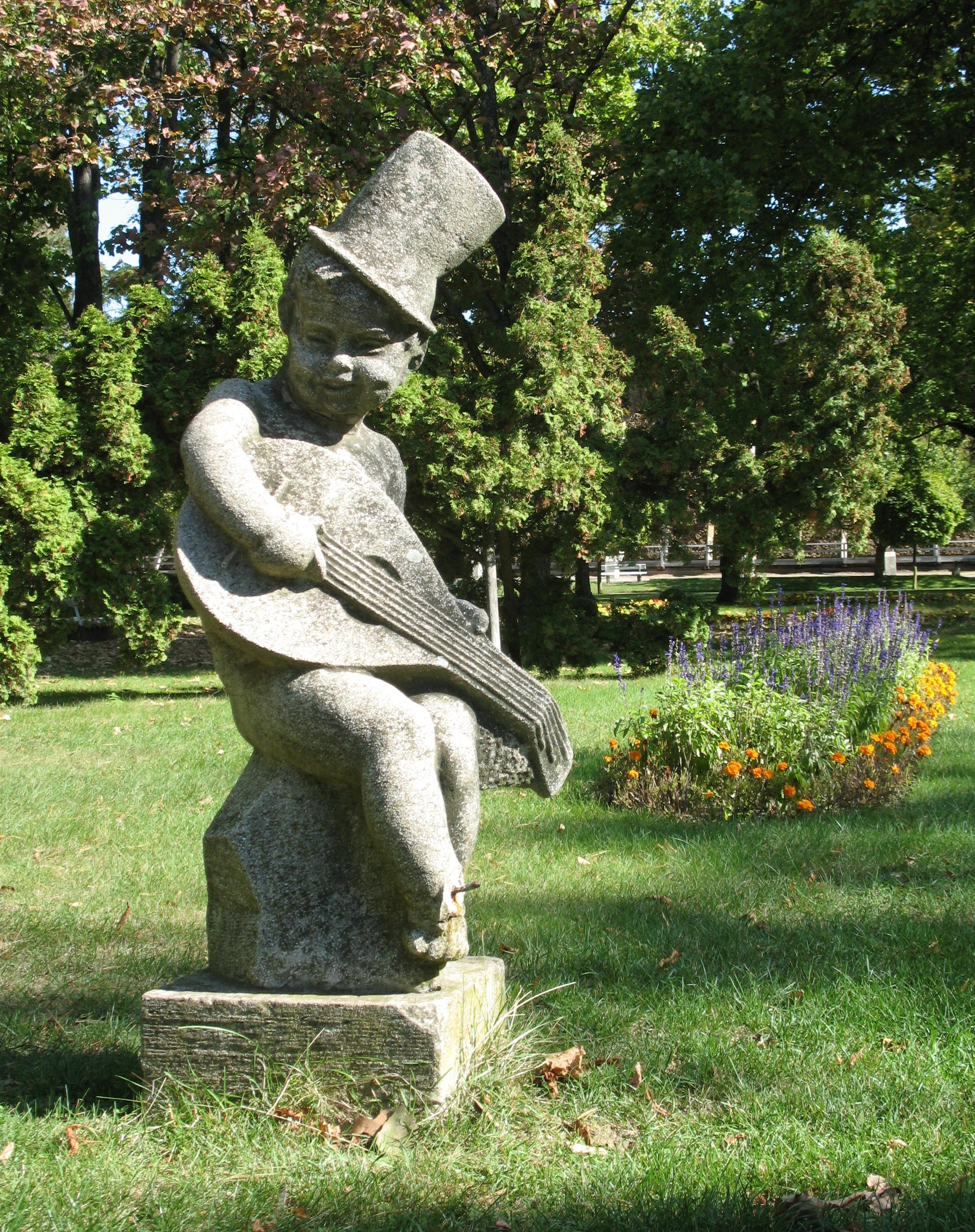
Spa gardens
Churches

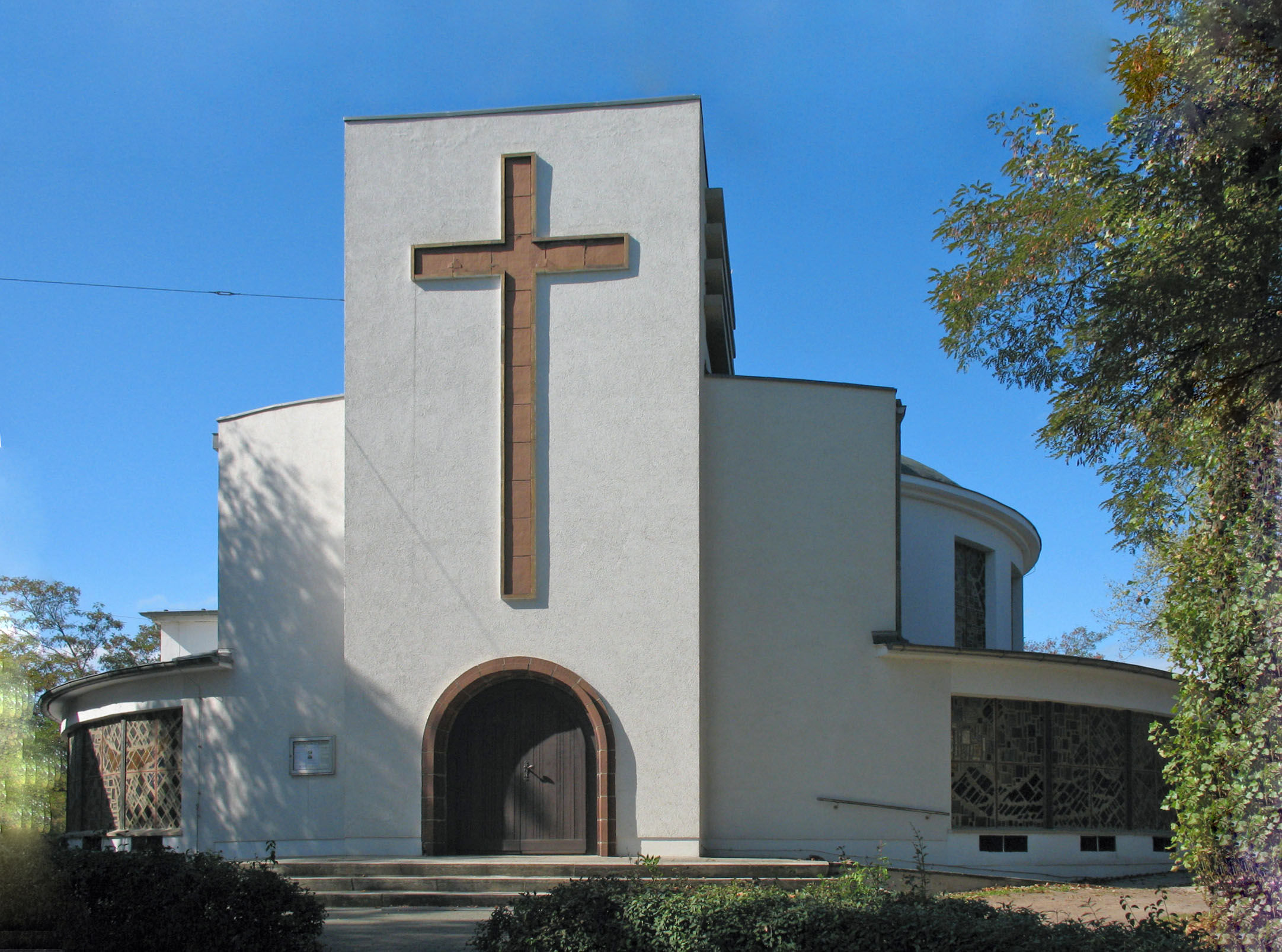

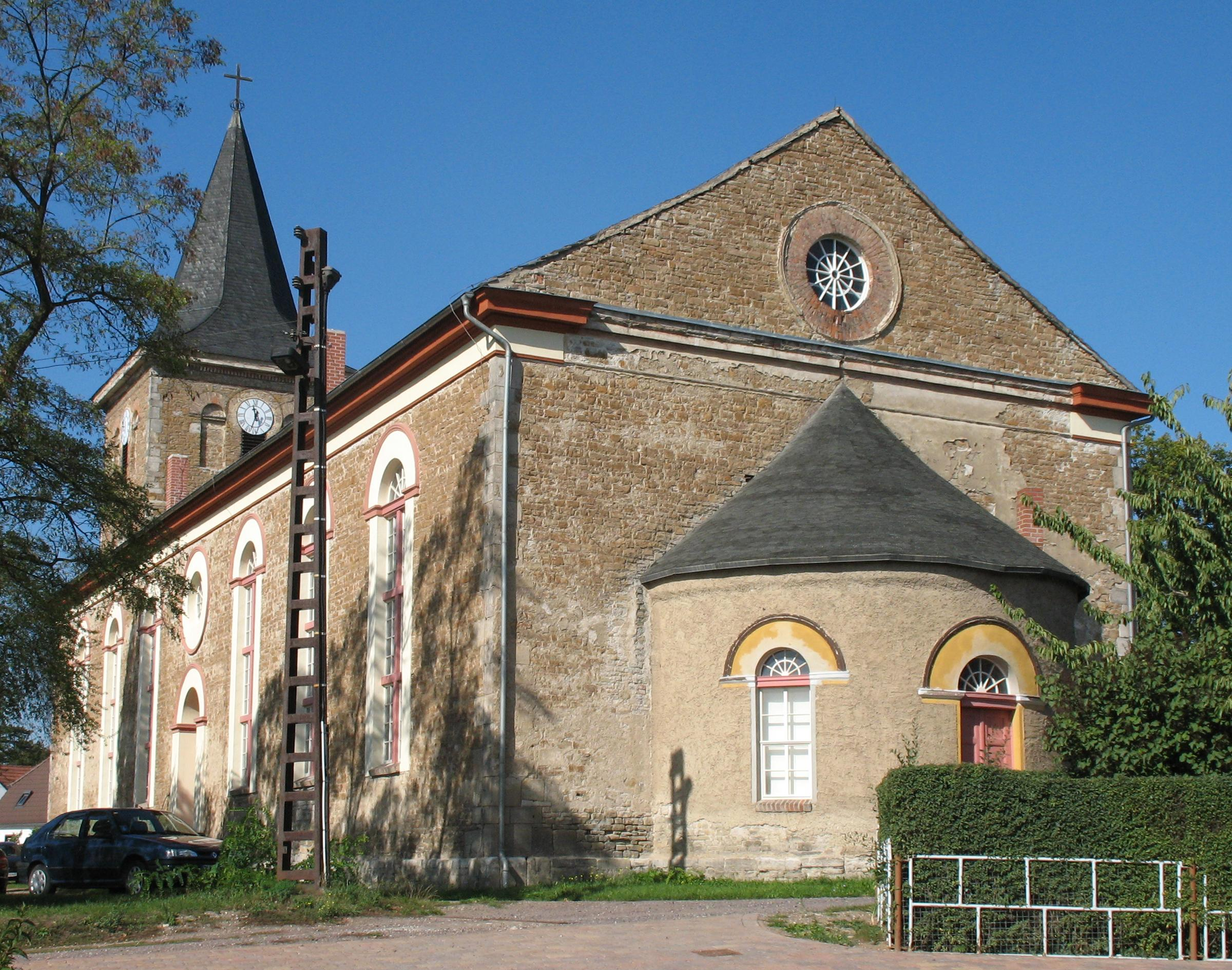

== See also ==
- Bad Dürrenberg burial
