= Mansfeld (electoral district) =

Federal electoral district of Germany

73 Mansfeld
- Electoral district for the Bundestag
- Mansfeld in 2025
- State: Saxony-Anhalt
- Population: 238,500 (2019)
- Electorate: 198,676 (2021)
- Major settlements: Sangerhausen; Köthen; Eisleben
- Area: 2,720.35 km^{2}

Current electoral district
- Created: 1990
- Party: AfD
- Member: Kay-Uwe Ziegler
- Elected: 2021, 2025

Mansfeld is an electoral constituency (German: Wahlkreis) represented in the Bundestag. It elects one member via first-past-the-post voting. Under the current constituency numbering system, it is designated as constituency 73. It is located in southern Saxony-Anhalt, comprising the Mansfeld-Südharz district, most of the Saalekreis district, and the western part of the Anhalt-Bitterfeld district.

Mansfeld was created for the inaugural 1990 federal election after German reunification. Since 2025, it has been represented by Kay-Uwe Ziegler who was elected for Alternative for Germany (AfD).

== Geography ==
Mansfeld is located in southern Saxony-Anhalt. As of the 2025 federal election, it comprises the entirety of the Mansfeld-Südharz district, the municipalities of Bad Lauchstädt, Mücheln, Querfurt, Salzatal, Teutschenthal, and Wettin-Löbejün and the collective municipality of Weida-Land from the Saalekreis district; as well as the municipalities of Aken (Elbe), Köthen, Osternienburger Land, and Südliches Anhalt from the Anhalt-Bitterfeld district.

== History ==
Mansfeld was created after German reunification in 1990, then known as Eisleben – Hettstedt – Sangerhausen. In the 2002 and 2005 elections, it was named Mansfelder Land. It acquired its current name in the 2009 election. In the 1990 through 1998 elections, it was constituency 295 in the numbering system. In the 2002 through 2009 elections, it was number 75. In the 2013 through 2021 elections, it was number 74. From the 2025 election, it has been number 73.

Originally, it comprised the districts of Eisleben, Hettstedt, and Sangerhausen. In the 2002 and 2005 elections, it comprised the districts of Sangerhausen and Mansfelder Land as well as the municipality of Querfurt and the municipal associations of Bad Lauchstädt, Oberes Geiseltal, and Weida-Land from Merseburg-Querfurt district. It was reconfigured in 2009; in 2025, the municipality of Merseburg was transferred out of the constituency in exchange for part of the Anhalt-Bitterfeld district.

| Election | No. | Name | Borders |
|---|---|---|---|
| 1990 | 295 | Eisleben – Hettstedt – Sangerhausen | Eisleben district; Hettstedt district; Sangerhausen district |
| 1994 | 295 | Eisleben – Hettstedt – Sangerhausen | Eisleben district; Hettstedt district; Sangerhausen district |
| 1998 | 295 | Eisleben – Hettstedt – Sangerhausen | Eisleben district; Hettstedt district; Sangerhausen district |
| 2002 | 75 | Mansfelder Land | Sangerhausen district; Mansfelder Land district; Merseburg-Querfurt district (only Querfurt municipality and Bad Lauchstädt, Oberes Geiseltal, and Weida-Land municipal associations) |
| 2005 | 75 | Mansfelder Land | Sangerhausen district; Mansfelder Land district; Merseburg-Querfurt district (only Querfurt municipality and Bad Lauchstädt, Oberes Geiseltal, and Weida-Land municipal associations) |
| 2009 | 75 | Mansfeld | Mansfeld-Südharz district; Saalekreis district (only Bad Lauchstädt, Merseburg, Mücheln, Querfurt, Salzatal, Teutschenthal, and Wettin-Löbejün municipalities and Weida-Land Verbandsgemeinde) |
| 2013 | 74 | Mansfeld | Mansfeld-Südharz district; Saalekreis district (only Bad Lauchstädt, Merseburg, Mücheln, Querfurt, Salzatal, Teutschenthal, and Wettin-Löbejün municipalities and Weida-Land Verbandsgemeinde) |
| 2017 | 74 | Mansfeld | Mansfeld-Südharz district; Saalekreis district (only Bad Lauchstädt, Merseburg, Mücheln, Querfurt, Salzatal, Teutschenthal, and Wettin-Löbejün municipalities and Weida-Land Verbandsgemeinde) |
| 2021 | 74 | Mansfeld | Mansfeld-Südharz district; Saalekreis district (only Bad Lauchstädt, Merseburg, Mücheln, Querfurt, Salzatal, Teutschenthal, and Wettin-Löbejün municipalities and Weida-Land Verbandsgemeinde) |
| 2025 | 73 | Mansfeld | Mansfeld-Südharz district; Saalekreis district (only Bad Lauchstädt, Mücheln, Querfurt, Salzatal, Teutschenthal, and Wettin-Löbejün municipalities and Weida-Land Verbandsgemeinde); Anhalt-Bitterfeld district (only Aken (Elbe), Köthen, Osternienburger Land, and Südliches Anhalt municipalities) |

== Members ==
The constituency was first represented by Heinz Rother of the Christian Democratic Union (CDU) from 1990 to 1994, followed by Frederick Schulze from 1994 to 1998. It was won by the Social Democratic Party (SPD) in 1998, and Silvia Schmidt served until 2009. Harald Koch of The Left was elected representative in 2009. The CDU's candidate Uda Heller won it in 2013 and served a single term. Torsten Schweiger of the CDU was elected in 2017. Robert Farle won the constituency for the Alternative for Germany (AfD) in 2021.

| Election | Member | Party | % |
|---|---|---|---|
| 1990 | Heinz Rother | CDU | 44.0 |
| 1994 | Frederick Schulze | CDU | 43.6 |
| 1998 | Silvia Schmidt | SPD | 41.4 |
| 2002 | Silvia Schmidt | SPD | 39.8 |
| 2005 | Silvia Schmidt | SPD | 32.8 |
| 2009 | Harald Koch | LINKE | 35.2 |
| 2013 | Uda Heller | CDU | 41.9 |
| 2017 | Torsten Schweiger | CDU | 31.0 |
| 2021 | Robert Farle | AfD | 25.1 |
| 2025 | Kay-Uwe Ziegler | AfD | 43.8 |

== Election results ==
=== 2025 election ===
Federal election (2025): Mansfeld
| Notes: | Blue background denotes the winner of the electorate vote. Pink background denotes a candidate elected from their party list. Yellow background denotes an electorate win by a list member, or other incumbent. A ✓ or ✗ denotes status of any incumbent, win or lose respectively. | | | | | | |
| Party | Candidate | Votes | % | ±% | Party votes | % | ±% |
|---|---|---|---|---|---|---|---|
| AfD | Kay-Uwe Ziegler | 70,307 | 43.8 | ▲19.0 | 69,616 | 43.1 | ▲19.5 |
| CDU | Frank Wyszkowski | 34,087 | 21.2 | ▼3.7 | 29,811 | 18.4 | ▼3.4 |
| BSW | | | | | 18,746 | 11.6 | New |
| Left | Matthias Schütz | 19,697 | 12.3 | ▲0.8 | 14,485 | 9.0 | ▼0.6 |
| SPD | Aick Pietschmann | 17,211 | 10.7 | ▼12.1 | 15,494 | 9.6 | ▼14.7 |
| FW | Marcel Enders | 5,615 | 3.5 | ▲0.5 | 2,168 | 1.3 | ▼0.4 |
| FDP | Jan Czekanowski | 5,527 | 3.4 | ▼4.8 | 5,230 | 3.2 | ▼6.3 |
| Greens | Marco Beckmann | 3,196 | 2.0 | ▼0.8 | 3,974 | 2.5 | ▼1.1 |
| Independent | Robert Farle | 2,978 | 1.9 | New | | | |
| Independent | Bernd Hartwig | 2,050 | 1.3 | New | | | |
| PARTEI | | | | | 988 | 0.6 | 0.0 |
| Volt | | | | | 616 | 0.4 | ▲0.3 |
| BD | | | | | 420 | 0.3 | New |
| MLPD | | | | | 105 | 0.1 | 0.0 |
| Informal votes | | 2,594 | | | 1,609 | | |
| Total valid votes | | 160,668 | | | 161,653 | | |
| Turnout | | 163,262 | 77.6 | ▲10.8 | | | |
| AfD hold | Majority | 36,220 | 22.6 | ▲22.4 | | | |

=== 2021 election ===
Federal election (2021): Mansfeld
| Notes: | Blue background denotes the winner of the electorate vote. Pink background denotes a candidate elected from their party list. Yellow background denotes an electorate win by a list member, or other incumbent. A ✓ or ✗ denotes status of any incumbent, win or lose respectively. | | | | | | |
| Party | Candidate | Votes | % | ±% | Party votes | % | ±% |
|---|---|---|---|---|---|---|---|
| AfD | Robert Farle | 32,930 | 25.1 | ▲1.2 | 31,476 | 23.9 | 0.0 |
| CDU | ✗ Torsten Schweiger | 32,732 | 24.9 | ▼6.1 | 28,411 | 21.6 | ▼7.2 |
| SPD | Katrin Budde | 30,969 | 23.6 | ▲8.4 | 32,109 | 24.4 | ▲10.0 |
| Left | Daniel Feuerberg | 13,108 | 10.0 | ▼8.1 | 11,680 | 8.9 | ▼8.5 |
| FDP | Ingo Bodtke | 11,089 | 8.4 | ▲0.4 | 12,792 | 9.7 | ▲1.6 |
| FW | Sarah Biedermann | 3,958 | 3.0 | | 2,163 | 1.6 | ▲0.8 |
| Greens | Mika-Sören Erdmann | 3,820 | 2.9 | ▲0.3 | 4,835 | 3.7 | ▲1.3 |
| dieBasis | Pierre Kynast | 2,731 | 2.1 | | 2,322 | 1.8 | |
| Tierschutzpartei | | | | | 1,683 | 1.3 | |
| Tierschutzallianz | | | | | 1,253 | 1.0 | ▼0.6 |
| PARTEI | | | | | 839 | 0.6 | ▼0.2 |
| Gartenpartei | | | | | 701 | 0.5 | ▲0.2 |
| NPD | | | | | 410 | 0.3 | ▼0.6 |
| Pirates | | | | | 341 | 0.3 | |
| Volt | | | | | 145 | 0.1 | |
| du. | | | | | 133 | 0.1 | |
| Humanists | | | | | 125 | 0.1 | |
| MLPD | | | | | 108 | 0.1 | 0.0 |
| ÖDP | | | | | 55 | 0.0 | |
| Informal votes | | 1,727 | | | 1,483 | | |
| Total valid votes | | 131,337 | | | 131,581 | | |
| Turnout | | 133,064 | 67.0 | ▼0.7 | | | |
| AfD gain from CDU | Majority | 198 | 0.2 | | | | |

=== 2017 election ===
Federal election (2017): Mansfeld
| Notes: | Blue background denotes the winner of the electorate vote. Pink background denotes a candidate elected from their party list. Yellow background denotes an electorate win by a list member, or other incumbent. A ✓ or ✗ denotes status of any incumbent, win or lose respectively. | | | | | | |
| Party | Candidate | Votes | % | ±% | Party votes | % | ±% |
|---|---|---|---|---|---|---|---|
| CDU | Torsten Schweiger | 42,725 | 31.0 | ▼10.9 | 39,751 | 28.8 | ▼12.4 |
| AfD | Uwe Scheidemann | 32,864 | 23.9 | | 32,982 | 23.9 | ▲19.8 |
| Left | Alexander Sorge | 24,863 | 18.1 | ▼9.5 | 23,909 | 17.3 | ▼8.4 |
| SPD | Katrin Budde | 20,864 | 15.2 | ▼2.9 | 19,835 | 14.4 | ▼2.8 |
| FDP | Andreas Silbersack | 11,091 | 8.1 | ▲6.2 | 11,236 | 8.1 | ▲5.2 |
| Greens | Katharina Schultheis | 3,647 | 2.6 | ▲0.2 | 3,250 | 2.4 | ▼0.4 |
| Tierschutzallianz | | | | | 2,074 | 1.5 | |
| NPD | Henry Kurt Lippold | 1,217 | 0.9 | ▼2.4 | 1,297 | 0.9 | ▼1.7 |
| PARTEI | | | | | 1,195 | 0.9 | |
| FW | | | | | 1,161 | 0.8 | ▼0.2 |
| MG | | | | | 446 | 0.3 | |
| BGE | | | | | 414 | 0.3 | |
| Independent | Adrian Mauson | 386 | 0.3 | | | | |
| DiB | | | | | 204 | 0.1 | |
| MLPD | | | | | 178 | 0.1 | 0.0 |
| Informal votes | | 2,566 | | | 2,291 | | |
| Total valid votes | | 137,657 | | | 127,932 | | |
| Turnout | | 140,223 | 67.7 | ▲6.6 | | | |
| CDU hold | Majority | 9,861 | 7.1 | ▼7.2 | | | |

=== 2013 election ===
Federal election (2013): Mansfeld
| Notes: | Blue background denotes the winner of the electorate vote. Pink background denotes a candidate elected from their party list. Yellow background denotes an electorate win by a list member, or other incumbent. A ✓ or ✗ denotes status of any incumbent, win or lose respectively. | | | | | | |
| Party | Candidate | Votes | % | ±% | Party votes | % | ±% |
|---|---|---|---|---|---|---|---|
| CDU | Uda Heller | 54,705 | 41.9 | ▲9.8 | 53,869 | 41.2 | ▲11.7 |
| Left | ✗ Harald Koch | 35,982 | 27.6 | ▼7.6 | 33,613 | 25.7 | ▼9.2 |
| SPD | Andreas Schmidt | 23,560 | 18.1 | ▲0.8 | 22,399 | 17.1 | ▲1.5 |
| AfD | | | | | 5,378 | 4.1 | |
| NPD | Volkmar Neugebauer | 4,277 | 3.3 | 0.0 | 3,478 | 2.7 | ▼0.1 |
| Greens | Norbert Jung | 3,193 | 2.4 | ▼1.6 | 3,637 | 2.8 | ▼0.9 |
| Pirates | Christian Kunze | 3,123 | 2.4 | | 2,235 | 1.7 | ▼0.2 |
| FDP | Harald Oster | 2,458 | 1.9 | ▼6.2 | 3,837 | 2.9 | ▼7.9 |
| FW | Julia Erika Gudrun Löser | 2,232 | 1.7 | | 1,403 | 1.1 | |
| Independent | Chris Pap | 881 | 0.7 | | | | |
| PRO | | | | | 485 | 0.4 | |
| MLPD | | | | | 200 | 0.2 | ▼0.1 |
| ÖDP | | | | | 160 | 0.1 | |
| Informal votes | | 2,572 | | | 2,289 | | |
| Total valid votes | | 130,411 | | | 130,694 | | |
| Turnout | | 132,983 | 61.1 | ▲2.1 | | | |
| CDU gain from Left | Majority | 18,723 | 14.3 | | | | |

=== 2009 election ===
Federal election (2009): Mansfeld
| Notes: | Blue background denotes the winner of the electorate vote. Pink background denotes a candidate elected from their party list. Yellow background denotes an electorate win by a list member, or other incumbent. A ✓ or ✗ denotes status of any incumbent, win or lose respectively. | | | | | | |
| Party | Candidate | Votes | % | ±% | Party votes | % | ±% |
|---|---|---|---|---|---|---|---|
| Left | Harald Koch | 47,051 | 35.2 | ▲8.2 | 46,802 | 34.9 | ▲6.7 |
| CDU | Uda Heller | 43,014 | 32.2 | ▲3.9 | 39,645 | 29.6 | ▲5.0 |
| SPD | ✗ Silvia Schmidt | 23,028 | 17.2 | ▼15.7 | 21,030 | 15.7 | ▼15.0 |
| FDP | Elke Weckner-Lömm | 10,818 | 8.1 | ▲2.4 | 14,574 | 10.9 | ▲1.8 |
| Greens | Gesine Haerting | 5,465 | 4.1 | ▲2.0 | 4,977 | 3.7 | ▲0.7 |
| NPD | Judith Rothe | 4,337 | 3.2 | ▼0.1 | 3,713 | 2.8 | ▼0.4 |
| Pirates | | | | | 2,623 | 2.0 | |
| DVU | | | | | 407 | 0.3 | |
| MLPD | | | | | 331 | 0.2 | ▼0.1 |
| Informal votes | | 3,127 | | | 2,738 | | |
| Total valid votes | | 133,713 | | | 134,102 | | |
| Turnout | | 136,840 | 59.0 | ▼11.8 | | | |
| Left gain from SPD | Majority | 4,037 | 3.0 | | | | |

=== 2005 election ===
Federal election (2005):Mansfeld
| Notes: | Blue background denotes the winner of the electorate vote. Pink background denotes a candidate elected from their party list. Yellow background denotes an electorate win by a list member, or other incumbent. A ✓ or ✗ denotes status of any incumbent, win or lose respectively. | | | | | | |
| Party | Candidate | Votes | % | ±% | Party votes | % | ±% |
|---|---|---|---|---|---|---|---|
| SPD | ✓ Silvia Schmidt | 46,826 | 32.8 | ▼7.0 | 44,034 | 30.8 | ▼11.0 |
| CDU | Uda Heller | 40,155 | 28.1 | ▼2.9 | 34,938 | 24.4 | ▼6.5 |
| Left | Uwe-Jens Rössel | 39,734 | 27.8 | ▲10.8 | 41,058 | 28.7 | ▲13.6 |
| FDP | Hans-Dieter Walter | 7,375 | 5.2 | ▼3.2 | 12,399 | 8.7 | ▲1.1 |
| NPD | Judith Rother | 4,964 | 3.5 | ▲2.1 | 4,698 | 3.3 | ▲2.1 |
| Greens | Sebastian Striegel | 2,333 | 1.7 | | 2,224 | 1.7 | ▲0.9 |
| Schill | Lutz Reuscher | 910 | 0.6 | | 373 | 0.3 | |
| MLPD | | | | | 496 | 0.3 | |
| Pro German Center – Pro D-Mark Initiative | | | | | 480 | 0.3 | |
| REP | | | | | 442 | 0.3 | |
| Informal votes | | 3,565 | | | 3,226 | | |
| Total valid votes | | 142,812 | | | 143,151 | | |
| Turnout | | 146,377 | 70.1 | ▲1.5 | | | |
| SPD hold | Majority | 6,671 | 4.7 | | | | |
