= Merseburg-Querfurt =

Coordinates: 51°22′N 12°00′E

- District
- Country: Germany
- State: Saxony-Anhalt
- Disbanded: 2007-07-01
- Capital: Merseburg

Area
  - Total: 804.66 km^{2} (310.68 sq mi)

Population (2002)
  - Total: 132,180
  - Density: 160/km^{2} (430/sq mi)
- Time zone: UTC+01:00 (CET)
  - Summer (DST): UTC+02:00 (CEST)
- Vehicle registration: MQ
- Website: merseburg-querfurt.de

Merseburg-Querfurt was a district (Kreis) in the south of Saxony-Anhalt, Germany. Neighboring districts were (from northwest clockwise) Sangerhausen, Mansfelder Land, Saalkreis, the district-free city Halle, the districts Delitzsch and Leipziger Land in Saxony, the districts Weißenfels and Burgenlandkreis, and the Kyffhäuserkreis in Thuringia.

== History ==
The district was created in 1994 by merging the previous districts Merseburg and Querfurt.

== Geography ==
The main river of the district is the Saale.

== Coat of arms ==
The cross in the top left and bottom right quarters of the coat of arms is the symbols of the diocese of Merseburg. The horizontal red-and-white bars in the other two quarters are the symbol of the Lords of Querfurt. The coat of arms thus combines the symbols of the two precursor districts.

== Towns and municipalities ==
Towns
1. Braunsbedra
2. Leuna
3. Querfurt
Verwaltungsgemeinschaften
1. Bad Dürrenberg (incl. town Bad Dürrenberg)
2. Bad Lauchstädt (incl. town Bad Lauchstädt)
3. Kötzschau
4. Laucha-Schwarzeiche (incl. town Schafstädt)
5. Merseburg (incl. town Merseburg)
6. Oberes Geiseltal (incl. town Mücheln)
7. Weida-Land (incl. town Schraplau)
Free municipalities
1. Schkopau
