= Anhalt (electoral district) =

Federal electoral district of Germany

Coordinates: 51°48′18″N 11°57′40″E

71 Anhalt
- Former electoral district for the Bundestag
- Anhalt in 2013
- State: Saxony-Anhalt
- Population: 257,900 (2019)
- Electorate: 214,563 (2021)
- Major settlements: Bitterfeld-Wolfen; Bernburg; Köthen (Anhalt)
- Area: 2,258.3 km^{2}

Former electoral district
- Created: 2002
- Abolished: 2025
- Party: AfD
- Member: Kay-Uwe Ziegler
- Elected: 2021

Anhalt was an electoral constituency (German: Wahlkreis) formerly represented in the Bundestag. It elected one member via first-past-the-post voting. It was located in central Saxony-Anhalt, comprising the Anhalt-Bitterfeld district and most of the Salzlandkreis district.

Anhalt was created for the 2002 federal election. It was abolished ahead of the 2025 federal election, as Saxony-Anhalt lost one of its constituencies.

== Geography ==
Anhalt was located in central Saxony-Anhalt. As of the 2021 federal election, it comprised the district of Anhalt-Bitterfeld as well as the Salzlandkreis district excluding the municipalities of Aschersleben, Barby, Bördeland, Calbe, Schönebeck, Seeland.

== History ==
Anhalt was created in 2002 and contained parts of the abolished constituencies of Dessau – Bitterfeld, Halle-Neustadt – Saalkreis – Köthen, and Wittenberg – Gräfenhainichen – Jessen – Roßlau – Zerbst. In the 2002 and 2005 elections, it was constituency 71 in the numbering system. In the 2009 election, it was number 72. From the 2013 election, it was number 71.

Originally, it comprised the independent city of Dessau and the districts of Köthen and Wittenberg. It was reconfigured ahead of the 2009 election, losing most of its former territory from the Wittenberg district and gaining area in the new Salzlandkreis and Anhalt-Bitterfeld districts.

Election	No.	Name	Borders
2002	71	Anhalt	Dessau city; Köthen district; Wittenberg district
2005	71	Anhalt	Dessau city; Köthen district; Wittenberg district
2009	72	Anhalt	Anhalt-Bitterfeld district; Salzlandkreis district (excluding Aschersleben and Seeland municipalities and the former Schönebeck district)
2013	71	Anhalt	Anhalt-Bitterfeld district; Salzlandkreis district (excluding Aschersleben, Barby, Bördeland, Calbe, Schönebeck, and Seeland municipalities)
2017	71	Anhalt	Anhalt-Bitterfeld district; Salzlandkreis district (excluding Aschersleben, Barby, Bördeland, Calbe, Schönebeck, and Seeland municipalities)
2021	71	Anhalt	Anhalt-Bitterfeld district; Salzlandkreis district (excluding Aschersleben, Barby, Bördeland, Calbe, Schönebeck, and Seeland municipalities)

== Members ==
The constituency was first represented by Engelbert Wistuba of the Social Democratic Party (SPD) from 2002 to 2009. It was won by Jan Korte of The Left in 2009. In 2013, Kees de Vries of the Christian Democratic Union (CDU) was elected representative. He was re-elected in 2017. Kay-Uwe Ziegler won the constituency for the Alternative for Germany (AfD) in 2021.

Election	Member	Party	%
2002	Engelbert Wistuba	SPD	40.3
2005	Engelbert Wistuba	SPD	33.6
2009	Jan Korte	LINKE	31.6
2013	Kees de Vries	CDU	41.0
2017	Kees de Vries	CDU	31.6
2021	Kay-Uwe Ziegler	AfD	24.2

== Election results ==
=== 2021 election ===
Federal election (2021): Anhalt
Notes:	Blue background denotes the winner of the electorate vote. Pink background denotes a candidate elected from their party list. Yellow background denotes an electorate win by a list member, or other incumbent. A ✓ or ✗ denotes status of any incumbent, win or lose respectively.						
Party	Candidate	Votes	%	±%	Party votes	%	±%
AfD	Kay-Uwe Ziegler	33,225	24.2	▲2.0	31,003	22.6	▲0.3
CDU	Frank Wyszkowski	32,295	23.5	▼8.0	29,823	21.7	▼9.0
SPD	Anne Stamm	28,386	20.7	▲7.8	33,055	24.0	▲10.1
Left	Jan Korte	20,246	14.8	▼6.4	14,249	10.4	▼7.4
FDP	Thorben Fiedler	10,637	7.8	▲1.4	12,705	9.2	▲1.8
FW	Ronny Schneider	4,845	3.5	▲0.8	2,902	2.1	▲0.6
Greens	Hans Schweizer	4,587	3.3	▲1.4	5,470	4.0	▲1.6
Tierschutzpartei					1,922	1.4	
dieBasis	Alkje Fontes	1,969	1.4		1,793	1.3	
Tierschutzallianz					1,437	1.0	▼0.5
Independent	Johanna Zimmermann	1,006	0.7				
PARTEI					905	0.7	▼0.1
Gartenpartei					868	0.6	▲0.2
NPD					374	0.3	▼0.6
Pirates					370	0.3	
Volt					149	0.1	
Humanists					138	0.1	
du.					133	0.1	
MLPD					94	0.1	▼0.1
ÖDP					56	0.0	
Informal votes		2,093			1,843		
Total valid votes		137,196			137,446		
Turnout		139,289	64.9	▼1.0			
AfD gain from CDU	Majority	930	0.7				

=== 2017 election ===
Federal election (2017): Anhalt
Notes:	Blue background denotes the winner of the electorate vote. Pink background denotes a candidate elected from their party list. Yellow background denotes an electorate win by a list member, or other incumbent. A ✓ or ✗ denotes status of any incumbent, win or lose respectively.						
Party	Candidate	Votes	%	±%	Party votes	%	±%
CDU	✓ Kees de Vries	45,843	31.6	▼9.4	44,620	30.7	▼10.9
AfD	Kay-Uwe Ziegler	32,281	22.2	▲17.7	32,349	22.2	▲17.4
Left	Jan Korte	30,757	21.2	▼7.6	25,887	17.8	▼7.9
SPD	Steffen Globig	18,687	12.9	▼2.5	20,289	13.9	▼2.9
FDP	Walter Reinhard Elß	9,213	6.3	▲4.3	10,848	7.5	▲4.9
FW	Steffen Reisbach	3,976	2.7	▲0.6	2,197	1.5	▲0.2
Greens	Ulrike Annemarie von Thadden	2,854	2.0	▼0.1	3,455	2.4	▼0.2
Tierschutzallianz					2,186	1.5	
PARTEI					1,111	0.8	
NPD	Holger Großöhmigen	1,029	0.7	▼1.8	1,204	0.8	▼1.7
MG					585	0.4	
BGE					334	0.2	
MLPD	Klaus Fuchs	552	0.4	▲0.1	289	0.2	0.0
DiB					185	0.1	
Informal votes		2,754			2,407		
Total valid votes		145,192			145,539		
Turnout		147,946	65.9	▲6.5			
CDU hold	Majority	13,562	9.4	▼2.8			

=== 2013 election ===
Federal election (2013): Anhalt
Notes:	Blue background denotes the winner of the electorate vote. Pink background denotes a candidate elected from their party list. Yellow background denotes an electorate win by a list member, or other incumbent. A ✓ or ✗ denotes status of any incumbent, win or lose respectively.						
Party	Candidate	Votes	%	±%	Party votes	%	±%
CDU	Kees de Vries	56,514	41.0	▲9.5	57,357	41.5	▲10.9
Left	✗ Jan Korte	39,715	28.8	▼2.7	35,425	25.6	▼7.6
SPD	Petra Börst-Harder	21,244	15.4	▼6.3	23,224	16.8	▲0.2
AfD	Daniel Roi	6,314	4.6		6,635	4.8	
NPD	Andreas Klar	3,450	2.5	▼0.1	3,516	2.5	▲0.2
FW	Hans-Werner Trummel	2,945	2.1		1,848	1.3	
Greens	Ingo Götze	2,884	2.1	▼1.4	3,572	2.6	▼1.1
FDP	Veit Wolpert	2,778	2.0	▼5.8	3,556	2.6	▼8.0
Pirates	Andreas Breitschu	1,720	1.2		2,200	1.6	▼0.6
PRO					389	0.3	
MLPD	Ina Korntreff	389	0.3	▼0.4	283	0.2	▼0.1
ÖDP					164	0.1	
Informal votes		2,714			2,498		
Total valid votes		137,953			138,169		
Turnout		140,667	59.4	▲1.9			
CDU gain from Left	Majority	16,799	12.2				

=== 2009 election ===
Federal election (2009): Anhalt
Notes:	Blue background denotes the winner of the electorate vote. Pink background denotes a candidate elected from their party list. Yellow background denotes an electorate win by a list member, or other incumbent. A ✓ or ✗ denotes status of any incumbent, win or lose respectively.						
Party	Candidate	Votes	%	±%	Party votes	%	±%
Left	Jan Korte	44,087	31.6	▲7.5	46,628	33.3	▲6.5
CDU	Kees de Vries	43,722	31.3	▲3.5	42,696	30.5	▲5.7
SPD	Klaas Hübner	30,401	21.8	▼14.2	23,225	16.6	▼15.3
FDP	Dirk Faust	10,929	7.8	▲2.7	14,764	10.6	▲1.8
Greens	Wolfgang Siewert	4,878	3.5	▲1.3	5,221	3.7	▲0.6
NPD	Philipp Valenta	3,649	2.6	▼0.5	3,315	2.4	▼0.4
Pirates					3,066	2.2	
MLPD	Ina Korntreff	888	0.6	▲0.1	483	0.3	▼0.1
DVU					445	0.3	
Informal votes		3,442			3,285		
Total valid votes		139,686			139,843		
Turnout		143,128	57.6	▼11.7			
Left win new seat	Majority	365	0.3				
