= Katja Pähle =

German politician

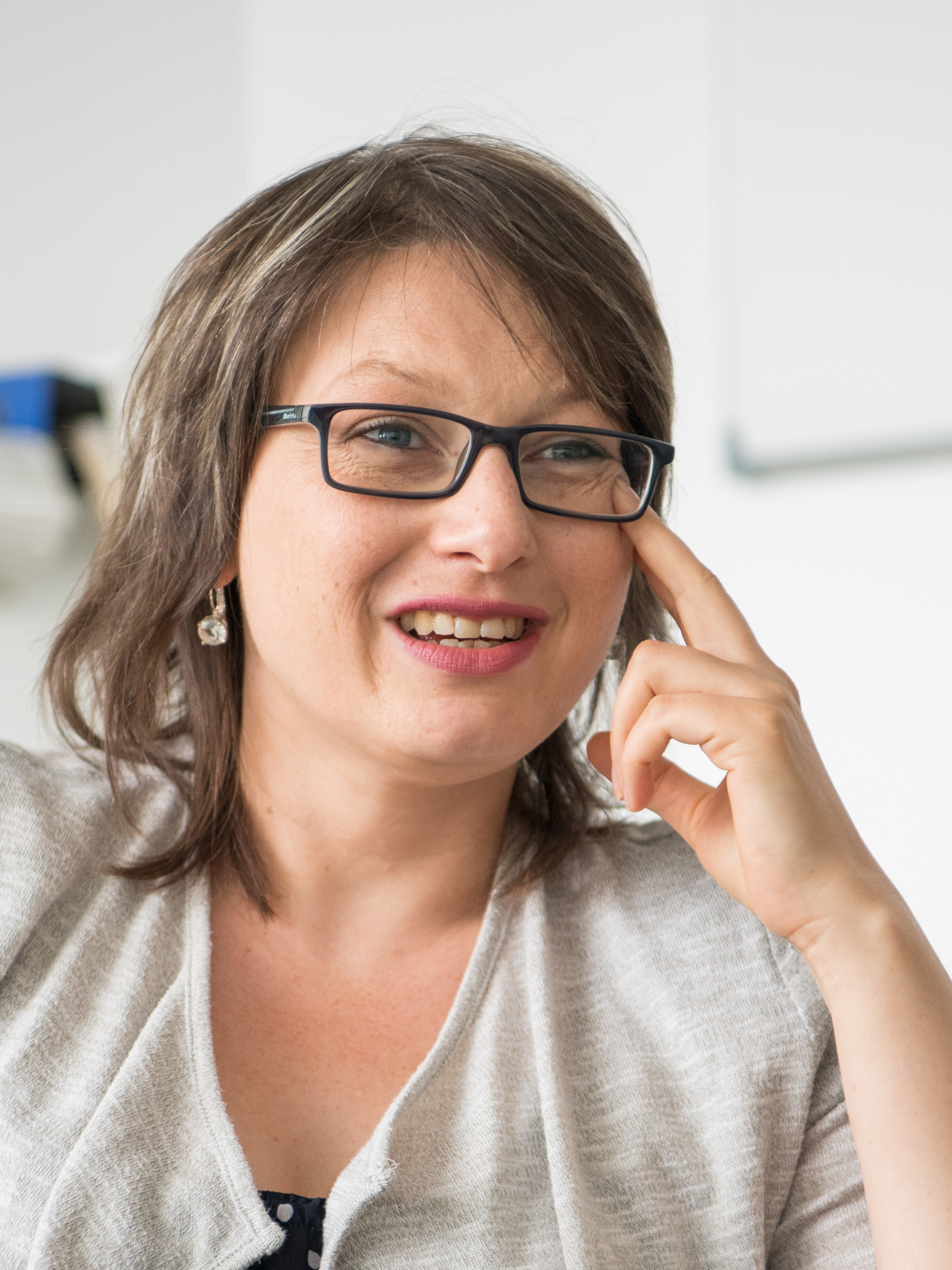
- Pähle in 2019

Leader of the Social Democratic Party in the Landtag of Saxony-Anhalt
- Incumbent
- Assumed office 26 April 2016
- Preceded by: Katrin Budde

Deputy Leader of the Social Democratic Party in Saxony-Anhalt
- Incumbent
- Assumed office 2015
- Leader: Katrin Budde (−2016); Burkhard Lischka (2016–2020); Juliane Kleemann (2020–); Andreas Schmidt (2020–)

Member of the Landtag of Saxony-Anhalt
- Incumbent
- Assumed office 20 March 2011
- Constituency: Party list

Personal details
- Born: 27 June 1977 (age 48) Wippra, East Germany
- Party: Social Democratic Party of Germany
- Children: 2

Katja Pähle (born 27 June 1977) is a German politician of the Social Democratic Party (SPD). Since 2016, she has served as chairwoman of the SPD parliamentary group in the Landtag of Saxony-Anhalt. She has also been deputy leader of the party's state branch since 2015, and a member of the SPD federal executive since 2017. She was the party's lead candidate for the 2021 Saxony-Anhalt state election.

== Early life and career ==
Pehle grew up in Hettstedt in Mansfelder Land, and graduated from high school in 1996. She studied sociology and psychology at Martin Luther University of Halle-Wittenberg, and received her PhD in 2010.

Pähle subsequently worked as a research assistant at the Collaborative Research Center 580 at the Deutsche Forschungsgemeinschaft. From 2008 to 2011 she worked in the State Ministry of Health and Social Affairs in Magdeburg as a personal advisor in the ministerial office.

== Political career ==
=== Career in state politics ===
In 1999 Pähle became a member of the SPD. From 2005 to 2013 she was chairwoman of the SPD city association in Halle. From 2004 to 2008 she sat as an expert resident in the social committee of the Halle city council. Since 2008, she has been a member of the SPD state executive.

Pähle was the SPD's candidate for the constituency of Halle II in the 2011 Saxony-Anhalt state election. She failed to win the constituency, but was elected via the party list and became a member of the Landtag. In 2015, she became deputy chairwoman of the state party. She was re-elected to the Landtag in the 2016 state election; after Katrin Budde resigned in the face of the party's disastrous result, Pähle became interim party leader. When the new Landtag sat, she was chosen as the new chair of the SPD parliamentary group.

In December 2017, Pähle became a member of the federal SPD executive. Since November 2019 she has served on the party presidium.

On 10 July 2020, Pähle was elected as the party's lead candidate for the 2021 state election. In an election among the party membership, she defeated political scientist Roger Stöcker, winning 834 votes (52.5%) to Stöcker's 652 (41.0%).

=== Role in national politics ===
In the negotiations to form a so-called traffic light coalition of the SPD, the Green Party and the FDP following the 2021 federal elections, Pähle led her party's delegation in the working group on health policy; her co-chairs from the other parties were Maria Klein-Schmeink and Christine Aschenberg-Dugnus.

Pähle was nominated by her party as delegate to the Federal Convention for the purpose of electing the President of Germany in 2022.

== Personal life ==
Pähle is married and has two daughters.
