= Torsten Schweiger =

German politician

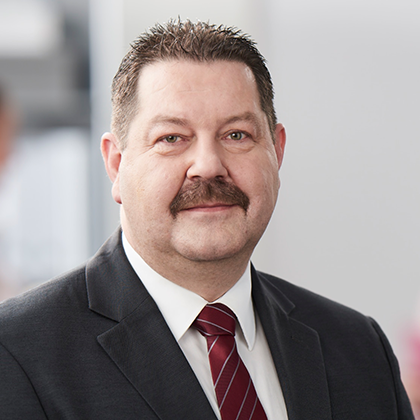
- Torsten Schweiger in 2017

Member of the Bundestag for Mansfeld
- In office 2017–2021
- Preceded by: Uda Heller
- Succeeded by: Robert Farle

Personal details
- Born: 29 February 1968 (age 58) Gräfenhainichen, East Germany (now Germany)
- Party: CDU

Torsten Schweiger (born 29 February 1968) is a German politician. Born in Gräfenhainichen, Saxony-Anhalt, he represents the CDU. Torsten Schweiger served as a member of the Bundestag from the state of Saxony-Anhalt from 2017 to 2021.

== Life ==
He became member of the bundestag after the 2017 German federal election. He is a member of the Committee on the Environment, Nature Conservation and Nuclear Safety and the Committee on Construction, Housing, Urban Development and Communities.
