= Louise Elisabeth of Württemberg-Oels =

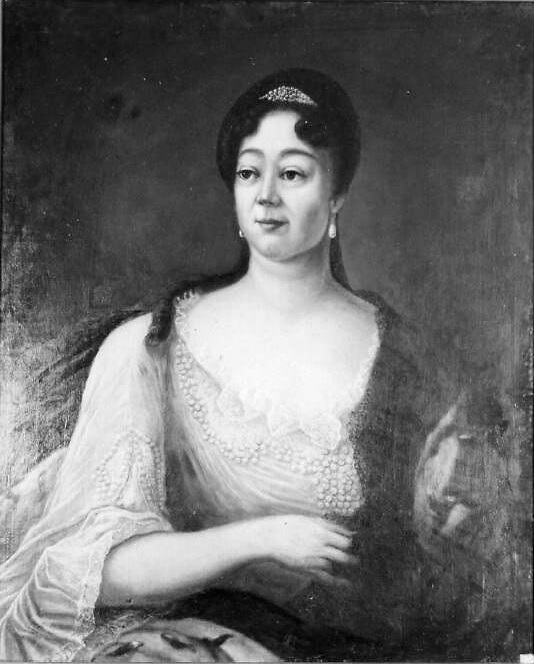
- Portrait of Louise Elisabeth of Saxe-Merseburg-Lauchstädt

Duchess consort of Saxe-Merseburg-Lauchstädt
- Tenure: 1688-1690
- Born: 4 March 1673; Bernstadt
- Died: 28 April 1736 (aged 63); Forst
- Spouse: Philipp, Duke of Saxe-Merseburg-Lauchstädt
- Issue: Christian Louis, Hereditary Prince of Saxe-Merseburg-Lauchstädt
- House: Württemberg
- Father: Christian Ulrich I, Duke of Württemberg-Oels
- Mother: Anna Elisabeth, Princess of Anhalt-Bernburg

Louise Elisabeth of Württemberg-Oels (4 March 1673 – 28 April 1736), was a Duchess of Württemberg-Oels by birth and by marriage Duchess of Saxe-Merseburg-Lauchstädt. In 1709, she revived the Ducal Württemberg-Oels Order of the Skull as a chivalric order for ladies.

== Early life and family ==
Born in Bernstadt (now called Bierutów), the capital of the Duchy of Bernstadt in Silesia, she was the eldest of the seven children of Duke Christian Ulrich I of Württemberg-Oels and his first wife, Anna Elisabeth, a daughter of Prince Christian II of Anhalt-Bernburg and Eleonore Sophie of Schleswig-Holstein-Sonderburg.

Her mother died after complications in her last childbirth on 3 September 1680 and her father remarried three more times: in Doberlug on 27 October 1683 to Sibylle Maria, a daughter of Duke Christian I of Saxe-Merseburg; in Hamburg on 4 February 1695 to Sophie Wilhelmine, a daughter of Prince Enno Louis Cirksena of East Frisia and in Güstrow on 6 December 1700 with Sophia, a daughter of Duke Gustav Adolph of Mecklenburg-Güstrow. Louise Elisabeth and her younger sister Sophie Angelika (by marriage Duchess of Saxe-Zeitz-Pegau-Neustadt) are the only surviving children from her parents' marriage. From her father's later marriages she had eight half-siblings, of whom only three survive adulthood: Charles Frederick II, Duke of Württemberg-Oels, Christian Ulrich II, Duke of Württemberg-Wilhelminenort (both sons of Sibylle Maria) and Auguste Louise (daughter of Sophie Wilhelmine; by marriage Duchess of Saxe-Weissenfels-Barby).

== Life ==
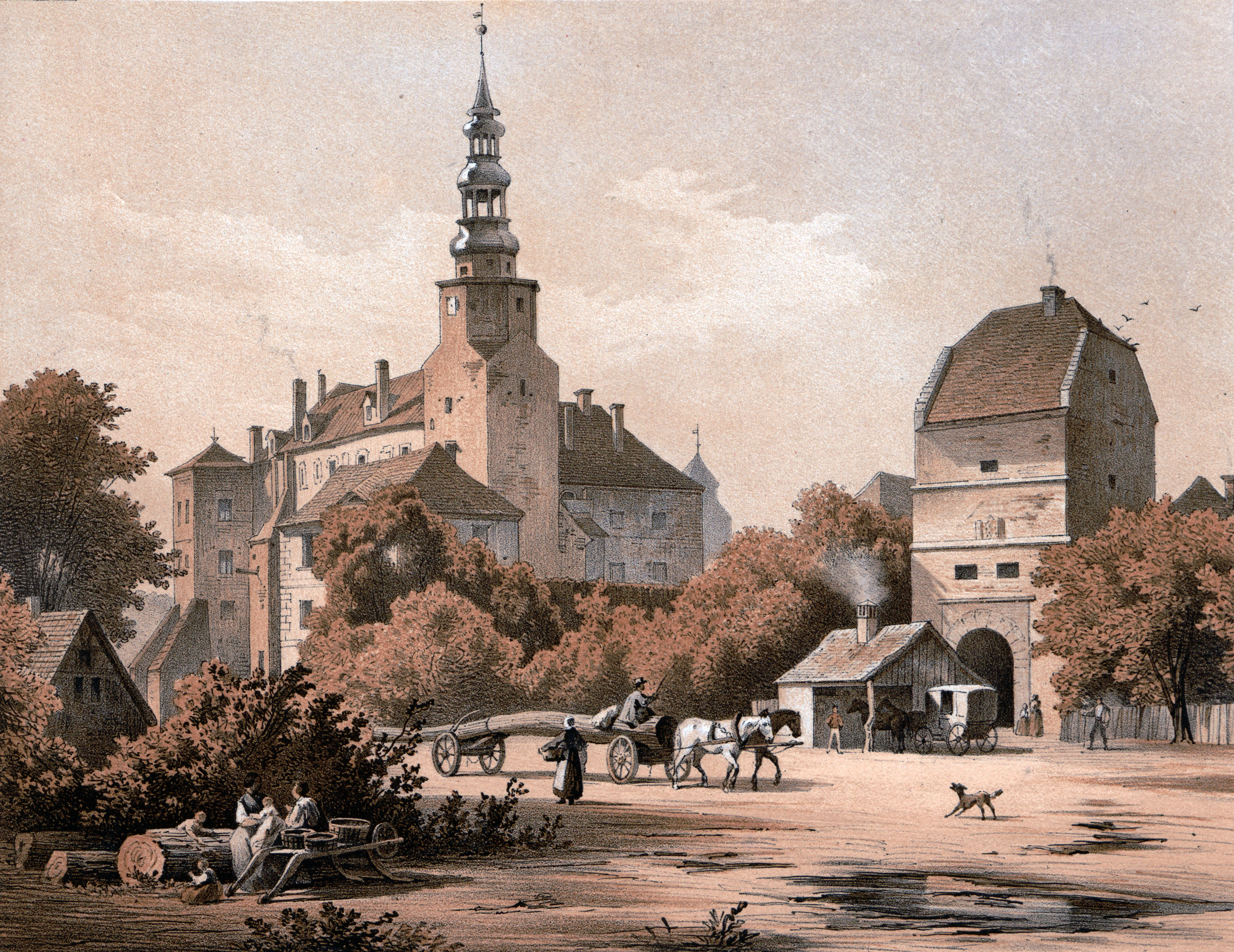
Bernstadt Castle in 1860; Louise Elisabeth was born here in 1673.

On 20 August 1688, at the age of 15, Louise Elizabeth married Duke Philip of Saxe-Merseburg-Lauchstädt as his second wife. He was 31 years old and was an elder brother of her stepmother Marie Sibylle. A medal was struck to commemorate their marriage. After the wedding, the couple resided in Merseburg, where their son Christian Louis was born on 21 July 1689. One year later (1690) and within days, she lost both her son (6 June) and her husband, when he fell during the Battle of Fleurus on 1 July. Louise Elisabeth had followed her husband to Fleurus, and the camp where she stayed was attacked by the French. Afterwards, she had trouble journeying back to Merseburg and thence to Lauchstädt.

In 1704, her father died. That same year, she moved from Lauchstädt Castle to her widow seat in Forst. The castle in Forst had been uninhabited since Ferdinand II of Bieberstein, its last inhabitant, had died in 1667. She had it renewed and expanded and added a chapel. The great hall above the entrance gate was used as the castle chapel. Her court was managed by her High Hofmeister Carl Gottlob von Goldstein auf Passendorf und Angersdorf his wife, Christian Sibylle née Marschall von Bieberstein assisted by two more Hofmeisters, Otto Heinrich von Vibra and Bodo Gottlieb von Koseritz. Her equerry was Hans Günther von Bomsdorf auf Weissagk, and after his death, a Baron von Lossow. She also employed several Chambermaids, quite a few pages, a court deacon, a chaplain, a personal physician, and after 1710 a court cantor, who also supervised the pages, and a catechist, who assisted the chaplain and educated the children of her staff. She further employed a conductor and several musicians, most of whom were also lackeys, a chamber singer, a female court midget, a court manager, a quartermaster, a gardener, and a number of servants with all sorts of job titles.

In 1709, she revived the Ducal Württemberg-Oels Order of the Skull as a chivalric order for ladies. Also in 1709, the first post office opened in Forst. It was housed in her palace, because of her commitment

Between 1717 and 1721, her small court orchestra was directed by Christian August Jacobi (1688 – after 1725). In 1718, he composed his Christmas cantata Der Himmel steht uns wieder offen for tenor solo, string ensemble, trumpet and basso continuo, first performed on Christmas Day 1718 in the court chapel. This cantata is considered representative of the Saxon baroque music and is still performed occasionally in the Frauenkirche in Dresden.

She lived in Forst until her death; she died on 28 April 1736. She was buried in the crypt of the St. Nicholas church in Forst (Lausitz).

== Legacy ==
The Elisabethstraße in Forst was named after her. It is close to the location of her palace, which no longer exists. The exact location of her grave in the St. Nicholas church is unknown.

== Issue ==
From her marriage, Louise Elisabeth had a son:

- Christian Louis (21 July 1689 in Merseburg – 6 June 1690, ibid.), Hereditary Prince of Saxe-Merseburg-Lauchstädt

Louise Elisabeth of Württemberg-Oels House of Württemberg Born: 4 March 1673 Died: 28 April 1690
German royalty
Vacant Title last held by Eleonore Sophie of Saxe-Weimar	Duchess consort of Saxe-Merseburg-Lauchstädt; 1688-1690	Duchy reincorporated to Saxe-Merseburg
