= Striegel =

Striegel is a surname. Notable people with the surname include:

- Bill Striegel (1936-1992), American footballer
- Sebastian Striegel (born 1981), German politician
