= Eleonore Sophie of Saxe-Weimar =

Duchess consort of Saxe-Merseburg-Lauchstädt
- Tenure: 1684–1687
- Born: 22 March 1660; Güstrow
- Died: 4 February 1687 (aged 26); Lauchstädt
- Spouse: Philipp, Duke of Saxe-Merseburg-Lauchstädt
- House: Wettin
- Father: John Ernest II, Duke of Saxe-Weimar
- Mother: Christine Elisabeth of Schleswig-Holstein-Sonderburg

Eleonore Sophie of Saxe-Weimar (22 March 1660 – 4 February 1687), was a German noblewoman member of the House of Wettin and by marriage Duchess of Saxe-Merseburg-Lauchstädt.

Born in Weimar, she was the third of five children born from the marriage of John Ernest II, Duke of Saxe-Weimar and Christine Elisabeth of Schleswig-Holstein-Sonderburg.

== Life ==
In Weimar on 9 July 1684 Eleonore Sophie married Prince Philipp of Saxe-Merseburg, third surviving son of Duke Christian I. Shortly after the wedding, he received the town of Lauchstädt as his appanage, and took his residence there.

The marriage produced two children, neither of whom survived to adulthood:

1. Christiana Ernestina (Merseburg, 16 September 1685 – Merseburg, 20 June 1689).
2. John William, Hereditary Prince of Saxe-Merseburg-Lauchstädt (Lauchstädt, 27 January 1687 – Merseburg, 21 June 1687).

Eleonore Sophie died in Lauchstädt aged 26, eight days after the birth of her son, probably from childbirth complications. She was buried in Merseburg Cathedral.

Eleonore Sophie of Saxe-Weimar House of Wettin Born: 22 March 1660 Died: 4 February 1687
German royalty
| New creation | Duchess consort of Saxe-Merseburg-Lauchstädt; 1684-1687 | Vacant Title next held by Louise Elisabeth of Württemberg-Oels |
