= Laucha-Schwarzeiche =

Former Verwaltungsgemeinschaft in Saxony-Anhalt, Germany

Coordinates: 51°23′N 11°47′E

Laucha-Schwarzeiche was a Verwaltungsgemeinschaft ("collective municipality") in the Saalekreis district, in Saxony-Anhalt, Germany. It was situated southwest of Halle (Saale). The seat of the Verwaltungsgemeinschaft was in Schafstädt. It was disbanded in January 2008, and its member municipalities were incorporated by Bad Lauchstädt.

The Verwaltungsgemeinschaft Laucha-Schwarzeiche consisted of the following municipalities (population in 2005 between brackets):

- Delitz am Berge (992)
- Schafstädt (2.187)
