= Robert Farle =

German politician (born 1950)

Member of the Bundestag
- In office German Bundestag in 2021 – German Bundestag in 2025

Personal details
- Born: 16 February 1950 (age 76)

Robert Farle (born 16 February 1950) is a German tax consultant, lawyer and politician. He had been a Member of the German Bundestag for Mansfeld since 2021; after he lost reelection in the 2025 federal election, his term ended in March 2025.

== Early life ==
Farle studied economics and business administration at the Ruhr University in Bochum from 1968 to 1974. After the end of East Germany, Farle went to Halle and founded a business and tax consulting company there in 1990. From 1999 to 2004, Farle also studied law at the Martin Luther University in Halle-Wittenberg. After his legal traineeship, Farle was admitted to become a lawyer in 2006.

== Early political career ==
Until 1992, Robert Farle was active in the German Communist Party in North Rhine-Westphalia for 17 years. His roles included that of DKP chairman at the Ruhr University and on the city council in Gladbeck. In the 1980s, Farle was employed as a full-time official in the DKP Ruhr-Westphalia district in Essen. According to a report by T-online, he received money from the SED for years, which Erich Honecker had personally approved. After the fall of the Berlin Wall and reunification, he used his old communist contacts for business purposes.

== Member of the Saxony-Anhalt Landtag ==
In May 2015, Farle would join the AfD, and would enter the Landtag of Saxony-Anhalt after the 2016 Saxony-Anhalt state election. Farle would not run for re-election in 2021.

== Member of the Bundestag ==
In the 2021 federal election, he ran for the direct mandate in the Mansfeld constituency without being on the AfD Saxony-Anhalt state list. He won the direct mandate with 25.1% of the first votes and thus entered the 20th German Bundestag.

On September 8, 2022, Farle resigned from the AfD parliamentary group and has been a non-affiliated member of parliament since then. According to Zeit Online, he had previously threatened his parliamentary colleagues with resignation in connection with the Russian attack on Ukraine, in anger over their "one-sided accusations" against Russian President Vladimir Putin.

Farle ran for re-election in Mansfeld in 2025, however he received 1.9% of the vote as an independent while the AfD's Kay-Uwe Ziegler won the seat with 43.8% of the vote.

== See also ==
- List of members of the 20th Bundestag
