= Oberes Geiseltal =

Coordinates: 51°18′N 11°48′E

Oberes Geiseltal was a Verwaltungsgemeinschaft ("collective municipality") in the Saalekreis district, in Saxony-Anhalt, Germany. It was situated southwest of Halle (Saale). The seat of the Verwaltungsgemeinschaft was in Mücheln.

It was disbanded on 1 January 2010.

The Verwaltungsgemeinschaft Oberes Geiseltal consisted of the following municipalities:

1. Mücheln;
2. Oechlitz.
