= Philipp, Duke of Saxe-Merseburg-Lauchstädt =

German prince

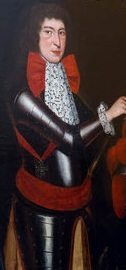

Philipp, Duke of Saxe-Merseburg-Lauchstädt (26 October 1657 – 1 July 1690) was a German prince. He was a member of the House of Wettin.

He was born in Merseburg, the fifth but third surviving son of Christian I, Duke of Saxe-Merseburg and Christiana of Schleswig-Holstein-Sonderburg-Glücksburg.

== Life ==
In order to give his three younger sons a proper land to live, Duke Christian I, before his death assigned to them in each case his own small territories as appanages; however, the allowances of them remained in the Saxe-Merseburg main line and with this, their powers over that lands were strongly limited. Philipp received in 1684 the town of Lauchstädt and founded the line of Saxe-Merseburg-Lauchstädt. He was allowed to develop and rebuild the castle (which was strongly damaged during the Thirty Years' War) for himself and his family, and later used the castle church as a City parish church (German: Stadtpfarrkirche). In November 1685 the first christening could already take place in the new church in the semifinished nave.

Philipp was completely devoted to his military career as an officer in the Imperial army against King Louis XIV of France and was killed in the Battle of Fleurus (1690). He died without surviving male issue, his second and only surviving son having died just one month before him, and predeceased his father. Thereafter, Lauchstädt was merged back into the duchy of Saxe-Merseburg.

== Marriage and issue ==
In Weimar on 9 July 1684 Philipp married firstly with Eleonore Sophie of Saxe-Weimar. They had two children, neither of whom survived to adulthood:

1. Christiana Ernestina (b. Merseburg, 16 September 1685 – d. Merseburg, 20 June 1689) died in early childhood.
2. John William, Hereditary Prince of Saxe-Merseburg-Lauchstädt (b. Lauchstädt, 27 January 1687 – d. Merseburg, 21 June 1687) died in infancy.

In Bernstadt on 17 August 1688 and eighteen months after the death of his first wife, Philipp married secondly with Louise Elisabeth of Württemberg-Oels. They had one son:

1. Christian Louis, Hereditary Prince of Saxe-Merseburg-Lauchstädt (b. Merseburg, 21 July 1689 – d. Merseburg, 6 June 1690) died in infancy.
