= Karl August Adolf von Krafft =

General of Infantry Karl August Adolf von Krafft (9 November 1764, in Delitz am Berge – 18 April 1840, in Königsberg) was a Prussian officer who fought in the Napoleonic Wars.
