= Milzau =

- Stadtteil of Bad Lauchstädt
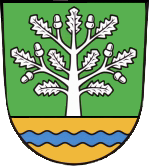
- Coat of arms
- Interactive map of Milzau
- Location within Germany Location within Saxony-Anhalt
- Coordinates: 51°23′N 11°54′E
- Country: Germany
- State: Saxony-Anhalt
- District: Saalekreis
- Town: Bad Lauchstädt

Area
  - Total: 17.34 km^{2} (6.70 sq mi)
- Elevation: 94 m (308 ft)

Population (2006-12-31)
  - Total: 960
  - Density: 55/km^{2} (140/sq mi)
- Time zone: UTC+01:00 (CET)
  - Summer (DST): UTC+02:00 (CEST)
- Postal codes: 06246
- Dialling codes: 034635

Milzau is a village and a former municipality in the district Saalekreis, in Saxony-Anhalt, Germany. Since 1 January 2010, it is part of the town Bad Lauchstädt, prior to that it was part of the Verwaltungsgemeinschaft Bad Lauchstädt.
