= Klobikau =

Coordinates: 51°21′N 11°50′E

Klobikau is a former municipality in the Saalekreis district, Saxony-Anhalt, Germany. Since January 2008, it is part of the town Bad Lauchstädt.
