= Bad Lauchstädt (Verwaltungsgemeinschaft) =

Coordinates: 51°22′N 11°50′E

Bad Lauchstädt was a Verwaltungsgemeinschaft ("collective municipality") in the Saalekreis district, in Saxony-Anhalt, Germany. The seat of the Verwaltungsgemeinschaft was in Bad Lauchstädt. It was disbanded on 1 January 2010.

The Verwaltungsgemeinschaft Bad Lauchstädt consisted of the following municipalities:

1. Bad Lauchstädt
2. Milzau
