= Kees de Vries =

German politician

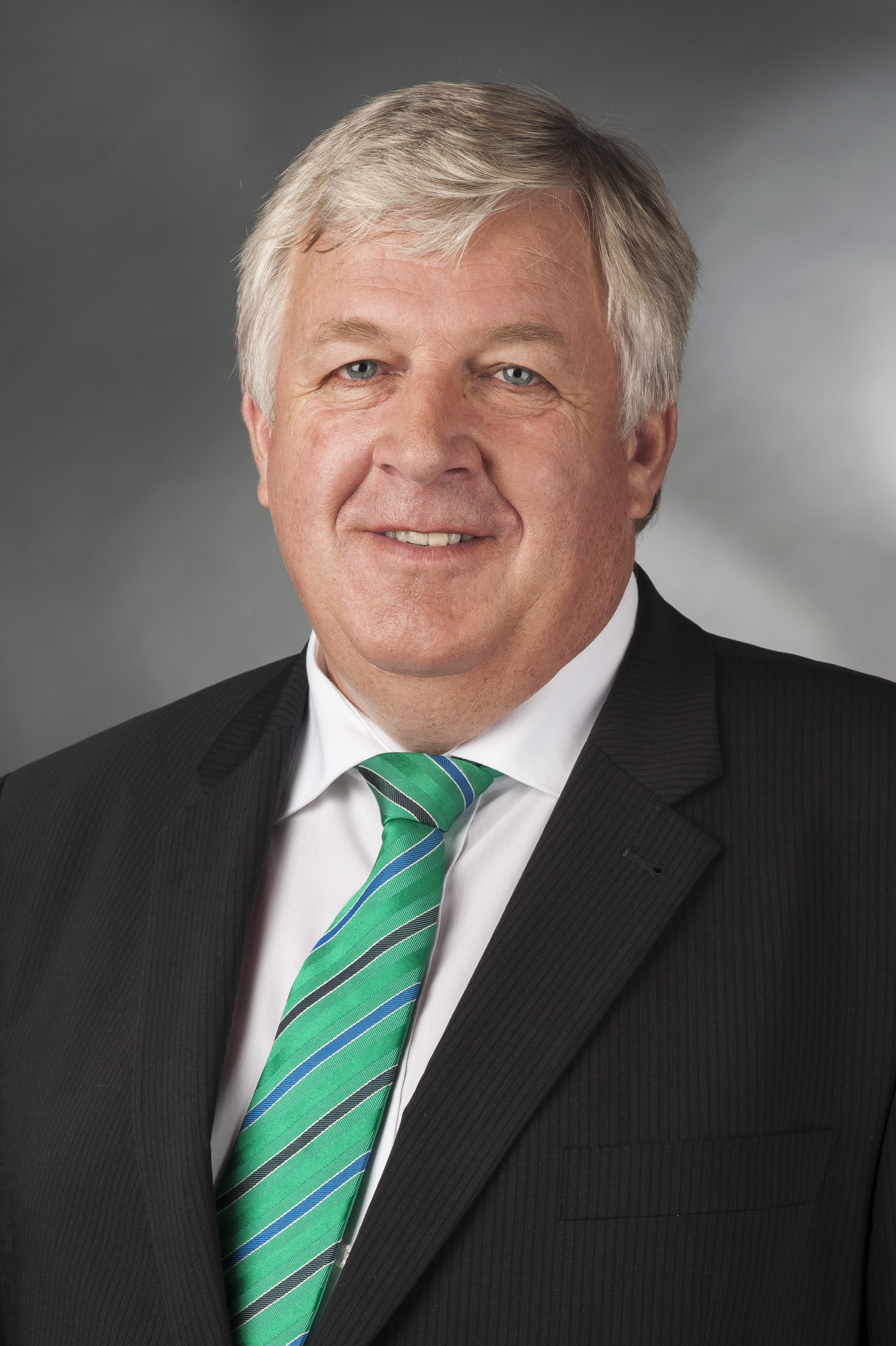
- Kees de Vries in 2014

Member of the Bundestag
- In office 2013–2021

Personal details
- Born: 30 August 1955 Nibbixwoud, Netherlands
- Died: 13 October 2025 (aged 70) Zerbst, Saxony-Anhalt, Germany
- Party: CDU

Kees de Vries (30 August 1955 – 13 October 2025) was a German politician of the Christian Democratic Union (CDU) who served as a member of the Bundestag from the state of Saxony-Anhalt from 2013 until 2021.

== Political career ==
De Vries became a member of the Bundestag after the 2013 German federal election. He was a member of the Committee for Food and Agriculture. De Vries did not stand for re-election in the 2021 German federal election.
