= Katrin Budde =

German politician (born 1965)

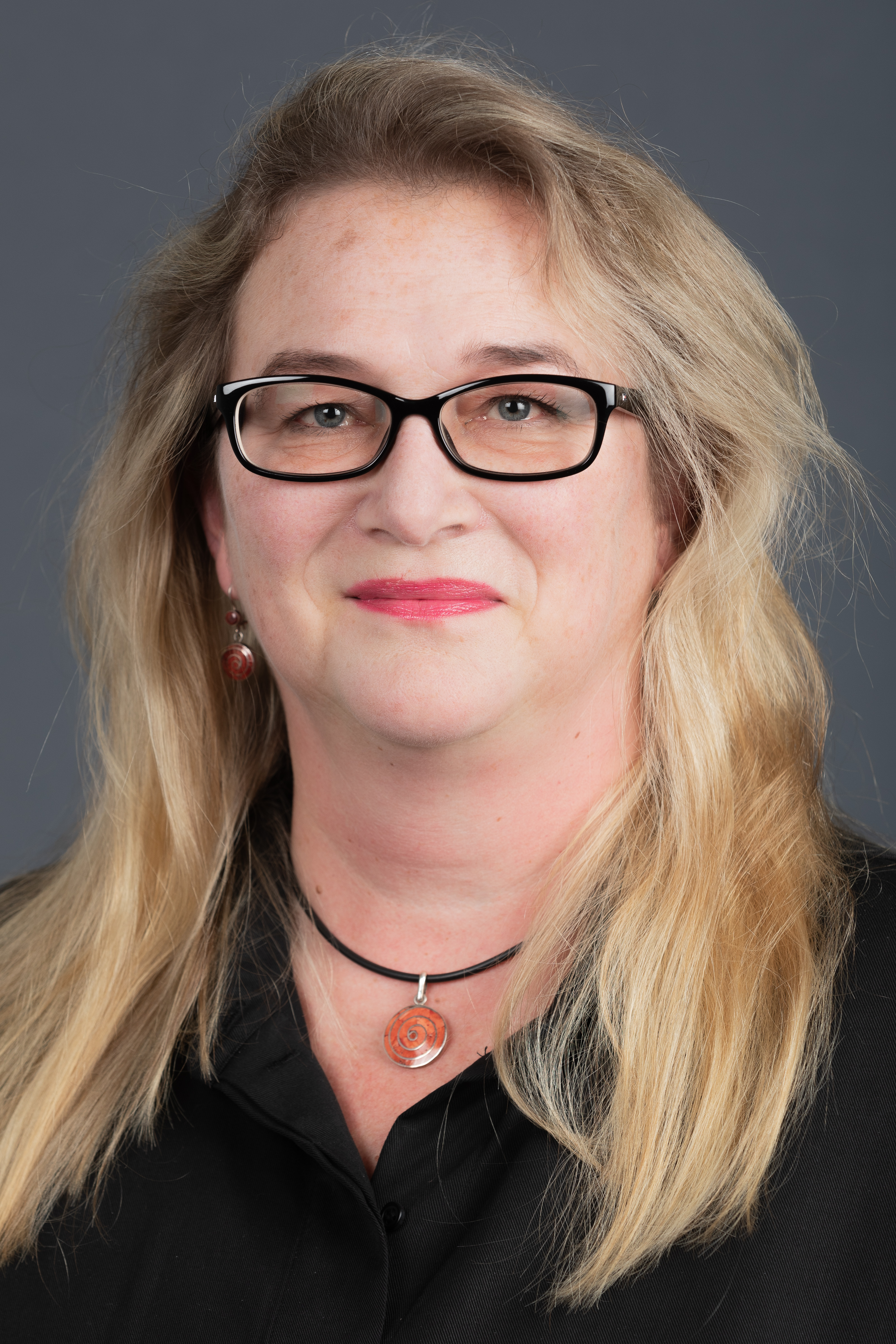
- Budde in 2020

Member of the Bundestag
- In office 2017–2025

Personal details
- Born: 13 April 1965 (age 61) Magdeburg, East Germany (now Germany)
- Party: SPD
- Education: Technical University Magdeburg

Katrin Budde (born 13 April 1965) is a German politician of the Social Democratic Party (SPD), who served as a member of the Bundestag from the state of Saxony-Anhalt from 2017 to 2025.

== Early life and career ==
After graduating from high school in 1983, Budde started an internship at the former VEB Schwermaschinenbau Karl Liebknecht in Magdeburg. From 1984 to 1989, she studied at the Technical University Magdeburg (from 1987 Technical University), where she graduated as an engineer for work design. Subsequently, she worked as a research assistant at VEB FER (research, development, rationalisation) until 1990.

== Political career ==
=== Career in state politics ===
From 1990 to 2017 Budde was a member of the State Parliament of Saxony-Anhalt. From 2009 to 2016, she also served as chairwoman of the SPD in Saxony-Anhalt; she resigned from that position following the party's defeat in the 2016 state elections.

Budde co-chaired the SPD’s national conventions in Berlin (2011) Hanover (2012) and Augsburg (2013).

=== Member of the German Parliament, 2017–2025 ===
Budde became a member of the Bundestag in the 2017 German federal election, representing the Mansfeld district. In parliament, she was the chairwoman of the Committee on Cultural Affairs and Media and a member of the Defense Committee. In addition to her committee assignments, she served as deputy chairwoman of the German-Swiss Parliamentary Friendship Group.

Ahead of the 2021 elections, the SPD’s leadership in Saxony-Anhalt selected Budde to lead the party’s campaign; at a party convention, however, Karamba Diaby was elected to spearhead the campaign, with Budde only coming second.

Within the SPD parliamentary group, Budde belonged to the Parliamentary Left, a left-wing movement, before moving to the Seeheim Circle in 2022.

In July 2024, Budde announced that she would not stand in the 2025 federal elections but instead resign from active politics by the end of the parliamentary term.

== Other activities ==
- Stiftung Archiv der Parteien und Massenorganisationen der DDR (SAPMO), Member of the Board of Trustees (since 2022)
- German Historical Museum (DHM), Alternate Member of the Board of Trustees (since 2020)
- German National Committee for Monument Preservation (DNK), Member of the Board (since 2020)
- Memorial to the Murdered Jews of Europe Foundation, Member of the Board of Trustees (since 2020)
- Federal Foundation for the Reappraisal of the SED Dictatorship, Member of the Board of Trustees
