= Oechlitz =

- Stadtteil of Mücheln
- Interactive map of Oechlitz
- Location within Germany Location within Saxony-Anhalt
- Coordinates: 51°20′N 11°46′E
- Country: Germany
- State: Saxony-Anhalt
- District: Saalekreis
- Town: Mücheln

Area
  - Total: 11.96 km^{2} (4.62 sq mi)
- Elevation: 141 m (463 ft)

Population (2006-12-31)
  - Total: 562
  - Density: 47.0/km^{2} (122/sq mi)
- Time zone: UTC+01:00 (CET)
  - Summer (DST): UTC+02:00 (CEST)
- Postal codes: 06268
- Dialling codes: 034632

Oechlitz is a village and a former municipality in the district Saalekreis, in Saxony-Anhalt, Germany. Since 1 January 2010, it is part of the town Mücheln. It is located in the federal state of Saxony-Anhalt, in the central part of the country, 180 km southwest of Berlin.
