= Delitz am Berge =

Former municipality in Saxony-Anhalt, Germany

Coordinates: 51°25′N 11°54′E

Delitz am Berge is a former municipality in the Saalekreis district, Saxony-Anhalt, Germany. Since January 2008, it has been part of the town of Bad Lauchstädt.

Karl August Adolf von Krafft (1764-1840), a Prussian general who fought in the Napoleonic Wars, was born in Delitz am Berge.
