= Jan Korte (politician) =

German politician (born 1977)

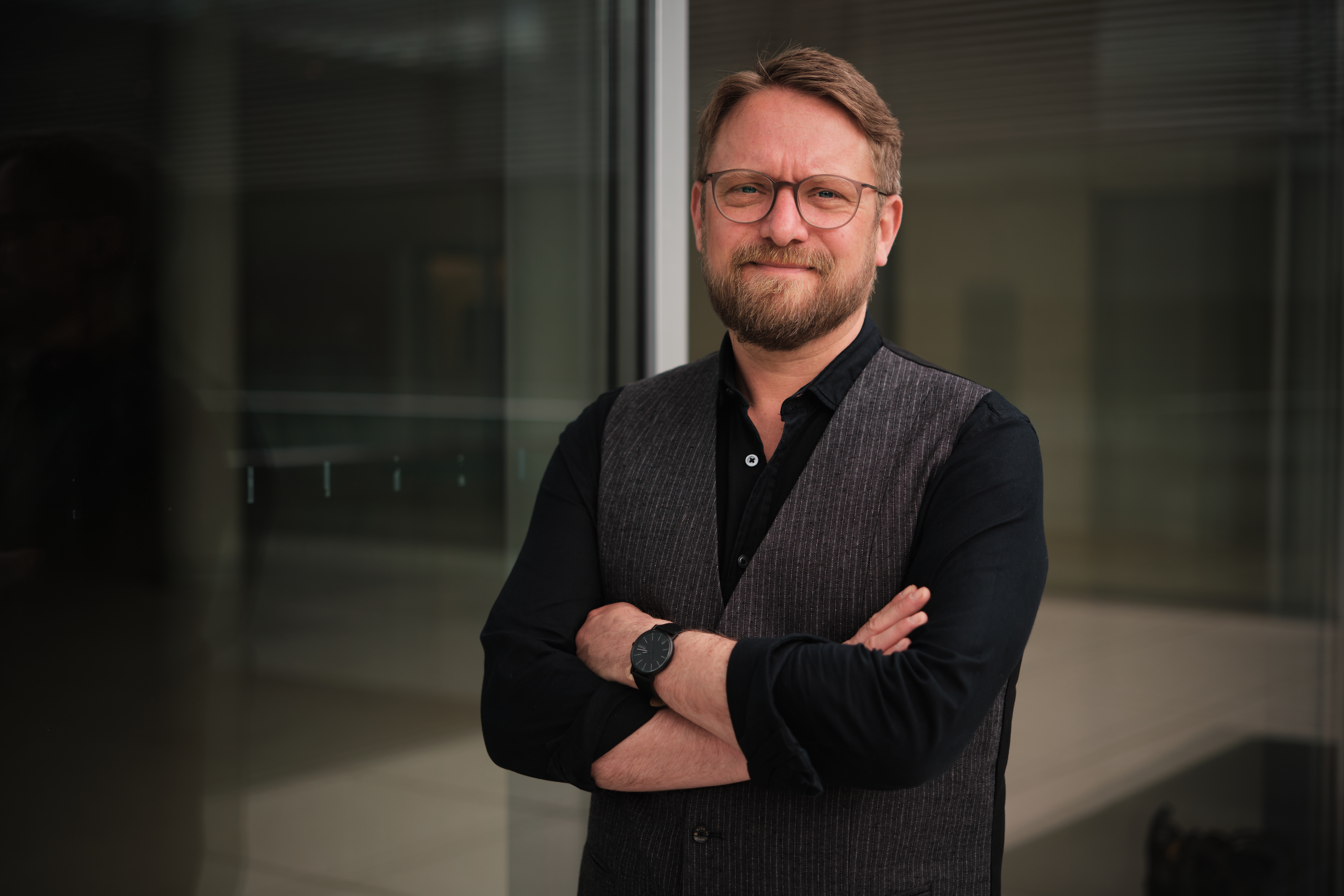
- Jan Korte in 2017

Member of the Bundestag
- Incumbent
- Assumed office 2005

Personal details
- Born: 5 April 1977 (age 49) Osnabrück, West Germany (now Germany)
- Party: The Left
- Children: 2

Jan Korte (born 5 April 1977) is a German politician. Born in Osnabrück, Lower Saxony, he represents The Left. Jan Korte has served as a member of the Bundestag from the state of Saxony-Anhalt since 2005.

== Life ==
After graduating from the Gymnasium Oesede in Georgsmarienhütte in 1997, Korte first completed his civilian service and in 1999 began studying political science, sociology and history at the University of Hanover, which he completed in 2005 as Magister Artium (M.A.). He became member of the bundestag after the 2005 German federal election. He is a member of the Committee on the Verification of Credentials, Immunities and Rules of Procedure. In his group he is the 1st Parliamentary Secretary.

He was re-elected in the 2021 federal election and joined the 20th Bundestag.

Korte announced in August 2024, that he isn't seeking re-election for Bundestag.
