= Uda Heller =

German politician

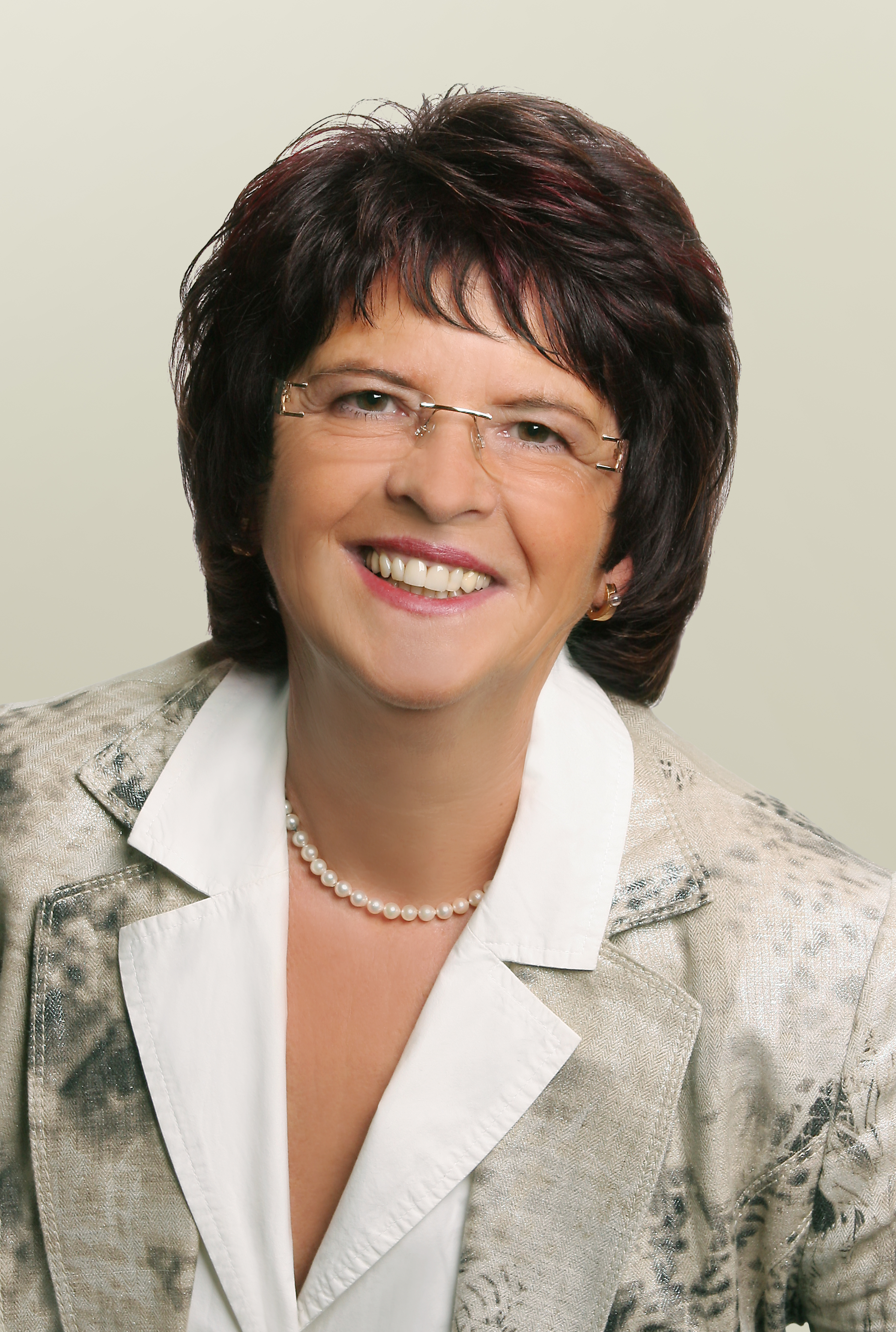
Heller in 2013

Uda Carmen Freia Heller, (née Bischof in 1951) is a German politician of the Christian Democratic Union (CDU), who was a member of the Bundestag.

== Life and career ==
Born on 15 June 1951 in Großengottern, she worked in and studied Food engineering after finishing Polytechnic Secondary School. In 1973, she acquired an Engineer's degree and married. In 1985, she founded a company in Kelbra with her husband. She has two sons.

== Political work ==
In 1987, Heller joined the East German CDU. From 1998 to 2010, she served as the deputy chairwoman of the Saxony-Anhalt state association of the CDU. From 2002 to 2009 and from 2013 to 2016 she was a member of the German Bundestag.

== Honours ==
- 2010: Bundesverdienstkreuz
