= 2016 Saxony-Anhalt state election =

German state election

- 13 March 2016

All 87 seats in the Landtag of Saxony-Anhalt 44 seats needed for a majority
- Turnout: 1,122,877 (61.1%) ▲9.9%
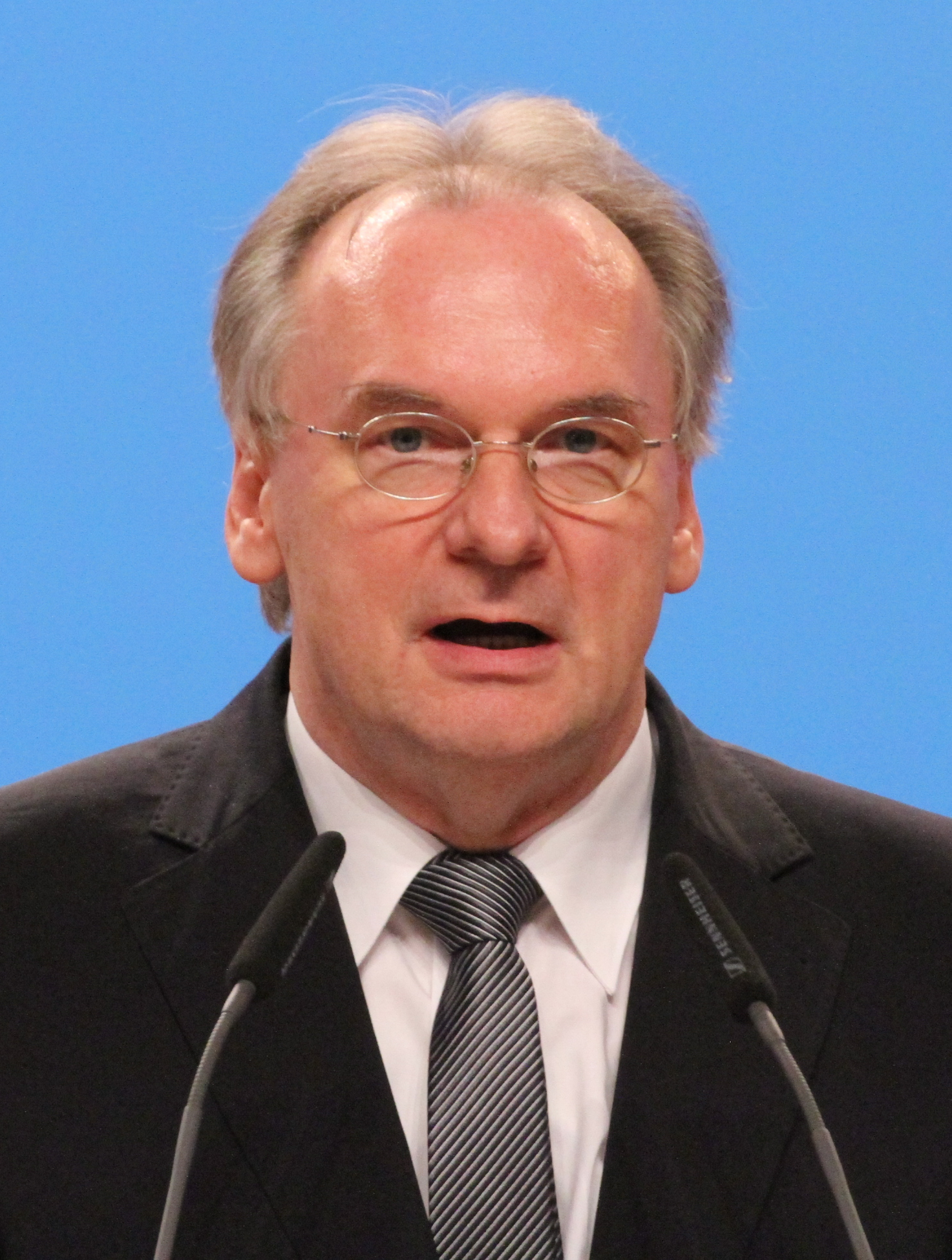

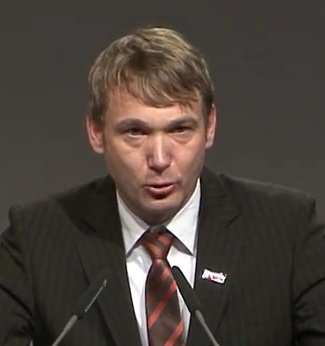

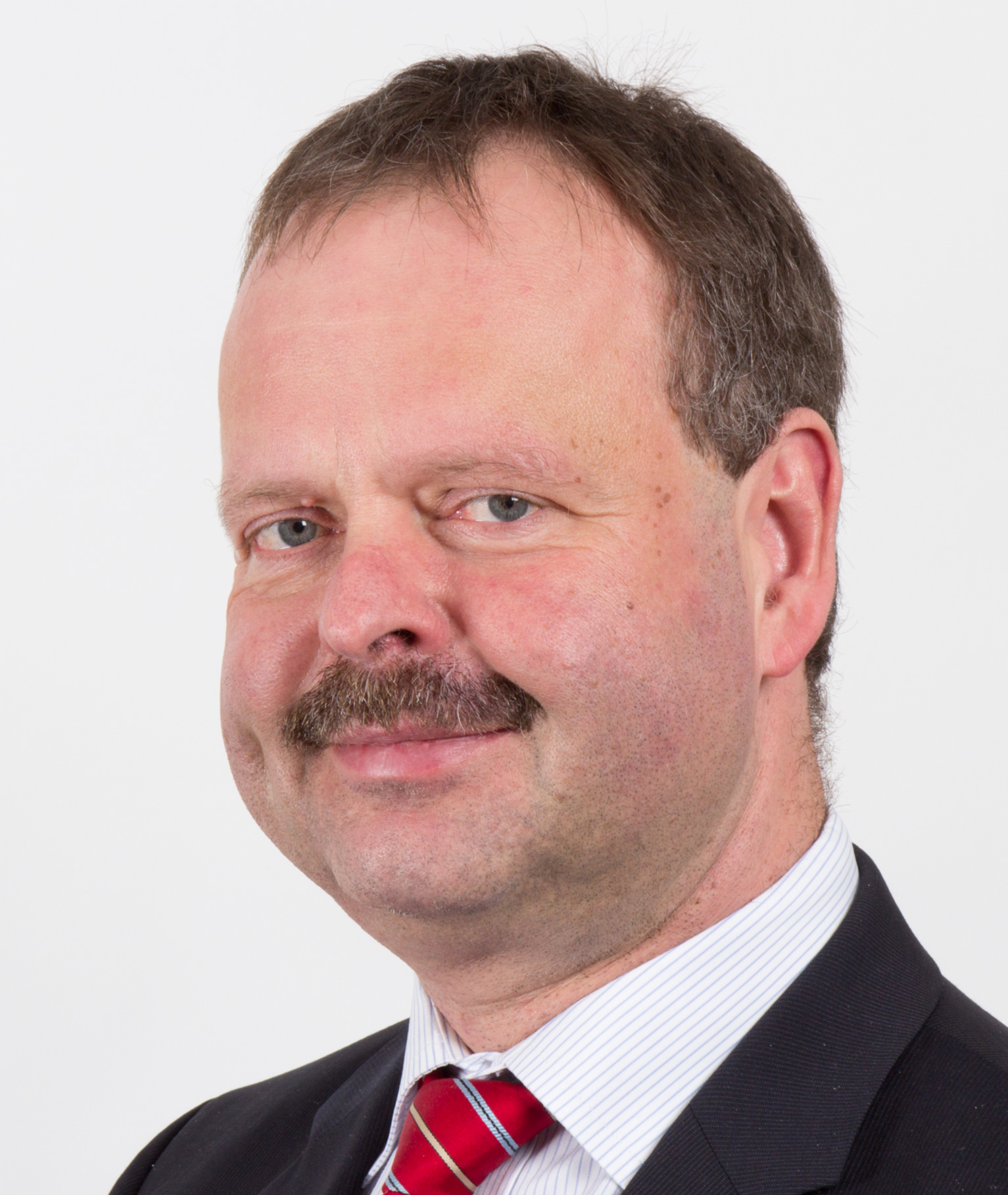

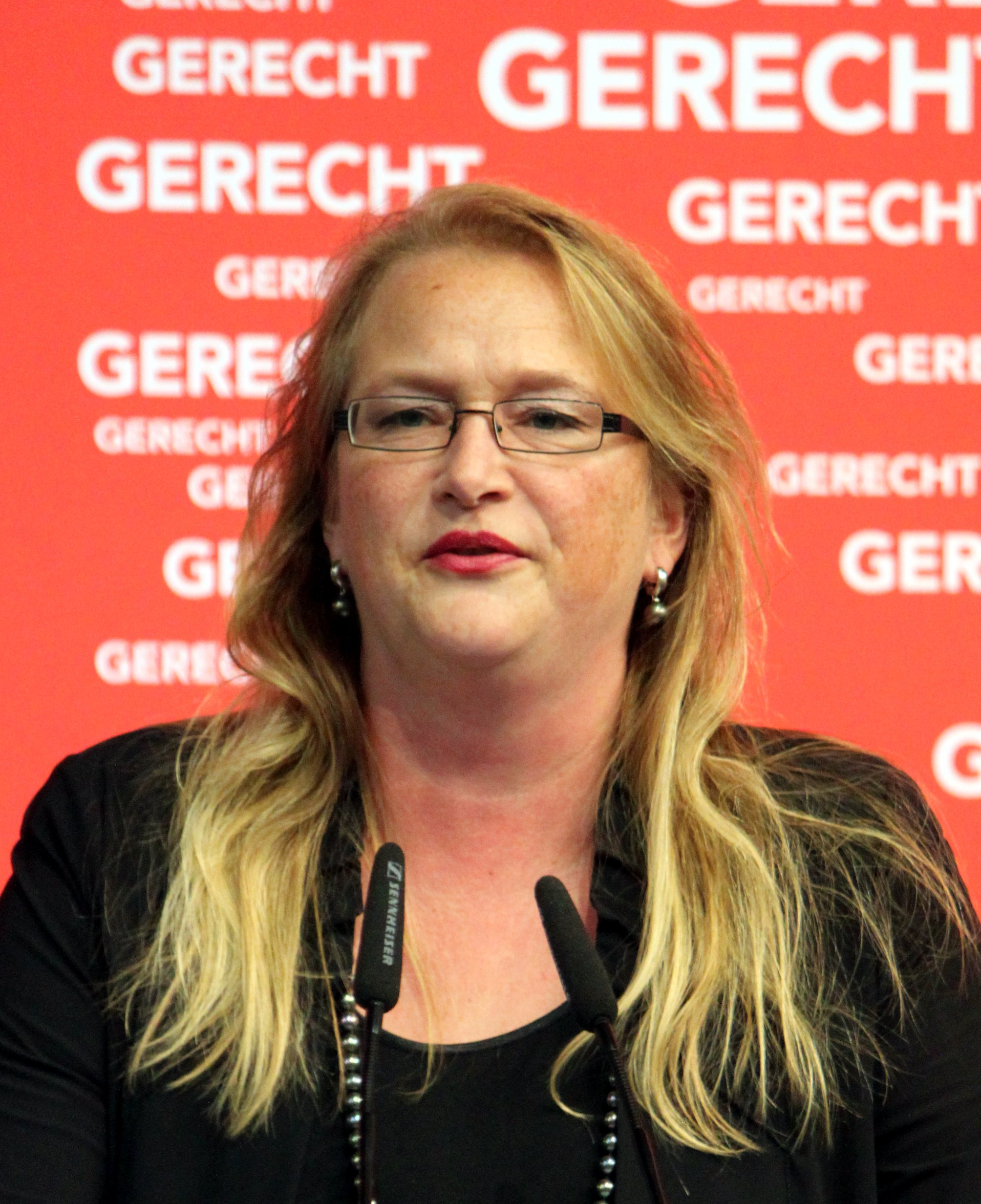

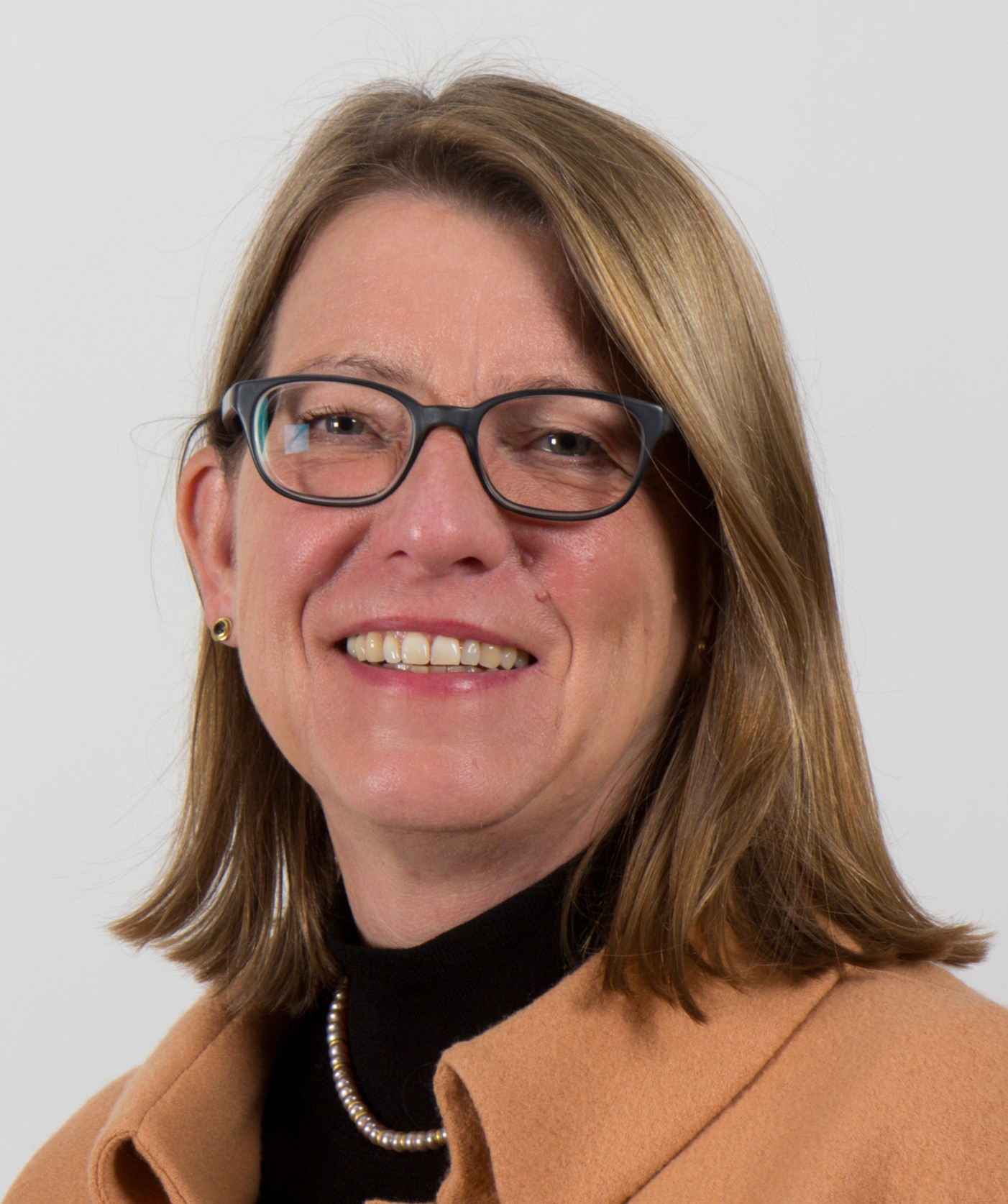
	First party	Second party	Third party
Leader	Reiner Haseloff	André Poggenburg	Wulf Gallert
Party	CDU	AfD	Left
Last election	41 seats, 32.5%	Did not exist	29 seats, 23.7%
Seats won	30	25	16
Seat change	▼11	▲25	▼13
Popular vote	334,139	272,496	183,290
Percentage	29.8%	24.3%	16.3%
Swing	▼2.7%	New party	▼7.4%
	Fourth party	Fifth party
Leader	Katrin Budde	Claudia Dalbert
Party	SPD	Greens
Last election	26 seats, 21.5%	9 seats, 7.1%
Seats won	11	5
Seat change	▼15	▼4
Popular vote	119,368	58,209
Percentage	10.6%	5.2%
Swing	▼10.9%	▼1.9%
- Results for the single-member constituencies
Minister-President before election
Reiner Haseloff
CDU
Elected Minister-President
Reiner Haseloff
CDU

The 2016 Saxony-Anhalt state election to elect the members of the seventh Landtag of Saxony-Anhalt was held on 13 March 2016, the same day as the Baden-Württemberg state election and Rhineland-Palatinate state election. The incumbent grand coalition of the Christian Democratic Union (CDU) and Social Democratic Party (SPD) led by Minister-President Reiner Haseloff lost its majority.

Following the 2015 European migrant crisis, the Alternative for Germany (AfD) debuted at 24.3%, with every other parliamentary party recording losses, particularly the SPD and The Left.

The CDU subsequently formed a coalition with the SPD and The Greens, which was dubbed the "Kenya coalition". Haseloff was re-elected as Minister-President on 25 April.

== Parties ==
The table below lists parties represented in the 6th Landtag of Saxony-Anhalt.

Name		Ideology	Leader(s)	2011 result	
Name		Ideology	Leader(s)	Votes (%)	Seats
CDU	Christian Democratic Union of Germany; Christlich Demokratische Union Deutschlands	Christian democracy	Reiner Haseloff	32.5%	41 / 105
Linke	The Left; Die Linke	Democratic socialism	Wulf Gallert	23.7%	29 / 105
SPD	Social Democratic Party of Germany; Sozialdemokratische Partei Deutschlands	Social democracy	Katrin Budde	21.5%	26 / 105
Grüne	Alliance 90/The Greens; Bündnis 90/Die Grünen	Green politics	Claudia Dalbert	7.1%	9 / 105

== Opinion polling ==
Polling firm	Fieldwork date	Sample size	CDU	Linke	SPD	Grüne	FDP	AfD	Others	Lead
2016 state election	13 Mar 2016	–	29.8	16.3	10.6	5.2	4.9	24.3	9.0	5.5
Forschungsgruppe Wahlen	7–10 Mar 2016	1,096	32	21	14	5	4.5	18	5.5	11
Forsa	2–8 Mar 2016	1,001	30	20	17	5	5	18	5	10
INSA	1–5 Mar 2016	1,000	29	20	15.5	6	4	19	6.5	9
Forschungsgruppe Wahlen	29 Feb–3 Mar 2016	1,027	32	20	15	5	4	17	7	12
Infratest dimap	29 Feb–2 Mar 2016	1,001	31.0	21.0	15.0	5.5	4.5	19.0	4.0	10.0
uniQma	19–29 Feb 2016	1,008	30	19	18	5	4	17	7	11
INSA	25–27 Feb 2016	1,001	29.5	20	17	5	5	17	6.5	9.5
INSA	19–20 Feb 2016	1,000	30	21	16	5	4	17	7	9
Infratest dimap	10–13 Feb 2016	1,001	32	20	18	5	4	17	4	12
Forschungsgruppe Wahlen	11–13 Jan 2016	1,003	33	19	19	5	3	15	5	14
INSA	25 Nov–3 Dec 2015	1,004	35	23	15.5	6	3	13.5	4	12
Infratest dimap	8–12 Sep 2015	1,001	34	26	21	7	–	5	7	8
GMS	19–26 Jun 2015	1,008	35	21	21	6	4	6	7	14
Infratest dimap	9–14 Aug 2013	1,000	39	22	21	7	2	–	9	17
2011 state election	20 Mar 2011	–	32.5	23.7	21.5	7.1	3.8	–	11.3	8.8

View source data.

== Election result ==
The actual result was significantly different from what prior opinion polling indicated. In comparison to the late-campaign polls, the AfD scored approximately 6% higher, while The Left and SPD each scored around 5% lower. The Left were expected to suffer only small losses, but instead achieved their worst result since 1990. This made AfD the clear second-place finisher, in contrast to polling which predicted The Left would remain the second largest party. The SPD, who were already projected to achieve their worst ever result in the state, suffered a catastrophic result, losing over half their voteshare and barely reaching 10%. The Greens narrowly returned to the Landtag, while the FDP fell barely 1,600 votes short of the 5% threshold. Minor parties performed better than expected, with 9% of votes going to them, compared to the 5–6% predicted.

Summary of the 13 March 2016 election results for the Landtag of Saxony-Anhalt
Party	Votes	%	+/-	Seats	+/-	Seats %
Christian Democratic Union (CDU)	334,139	29.8	▼2.7	30	▼11	34.5
Alternative for Germany (AfD)	272,496	24.3	New	25	New	28.7
The Left (Linke)	183,290	16.3	▼7.4	16	▼13	18.4
Social Democratic Party (SPD)	119,368	10.6	▼10.9	11	▼15	12.6
Alliance 90/The Greens (Grüne)	58,209	5.2	▼1.9	5	▼4	5.7
Free Democratic Party (FDP)	54,565	4.9	▲1.1	0	±0	0
Free Voters (FW)	24,269	2.2	▼0.6	0	±0	0
National Democratic Party (NPD)	21,230	1.9	▼2.7	0	±0	0
Human Environment Animal Protection Party (Tierschutz)	16,611	1.5	▼0.1	0	±0	0
Animal Protection Alliance	11,653	1.0	New	0	New	0
Others	27,047	2.4		0	±0	0
Total	1,122,877	100.0		87	▼18	
Voter turnout		61.1	▲9.9			

Popular Vote
CDU	29.76%
AfD	24.27%
DIE LINKE	16.32%
SPD	10.63%
GRÜNE	5.18%
FDP	4.86%
Other	8.98%

Landtag seats
CDU	34.48%
AfD	28.74%
DIE LINKE	18.39%
SPD	12.64%
GRÜNE	5.75%

Results maps by party for the second vote, broken down by district:
Christian Democratic Union

Alternative for Germany

The Left

Social Democratic Party

== Results by District ==
Salzwedel
Party	Candidate	Constituency			Regional		
Party	Candidate	Votes	%	±%	Votes	%	±%
Christian Democratic Union (CDU)	Carsten Borchert	6,882	33.6	▲2.8	6,379	31.0	▲2.3
Alternative for Germany (AfD)	Stephan Botkus	4,471	21.9	new	4,488	21.8	new
The Left (Linke)	Andreas Höppner	3,591	17.6	▼11.9	3,592	17.5	▼9.1
Social Democratic Party (SPD)	Jana Schweizer	3,156	15.4	▼5.5	2,674	13.0	▼9.1
Alliance 90/The Greens (Grüne)	Christian Franke	1,165	5.7	▼1.6	1,320	6.4	▼2.2
Independent	Sabine Danicke	1,189	5.8	new			
Free Democratic Party (FDP)					748	3.6	▼1.8
National Democratic Party (NPD)					284	1.4	▼2.4
Human Environment Animal Protection Party (Tierschutz)					259	1.3	▼0.1
Free Voters (FW)					193	0.9	▼1.0

Gardelegen-Klötze
Party	Candidate	Constituency			Regional		
Party	Candidate	Votes	%	±%	Votes	%	±%
Christian Democratic Union (CDU)	Uwe Harms	6,353	30.5	▼3.4	6,837	32.6	▲0.3
Alternative for Germany (AfD)	Thomas Korell	5,014	24.0	new	4,591	21.9	new
Social Democratic Party (SPD)	Jürgen Barth	3,772	18.1	▼4.7	2,752	13.1	▼9.9
The Left (Linke)	Kay Grahmann	3,354	18.1	▼4.7	3,302	15.7	▼8.6
Alliance 90/The Greens (Grüne)	Mirko Wolff	1,219	5.8	▲0.1	977	4.7	▼1.5
Free Democratic Party (FDP)	Norbert Ungar	1,144	5.5	▼1.1	974	4.6	0
National Democratic Party (NPD)					332	1.6	▼3.3
Human Environment Animal Protection Party (Tierschutz)					286	1.4	▲0.2
Free Voters (FW)					260	1.2	▼0.3

Havelberg-Osterburg
Party	Candidate	Constituency			Regional		
Party	Candidate	Votes	%	±%	Votes	%	±%
Christian Democratic Union (CDU)	Christ Schulenburg	8,656	40.1	▼1.7	7,562	33.2	▼1.7
The Left (Linke)	Jenny Schulz	5,892	27.3	▼1.6	4,123	18.1	▼9.4
Alternative for Germany (AfD)					5,524	24.2	new
Social Democratic Party (SPD)	Ralf Bergmann	3,535	16.4	▼1.5	2,468	10.8	▼9.9
Free Democratic Party (FDP)	Klaus-Dieter Liebsch	2,184	10.1	▲7.6	886	3.9	▲1.2
Alliance 90/The Greens (Grüne)	David Elsholz	1,335	6.2	▲1.0	869	3.8	▼1.8
Free Voters (FW)					302	1.3	▼0.3
National Democratic Party (NPD)					244	1.1	▼3.1
Human Environment Animal Protection Party (Tierschutz)					196	0.9	▼0.4

Stendal
Party	Candidate	Constituency			Regional		
Party	Candidate	Votes	%	±%	Votes	%	±%
Christian Democratic Union (CDU)	Hardy Peter Güssau	6,640	32.4	▼4.5	6,723	30.8	▼3.1
Alternative for Germany (AfD)					5,459	25.0	new
The Left (Linke)	Mario Blasche	5,446	26.6	▼0.8	4,123	18.1	▼9.4
Social Democratic Party (SPD)	Juliane Kleemann	4,174	20.4	▼5.0	2,580	11.8	▼10.3
Free Democratic Party (FDP)	Ralf Berlin	2,981	14.5	▲10.7	886	3.9	▲1.2
Alliance 90/The Greens (Grüne)	Dorothea Frederking	1268	6.2	▼0.3	941	4.3	▼1.8
Human Environment Animal Protection Party (Tierschutz)					255	1.2	▼0.6
National Democratic Party (NPD)					229	1.0	▼4.1
Free Voters (FW)					225	1.0	▼0.1

== Outcome ==
The CDU won 30% of the votes and remained the largest party, but faced a strong challenge from the AfD. After the election, Haseloff stated: "The rise which AfD saw in the polls has the name of a city: it's Cologne," referring to the New Year's Eve sexual assaults in Germany. He claimed that "as the Christian Democratic Union here in Saxony-Anhalt, we have done nothing wrong."

According to observers, the only realistic possibility for a coalition government with a majority was one consisting of the CDU, SPD and the Greens, which held a two-seat majority. Other potential majority coalitions were considered unlikely or politically impossible, such as CDU–Left or CDU–AfD. For a broad-based majority, the coalition would have needed to include both the CDU and The Left, which was infeasible.

Another possible option was a minority government "tolerated" by another party or parties which were themselves not part of the government. In this situation, these parties would abstain from the vote for Minister-President, allowing the minority government to be formed with a simple plurality, rather than the typical absolute majority. Such a situation had existed in Saxony-Anhalt between 1994 and 2002, with an SPD minority government supported by The Left. The most likely arrangement in 2016 would have been a minority government of the CDU and SPD with the tolerance of the Greens and/or The Left. Similarly, a CDU–Green coalition could have been tolerated by the SPD and/or The Left. An SPD–Left–Green coalition could be tolerated by the CDU, although this possibility was highly unlikely.

Ultimately, the CDU, SPD, and Greens agreed to form a coalition government together, to the exclusion of The Left. This was dubbed the "Kenya coalition", a reference to the colours of the parties and those of the flag of Kenya. This was the first such coalition formed in Germany. On 25 April 2016, Haseloff was re-elected as Minister-President by the Landtag on the second ballot, in which he won one vote more than the necessary majority.
