= Sebastian Striegel =

German politician (born 1981)

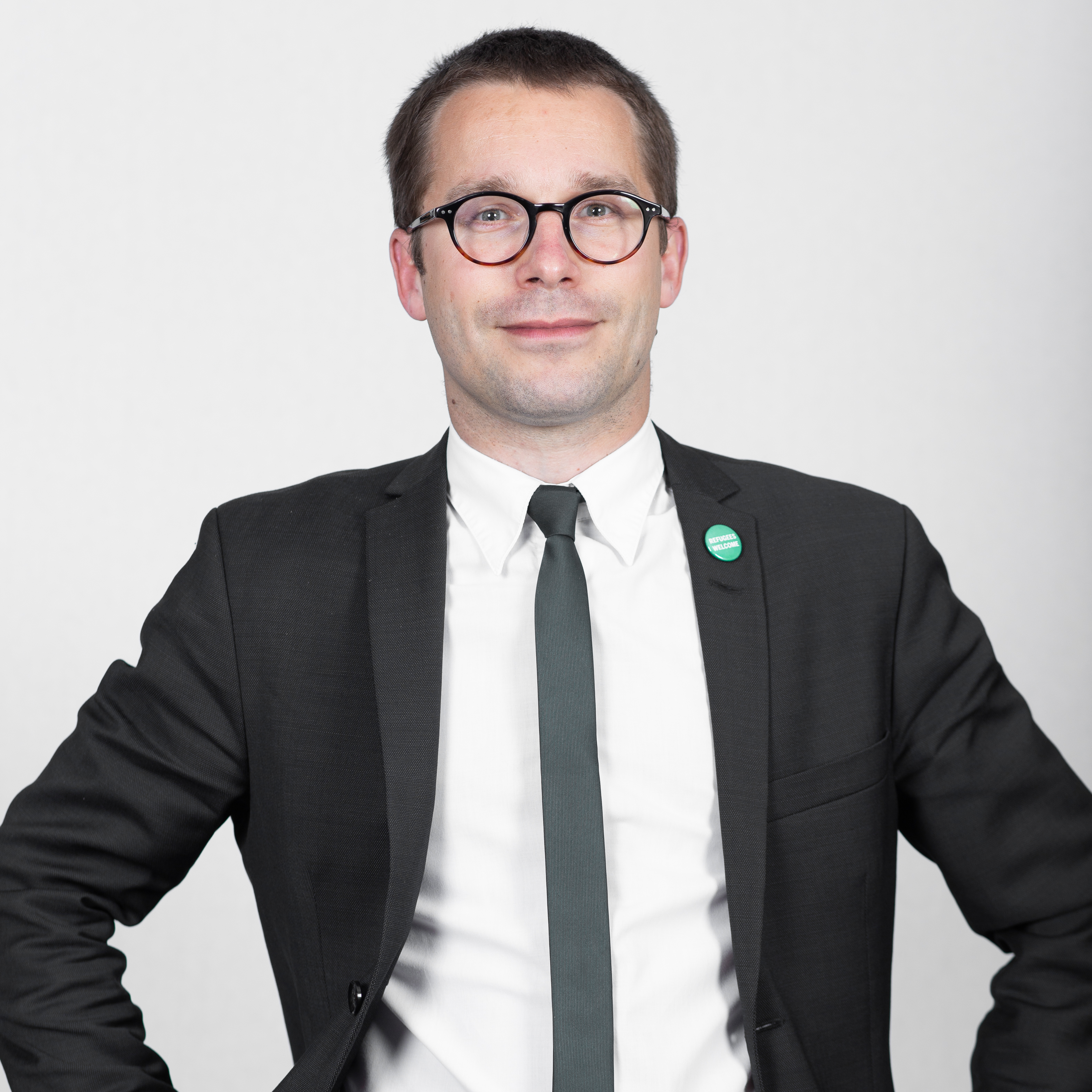
- Striegel in 2018

Member of the Landtag of Saxony-Anhalt
- Incumbent
- Assumed office 19 April 2011

Personal details
- Born: 3 June 1981 (age 44) Halle (Saale)
- Party: Alliance 90/The Greens (since 1998)

Sebastian Striegel (born 3 June 1981 in Halle (Saale)) is a German politician serving as a member of the Landtag of Saxony-Anhalt since 2011. From 2019 to 2021, he served as co-chair of Alliance 90/The Greens in Saxony-Anhalt.
