= Mücheln =

- Town
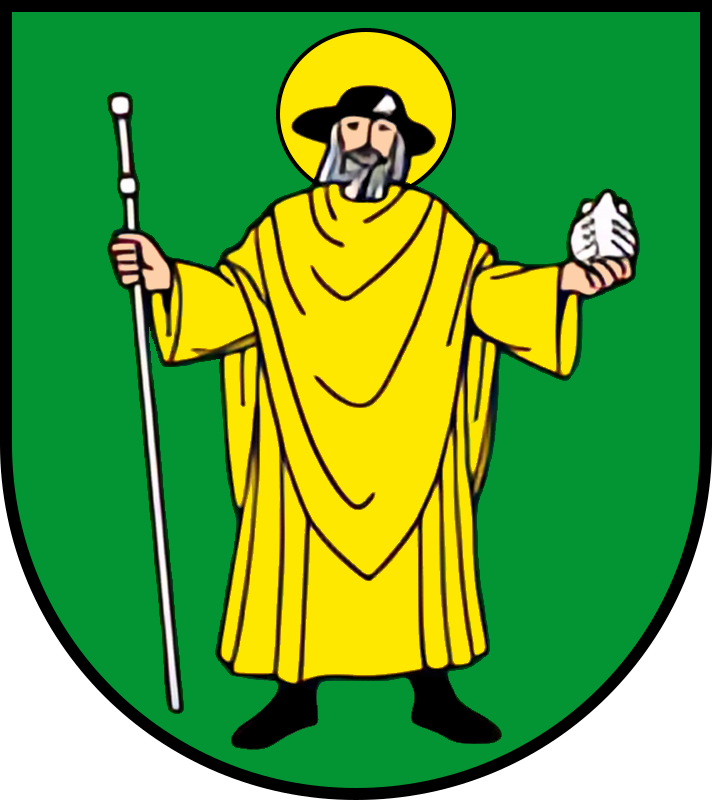
- Coat of arms
- Interactive map of Mücheln
- Location within Germany Location within Saxony-Anhalt
- Coordinates: 51°18′N 11°48′E
- Country: Germany
- State: Saxony-Anhalt
- District: Saalekreis
- Subdivisions: 12

Government
  - Mayor (2018–25): Andreas Marggraf

Area
  - Total: 98.58 km^{2} (38.06 sq mi)
- Elevation: 164 m (538 ft)

Population (2025-12-31)
  - Total: 8,039
  - Density: 81.55/km^{2} (211.2/sq mi)
- Time zone: UTC+01:00 (CET)
  - Summer (DST): UTC+02:00 (CEST)
- Postal codes: 06249, 06255, 06268, 06632
- Dialling codes: 034632, 034633, 034636
- Vehicle registration: SK
- Website: www.muecheln.de

Mücheln (Geiseltal) (German pronunciation: [ˈmʏçl̩n]) is a town in the Saalekreis district, Saxony-Anhalt, Germany.

== Geography ==
Mücheln (Geiseltal) is situated approximately 15 km west of Merseburg and borders Lake Geiseltal to the southwest, west, and northwest.

=== Divisions ===
The town Mücheln consists of Mücheln proper and the following five Ortschaften or municipal divisions:

- Branderoda
- Gröst
- Langeneichstädt
- Oechlitz
- Wünsch

These are all formerly independent municipalities: Branderoda, Gröst, Langeneichstädt and Wünsch were absorbed into Mücheln in 2006, Oechlitz in 2010.

== History ==
First documented evidence of a settlement is in the Hersfeld Abbey tithe register, which was written between 881 und 899. Mücheln (Geiseltal) is included under the name Muchilacha, Mücheln Castle as Muchileburg.

Mücheln (Geiseltal) was awarded town privileges in 1350.

The official name of the town was changed from Mücheln to Mücheln (Geiseltal) in 1936.

== Politics ==
In the run-off election on November 27, 2011, Andreas Marggraf defeated his opponent Steffen Keller with 72.34% of the votes. Marggraf was inaugurated on January 1, 2012. He was re-elected in 2018.
