= Kay-Uwe Ziegler =

German politician

Member of the Bundestag
- Incumbent
- Assumed office German Bundestag in 2021

Personal details
- Born: 27 October 1963 (age 62)
- Party: Alternative for Germany

Kay-Uwe Ziegler (born 27 October 1963) is a German politician for the AfD and since 2021 a member of the Bundestag, the federal diet.

== Life and politics ==
Ziegler was born 1963 in the East German city of Eisenach. Ziegler was directly elected to the Bundestag in 2021.
