= Bad Lauchstädt =

- Town
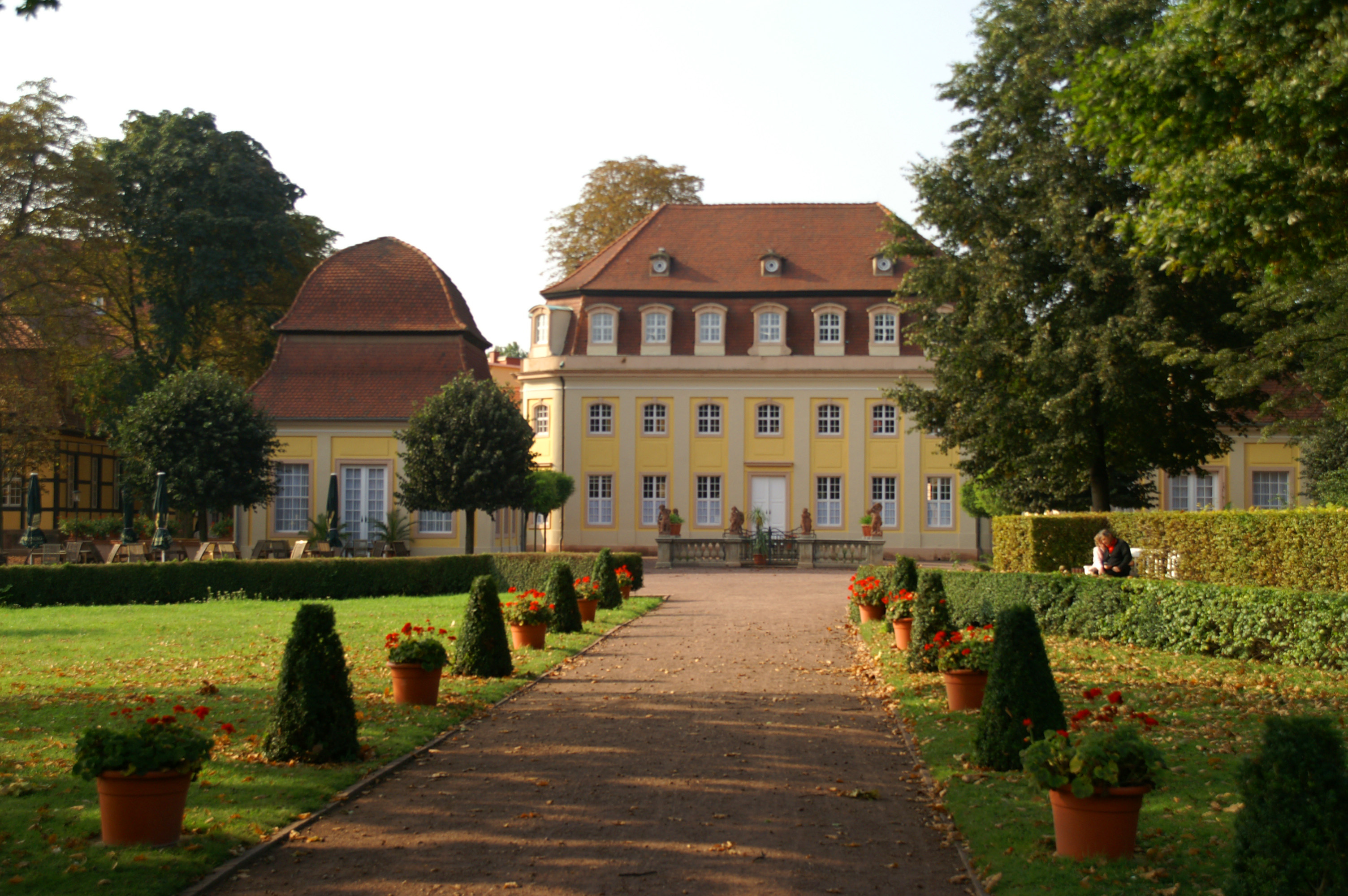

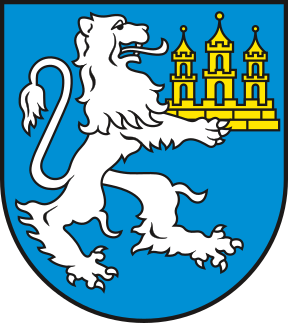
- Coat of arms

- Location of Bad Lauchstädt within Saalekreis district
- Interactive map of Bad Lauchstädt
- Location within Germany Location within Saxony-Anhalt
- Coordinates: 51°22′N 11°50′E
- Country: Germany
- State: Saxony-Anhalt
- District: Saalekreis
- Subdivisions: 6

Government
  - Mayor (2022–29): Christian Runkel (CDU)

Area
  - Total: 85.37 km^{2} (32.96 sq mi)
- Elevation: 124 m (407 ft)

Population (2025-12-31)
  - Total: 8,894
  - Density: 104.2/km^{2} (269.8/sq mi)
- Time zone: UTC+01:00 (CET)
  - Summer (DST): UTC+02:00 (CEST)
- Postal codes: 06246
- Dialling codes: 034635
- Vehicle registration: SK
- Website: www.goethestadt-bad-lauchstaedt.de

Bad Lauchstädt (German pronunciation: [baːt ˈlaʊxʃtɛt]; until 1925 Lauchstädt), officially the Goethe Town of Bad Lauchstädt (German: Goethestadt Bad Lauchstädt), is a town in the district Saalekreis, Saxony-Anhalt, Germany, 13 km southwest of Halle. Population 8,781 (2020).

In January 2008, Bad Lauchstädt incorporated the former municipalities Schafstädt, Delitz am Berge and Klobikau. On 1 January 2010 Milzau was also incorporated, disbanding the Verwaltungsgemeinschaft Bad Lauchstädt. Bad Lauchstädt, Delitz am Berge, Klobikau, Milzau and Schafstädt are now Ortschaften or municipal divisions of the town Bad Lauchstädt.

== History ==
Until 1565, Lauchstädt belonged to the Prince-Bishopric of Merseburg, and then was incorporated into the Electorate of Saxony. In 1657, Lauchstädt was awarded to Christian I, Duke of Saxe-Merseburg, who later (1684) granted the town to his son Philipp, Duke of Saxe-Merseburg-Lauchstädt, upon whose early death in 1690 it was returned to duke Christian. In 1738, upon the extinction of the ducal Saxe-Merseburg line, it was reintegrated into the Electorate of Saxony. Lauchstädt was a popular watering-place in the 18th century, the Saxon dukes often making it their summer residence.

From 1789 to 1811 the Weimar court theatrical company gave performances here of the plays of Friedrich Schiller and Johann Wolfgang von Goethe, an attraction which greatly contributed to the well-being of the town, many in the building now known as the Goethe-Theater. During the 19th century, its industries included malting, vinegar-making and brewing.

== Notable people ==
- August Förster (1828–1889), actor
- Klaus-Jürgen Grünke (born 1951), cyclist
- Carlo Thränhardt (born 1957), high jumper

== Gallery ==
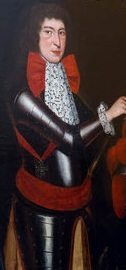
Philipp, Duke of Saxe-Merseburg-Lauchstädt

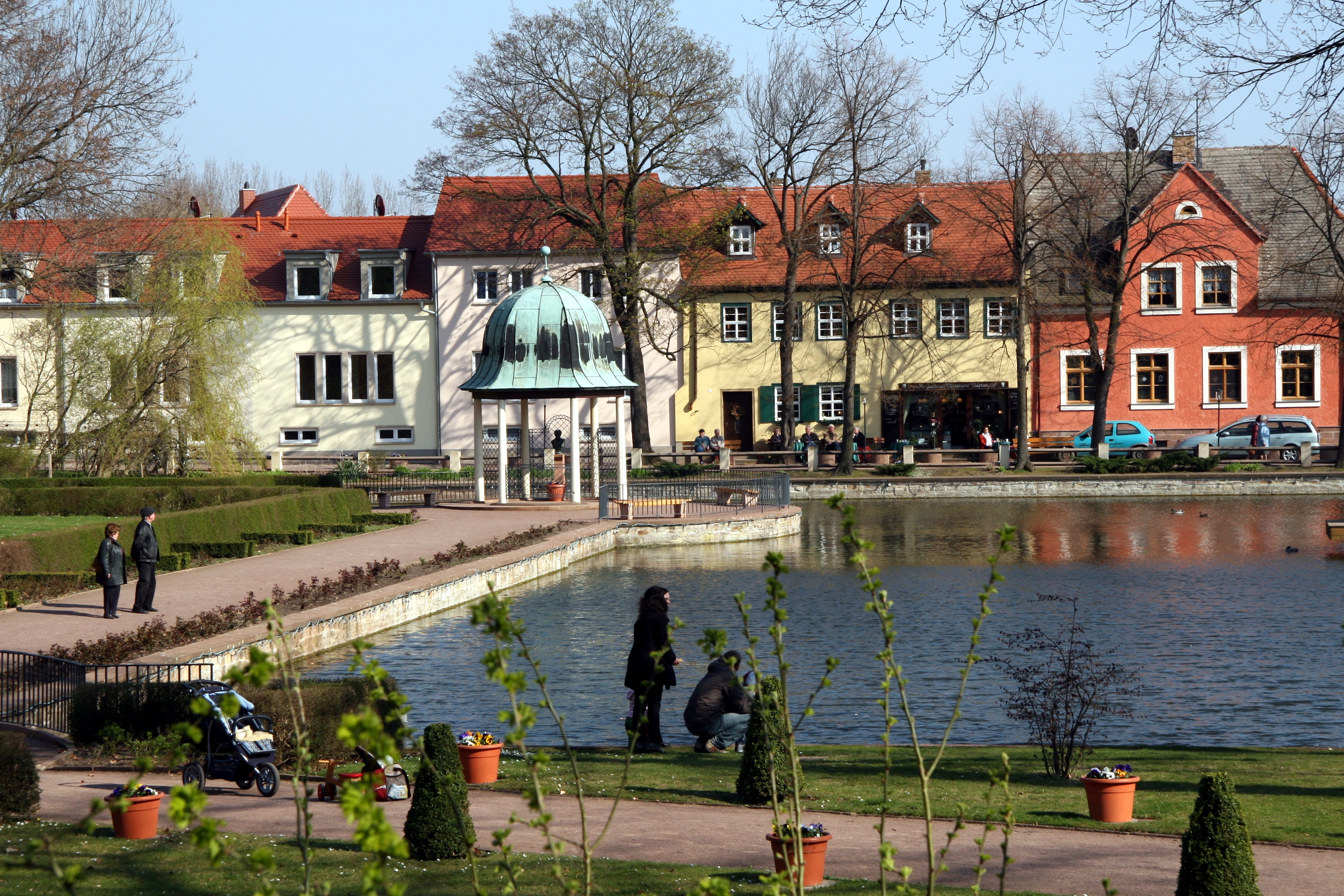
Bad Lauchstädt

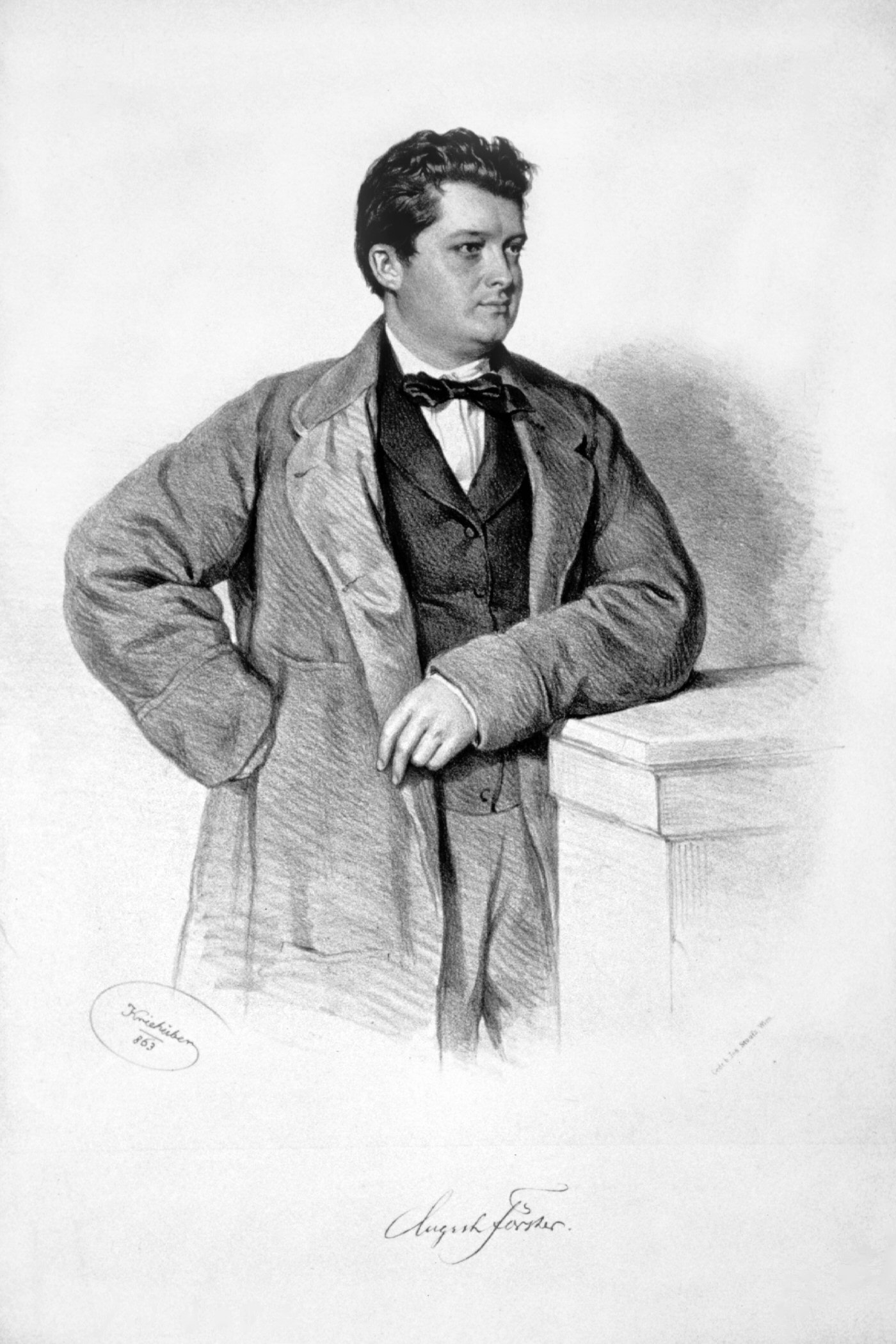
August Förster, 1863
