= House of Wettin =

German noble and royal family

- Country: Belgium, Bulgaria, Germany, Latvia, Lithuania, Poland, Portugal, United Kingdom
- Founded: 10th century
- Founder: Theodoric I
- Current head: Michael, Prince of Saxe-Weimar-Eisenach
- Titles: List: Ernestine branch: (see more); Grand Duke of Saxe-Weimar-Eisenach; King of the Belgians; King of Portugal; King/Queen of the United Kingdom; Tsar of Bulgaria Albertine branch: (see more); King of Saxony; King of Poland; Grand Duke of Lithuania; Duke of Warsaw; Duke of Courland; Duke of Teschen; Grand Master of the Teutonic Order
- Branches: Ernestine branch; Saxe-Weimar-Eisenach; Saxe-Meiningen; Saxe-Coburg and Gotha (Note: known until 1826 as the House of Saxe-Coburg-Saalfeld); Windsor; Saxe-Coburg-Gotha-Koháry; Braganza-Saxe-Coburg and Gotha (extinct); Bulgarian royal family; Saxe-Coburg and Braganza; Belgium; Albertine branch; Saxe-Gessaphe; Saxony

The House of Wettin (German: Haus Wettin) is a dynasty which included Saxon kings, prince-electors, dukes, and counts, who once ruled territories in the present-day German federated states of Saxony, Saxony-Anhalt and Thuringia. The dynasty is one of the oldest in Europe, and its origins can be traced back to the town of Wettin, Saxony-Anhalt. The Wettins gradually rose to power within the Holy Roman Empire. Members of the family became the rulers of several medieval states, starting with the Saxon Eastern March in 1030. Other states they gained were the March of Meissen in 1089, the Landgraviate of Thuringia in 1263, the Palatinate of Saxony in 1350, and the Duchy of Saxe-Wittenberg with the Saxon electoral dignity in 1423.

The family was divided into two ruling lines in 1485 by the Treaty of Leipzig: the senior Ernestine and junior Albertine branches. The Ernestine branch initially held the Electorate of Saxony (1485–1547), and played a key role during the Protestant Reformation, while many ruling monarchs outside Germany were later tied to its cadet branch, the House of Saxe-Coburg and Gotha. The Albertine branch, while initially less prominent, later took over the Electorate of Saxony (1547–1806) and ruled in the Kingdom of Saxony (1806–1918), also giving two monarchs of the Polish–Lithuanian Commonwealth (1697–1763).

Later Agnates of the House of Wettin have, at various times, also ascended the thrones of the United Kingdom, Portugal, Bulgaria, and Belgium. Only the Belgian line retains their throne today.

== Origins: Wettin of Saxony ==
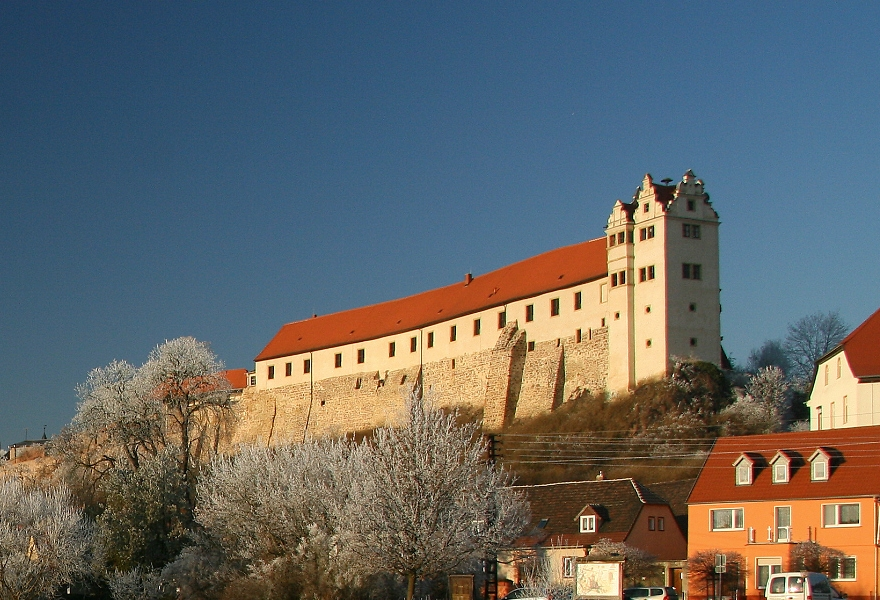
Wettin Castle in Saxony-Anhalt

The oldest member of the House of Wettin who is known for certain is Theodoric I of Wettin, also known as Dietrich, Thiedericus, and Thierry I of Liesgau (died c. 982). He was most probably based in the Liesgau (located at the western edge of the Harz). Around 1000, the family acquired Wettin Castle, which was originally built by the local Slavic tribes (see Sorbs), after which they named themselves. Wettin Castle is located in Wettin in the Hassegau (or Hosgau) on the Saale River. Around 1030, the Wettin family received the Eastern March as a fief.

The prominence of the Wettins in the Slavic Saxon Eastern March (or Ostmark) caused Emperor Henry IV to invest them with the March of Meissen as a fief in 1089. The family advanced over the course of the Middle Ages: in 1263, they inherited the landgraviate of Thuringia (although without Hesse) and in 1423, they were invested with the Duchy of Saxony, centred at Wittenberg, thus becoming one of the prince-electors of the Holy Roman Empire.

== Ernestine and Albertine Wettins ==
The family split into two ruling branches in 1485 when the sons of Frederick II, Elector of Saxony divided the territories hitherto ruled jointly. The elder son Ernest, who had succeeded his father as Prince-elector, received the territories assigned to the Elector (Electorate of Saxony) and Thuringia, while his younger brother Albert obtained the March of Meissen, which he ruled from Dresden. As Albert ruled under the title of "Duke of Saxony", his possessions were also known as Ducal Saxony.

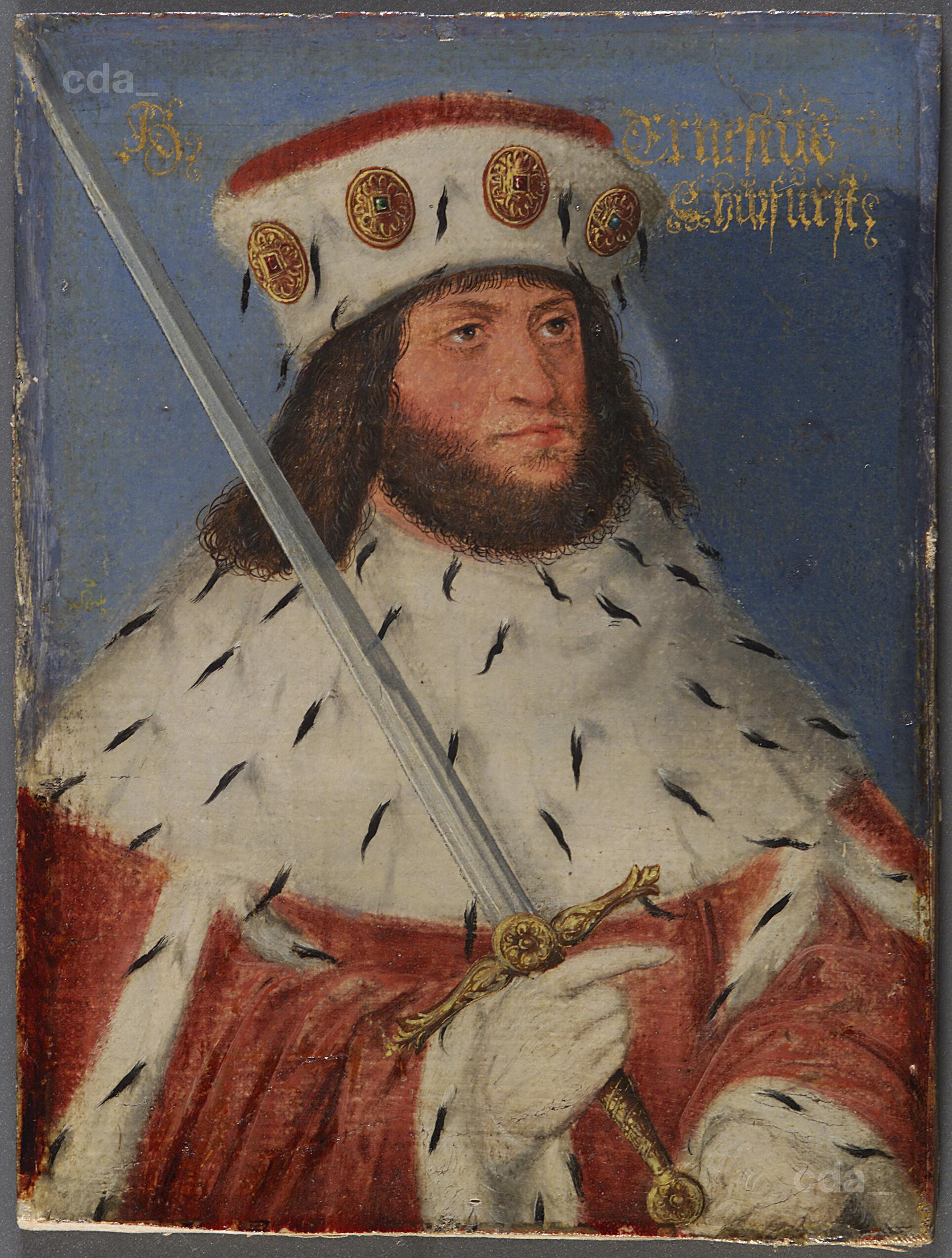
Ernest, Elector of Saxony (1441–1486)

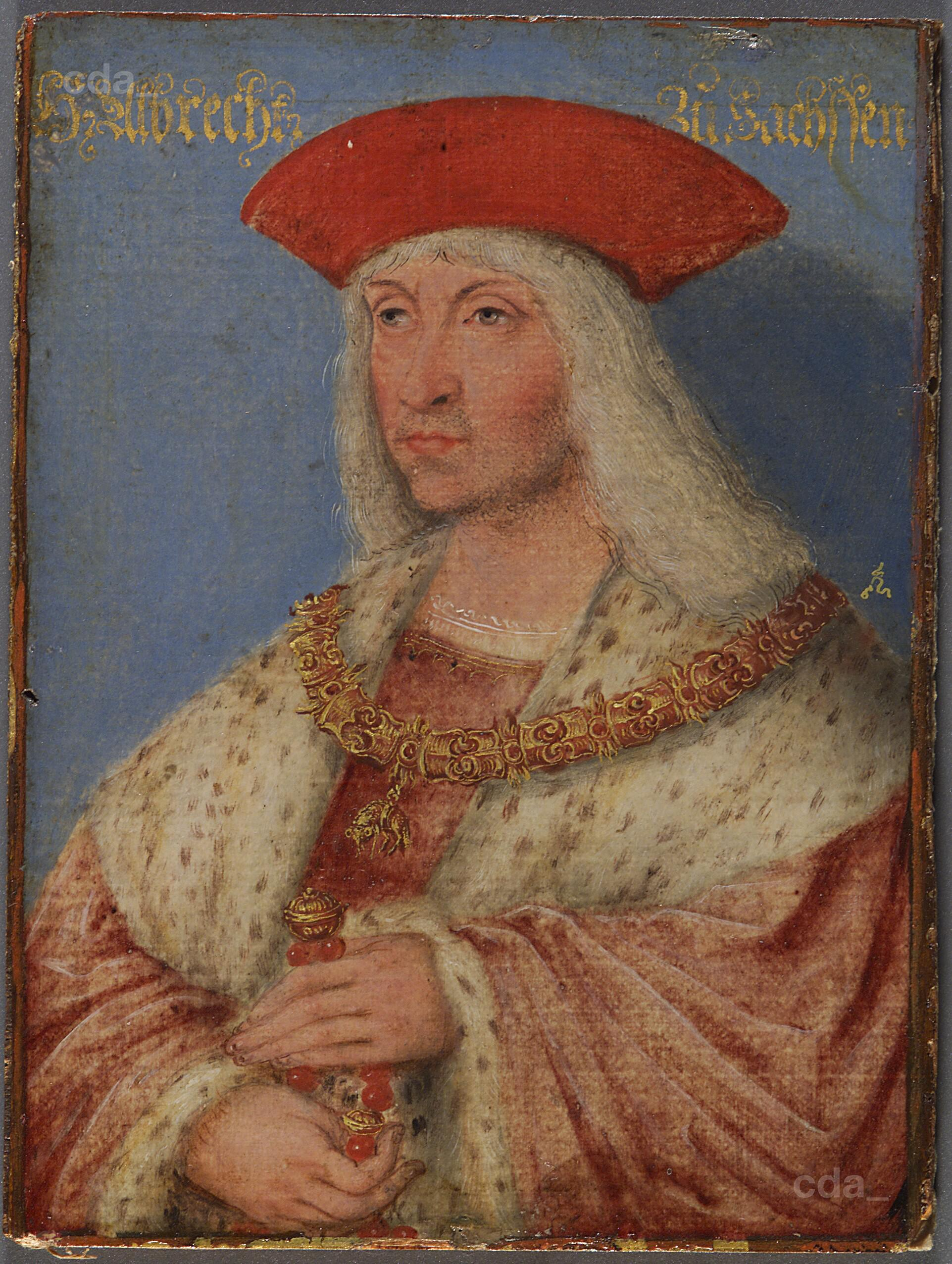
Albert, Duke of Saxony (1443–1500)

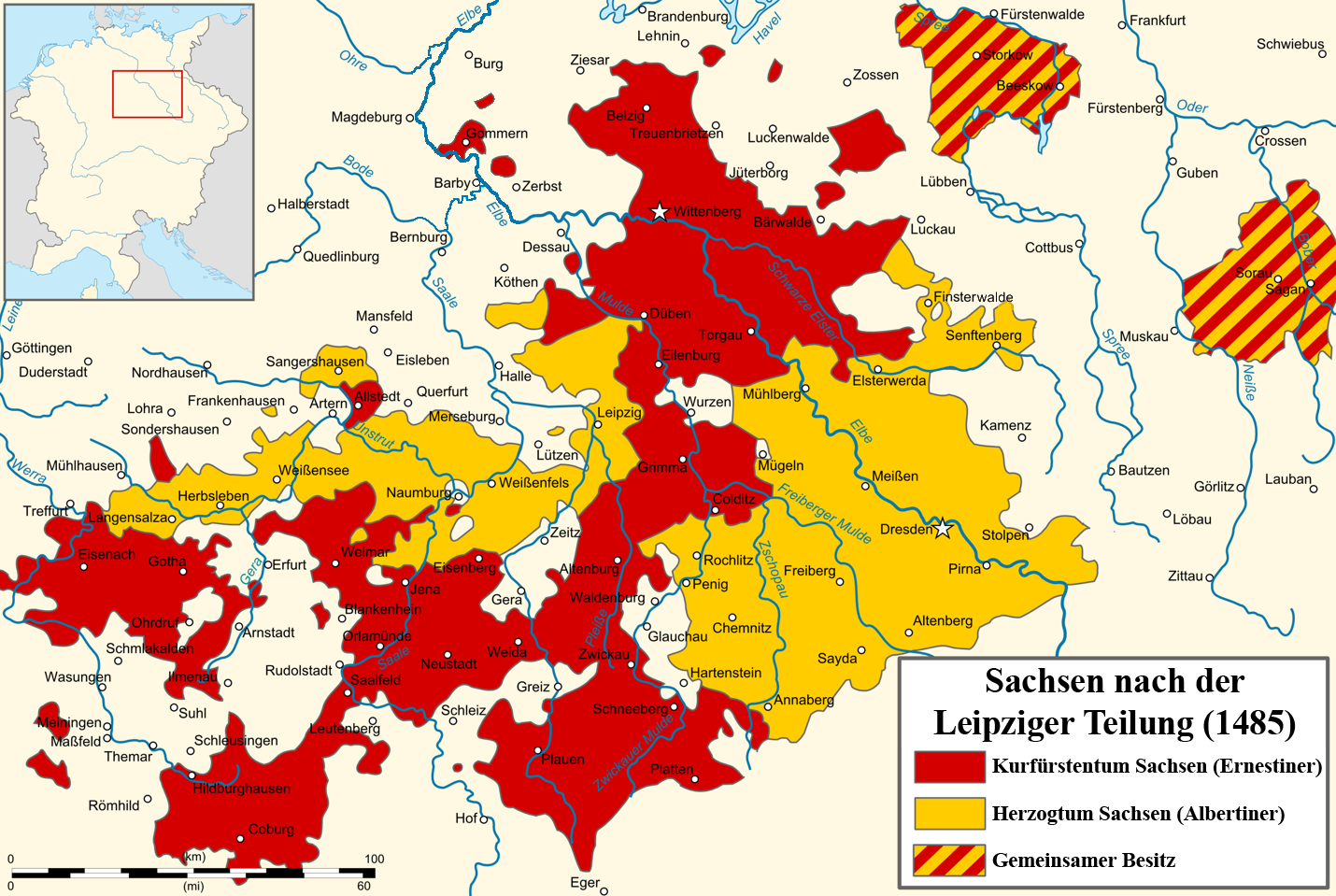
Ernestine (red) and Albertine (yellow) domains upon the Treaty of Leipzig (1485)

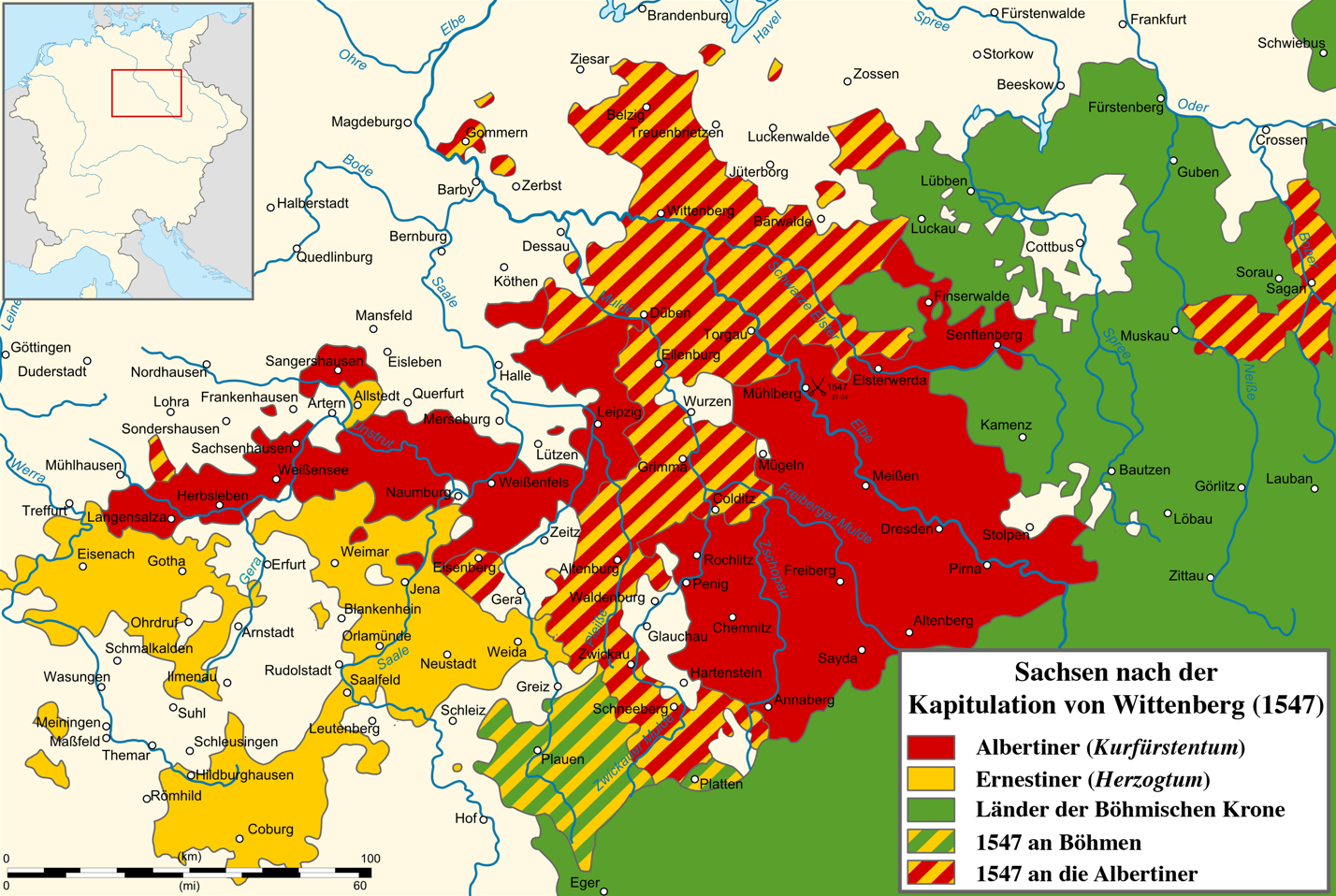
Ernestine (yellow) and Albertine (red) domains upon the Capitulation of Wittenberg (1547)

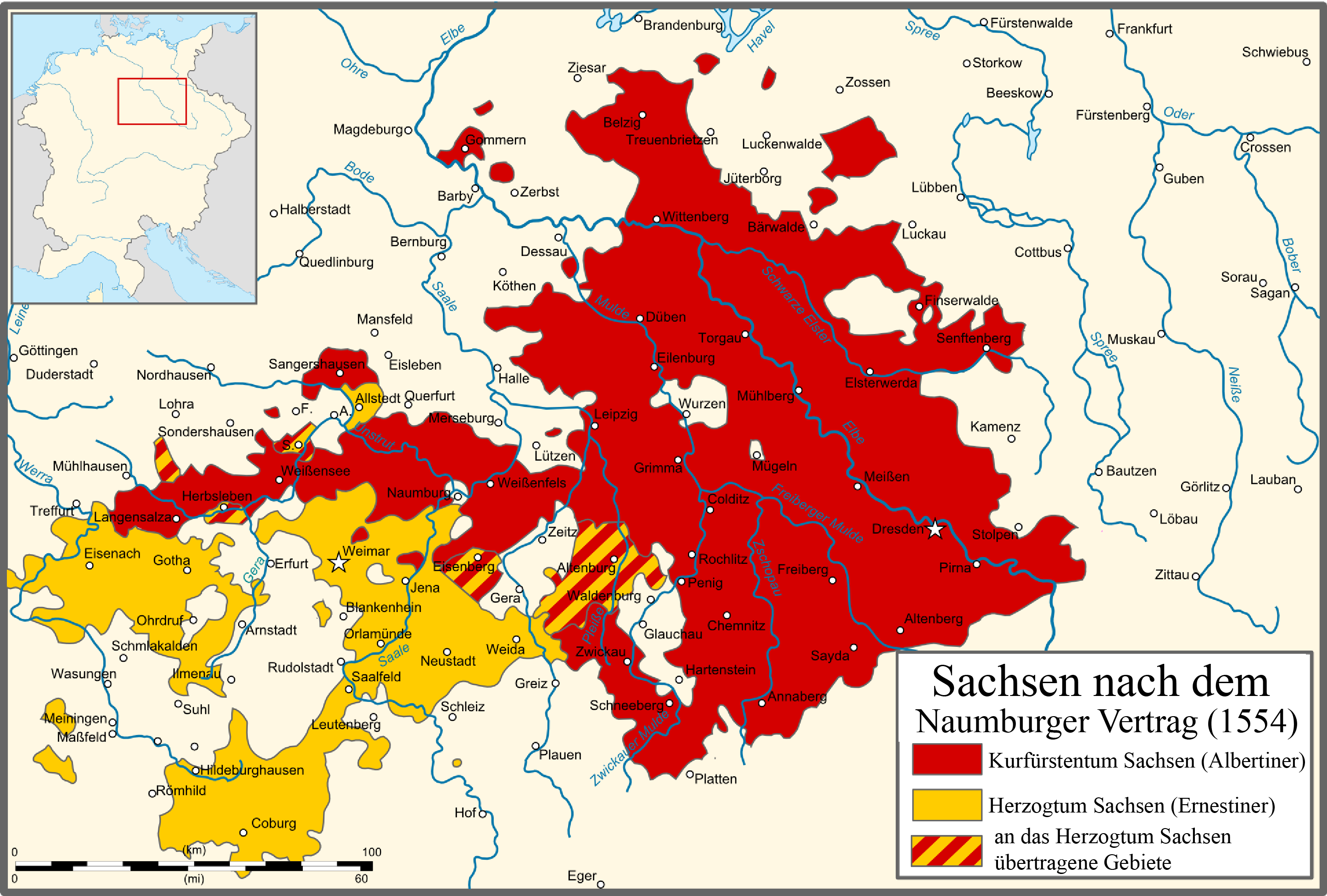
Ernestine (yellow) and Albertine (red) domains upon the Treaty of Naumburg (1554)

=== Ernestines ===
The older Ernestine branch remained predominant until 1547 and played an important role in the beginnings of the Protestant Reformation. Frederick III (Friedrich der Weise) appointed Martin Luther (1512) and Philipp Melanchthon (1518) to the University of Wittenberg, which he had established in 1502.

The Ernestine predominance ended in the Schmalkaldic War (1546/7), which pitted the Protestant Schmalkaldic League against the Emperor Charles V. Although itself Lutheran, the Albertine branch rallied to the Emperor's cause. Charles V had promised Moritz the rights to the electorship. After the Battle of Mühlberg, Johann Friedrich der Großmütige, had to cede territory (including Wittenberg) and the electorship to his cousin Moritz. Although imprisoned, Johann Friedrich was able to plan a new university. It was established by his three sons on 19 March 1548 as the Höhere Landesschule at Jena. On 15 August 1557, Emperor Ferdinand I awarded it the status of university.

The Ernestine line was thereafter restricted to Thuringia and its dynastic unity swiftly crumbled, dividing into a number of smaller states, the Ernestine duchies. Nevertheless, with Ernst der Fromme, Duke of Saxe-Gotha (1601–1675), the house gave rise to an important early-modern ruler who was ahead of his time in supporting the education of his people and in improving administration. In the 18th century, Karl August, Duke of Saxe-Weimar-Eisenach, established what was to become known as Weimar Classicism at his court in Weimar, notably by bringing Johann Wolfgang von Goethe there.

It was only in the 19th century that one of the many Ernestine branches, the House of Saxe-Coburg and Gotha, regained importance through marriages as the "stud of Europe", by ascending the thrones of Belgium (in 1831), Portugal (1853–1910), Bulgaria (1908–1946) and the United Kingdom (1901–2022, though the relevant marriage had taken place in 1840) and also providing a consort to the future Habsburg Emperor of Mexico (1857).

==== Residences of Ernestine branches ====
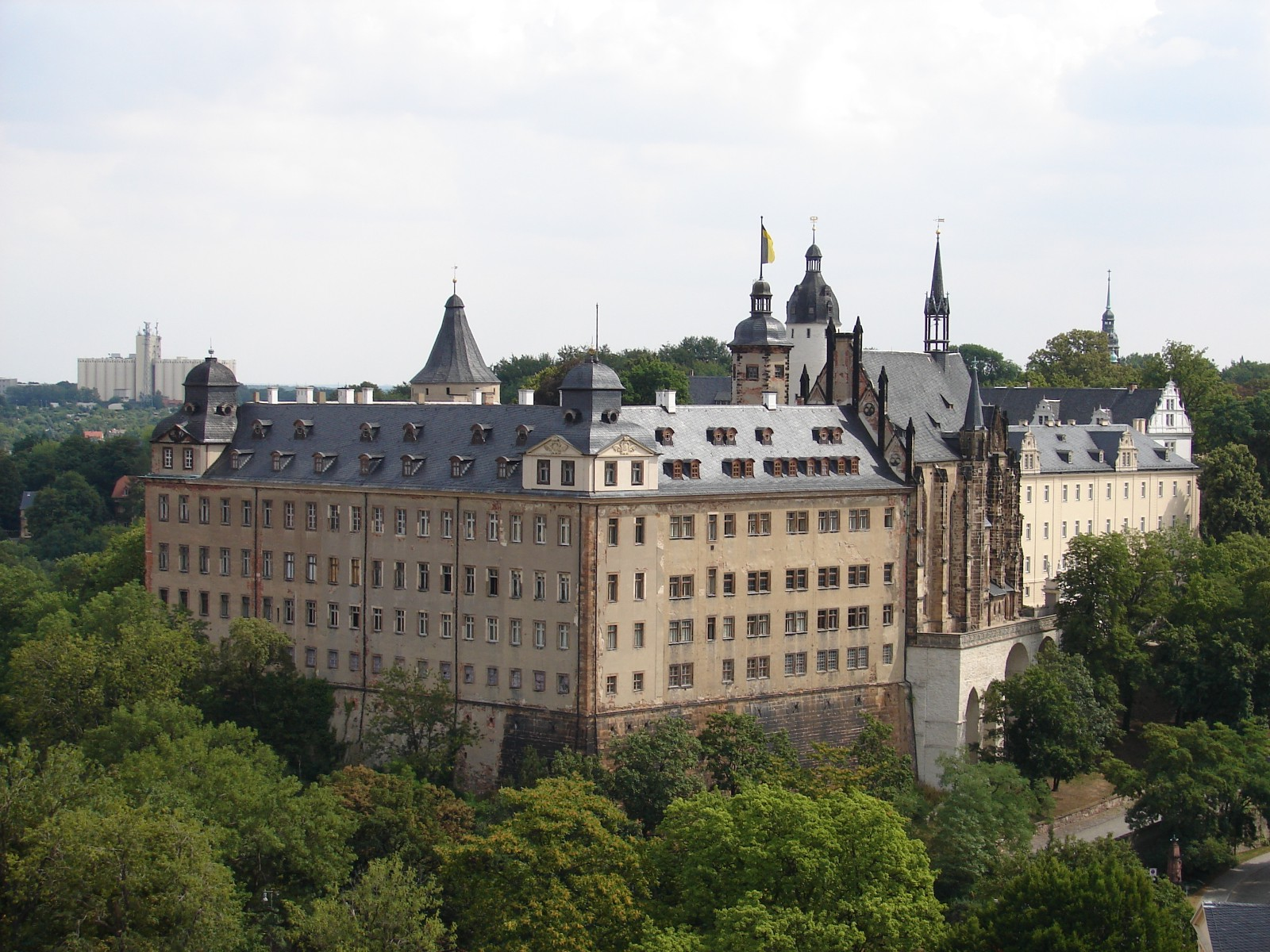
Altenburg Castle

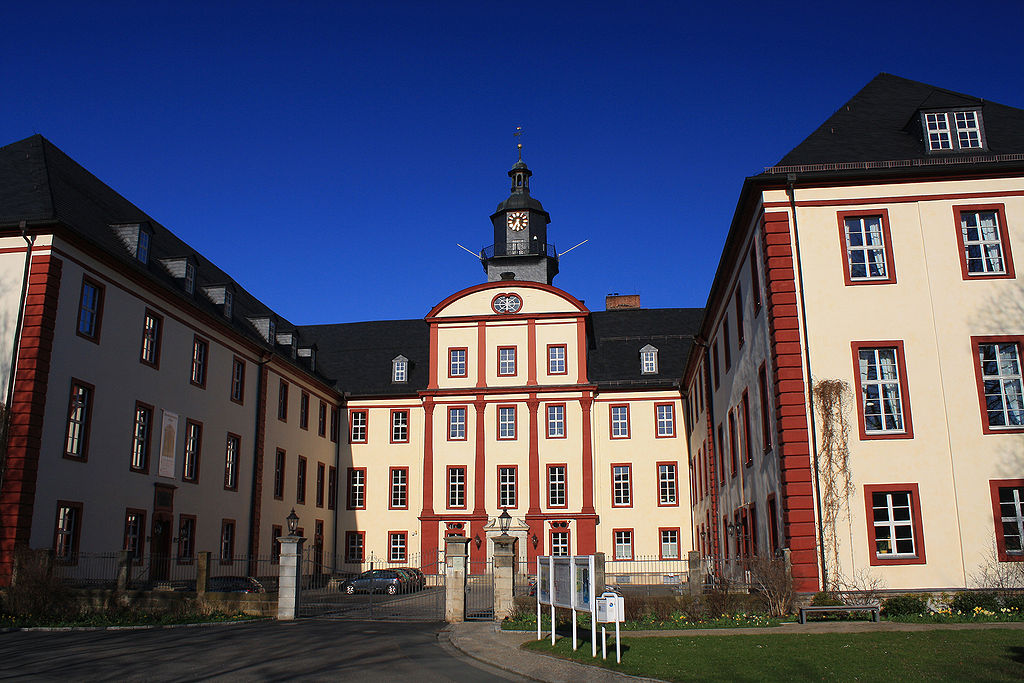
Saalfeld Castle

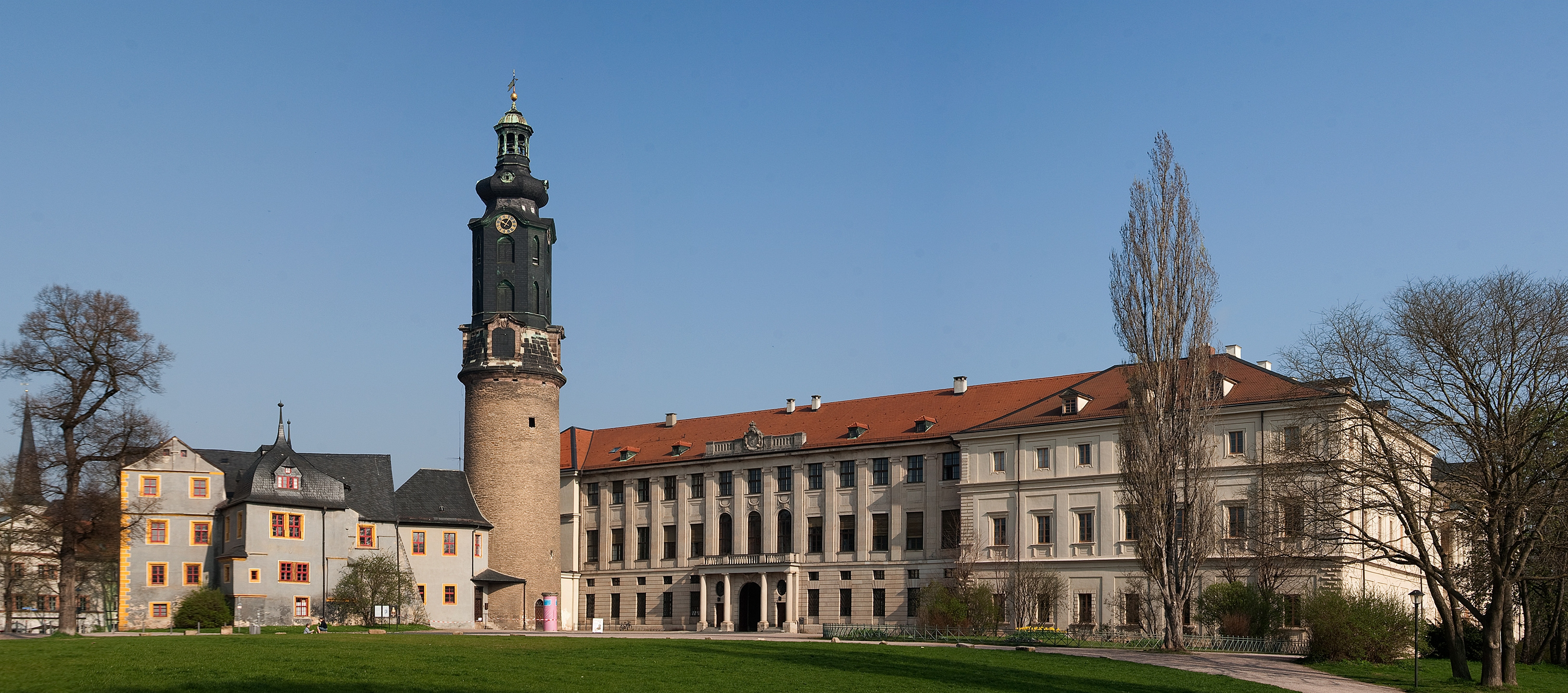
Schloss Weimar

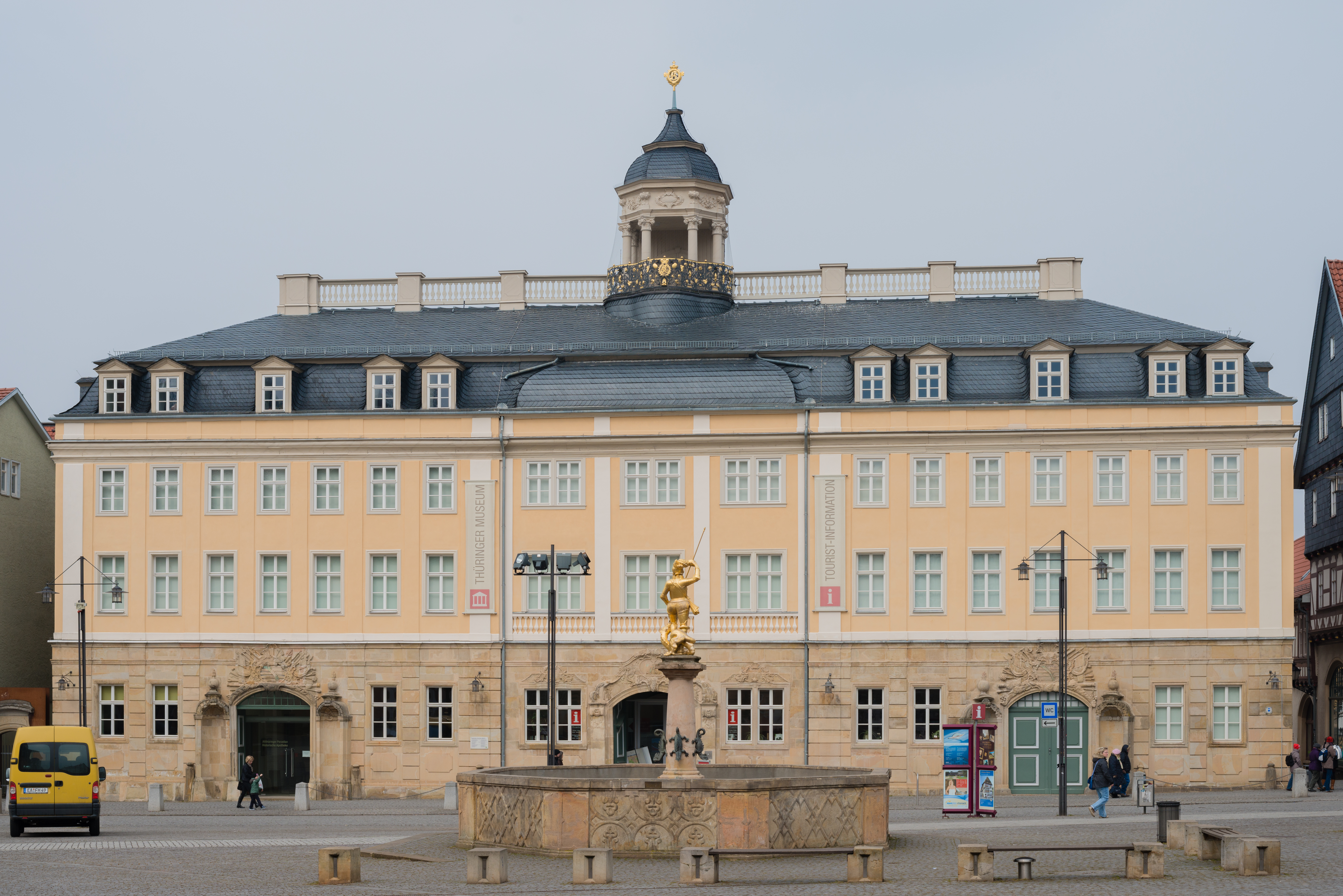
Eisenach Palace

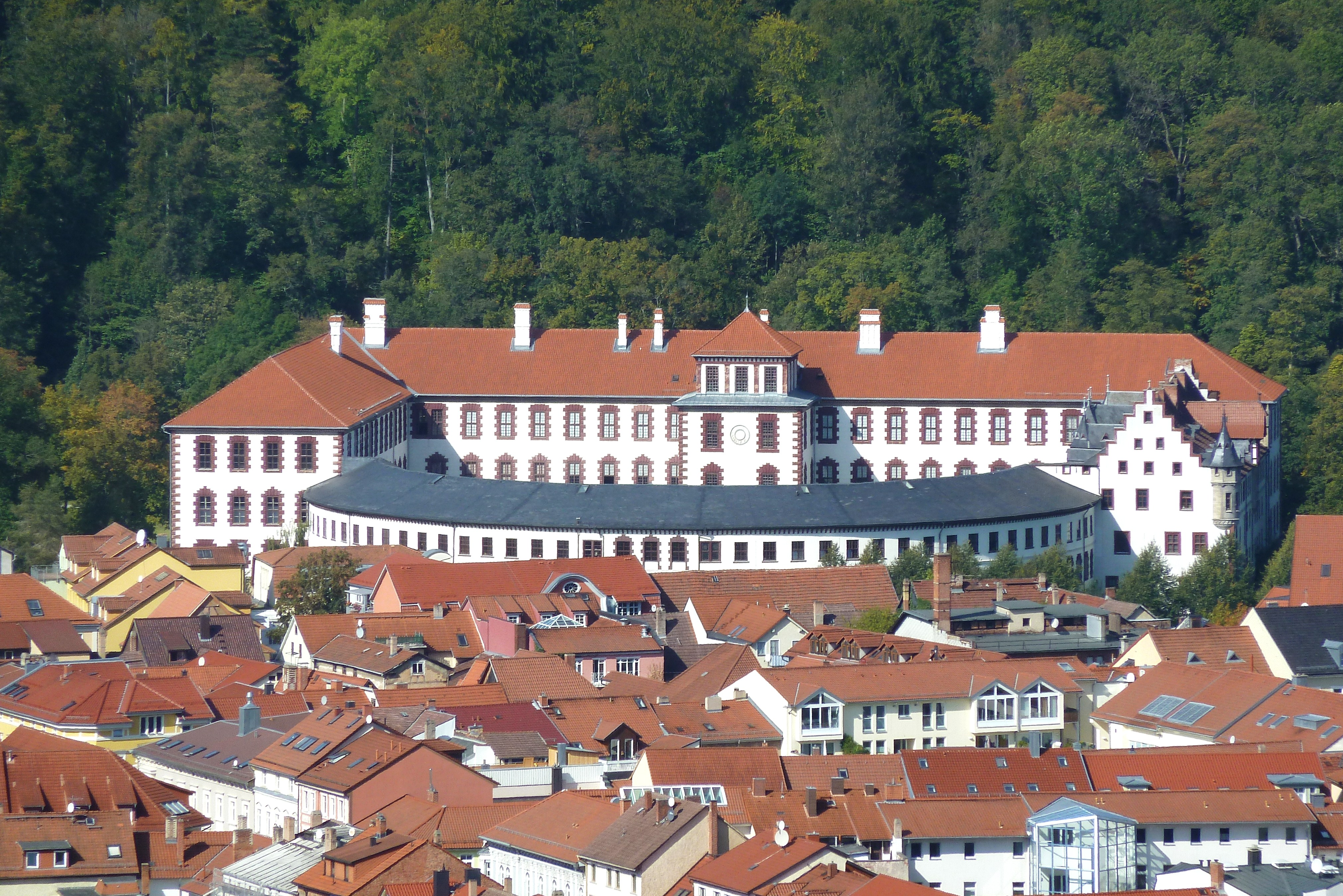
Elisabethenburg Palace in Meiningen

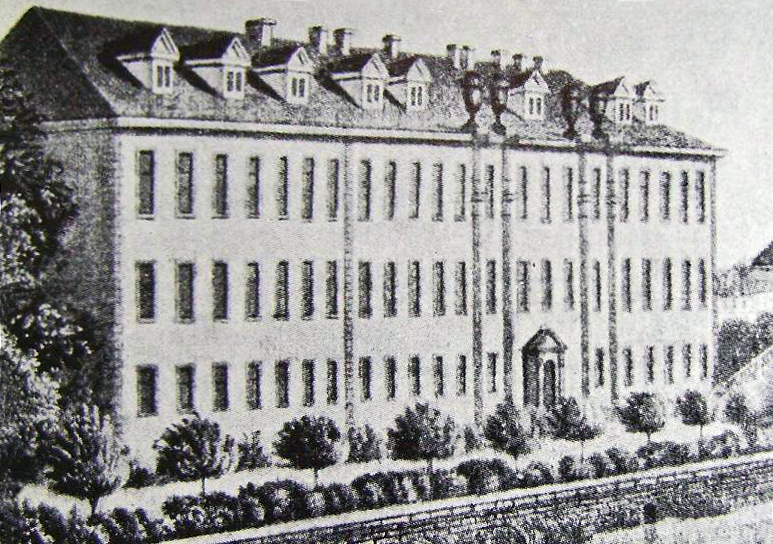
Hildburghausen Castle

=== Albertines ===
Albertine Wettins' royal coat of arms with the standard arms at the center (Kings of Saxony, 1806–1918)

The junior Albertine branch maintained most of the territorial integrity of Saxony, preserving it as a significant power in the region, and used small appanage fiefs for its cadet branches, few of which survived for significant lengths of time. The Ernestine Wettins, on the other hand, repeatedly subdivided their territory, creating an intricate patchwork of small duchies and counties in Thuringia.

The Albertine Wettins ruled as Electors (1547–1806) and Kings of Saxony (1806–1918), and also played a role in Polish history – two Wettins were Kings of Poland (between 1697 and 1763) and a third ruled the Duchy of Warsaw (1807–1814) as a satellite of Napoleon. After the Napoleonic Wars, the Albertine branch lost about 40% of its lands (the economically less-developed northern parts of the old Electorate of Saxony) to Prussia, restricting it to a territory coextensive with the modern Saxony (see Final Act of the Congress of Vienna Act IV: Treaty between Prussia and Saxony 18 May 1815). Frederick Augustus III lost his throne in the German Revolution of 1918.

The role of current head of the Albertine "House of Saxony" is claimed by his great-great-grandson Daniel von Sachsen (born 23 June 1975). However, the headship of Prince Daniel is contested by his second cousin once removed, Alexander (born 1954), son of Roberto Afif (later by change of name Mr Gessaphe) and Princess Maria Anna of Saxony, a sister of the childless former head of the Albertines, Maria Emanuel, Margrave of Meissen (died 2012), who had adopted his nephew and granted him the name Prince of Saxony, contrary to the rules of male descent under the Salic Law. However, neither are recognized by the Nobility Archive in Marburg, nor by the Conference of the Formerly Ruling Houses in Germany – Prince Daniel because his grandfather Timo was expelled from the House of Wettin, and Prince Alexander because he is not of agnatic noble descent (his father was Roberto Afif from Lebanon). Consequently, the Albertine branch of the House of Wettin is officially treated by the German nobility as extinct in its legal succession-line.

==== Residences of the Albertine branch (Electors, later Kings of Saxony) ====
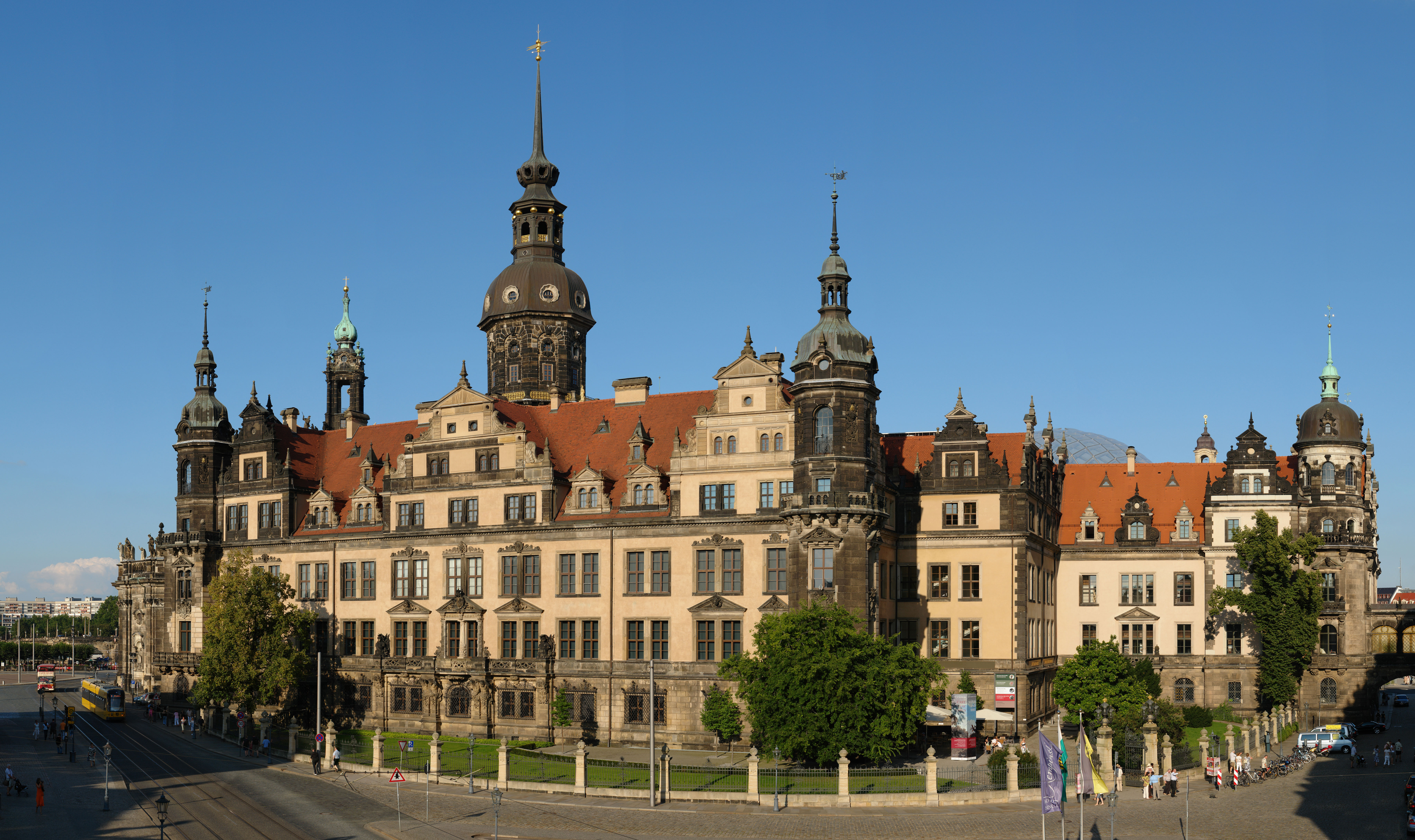
Dresden Royal Palace

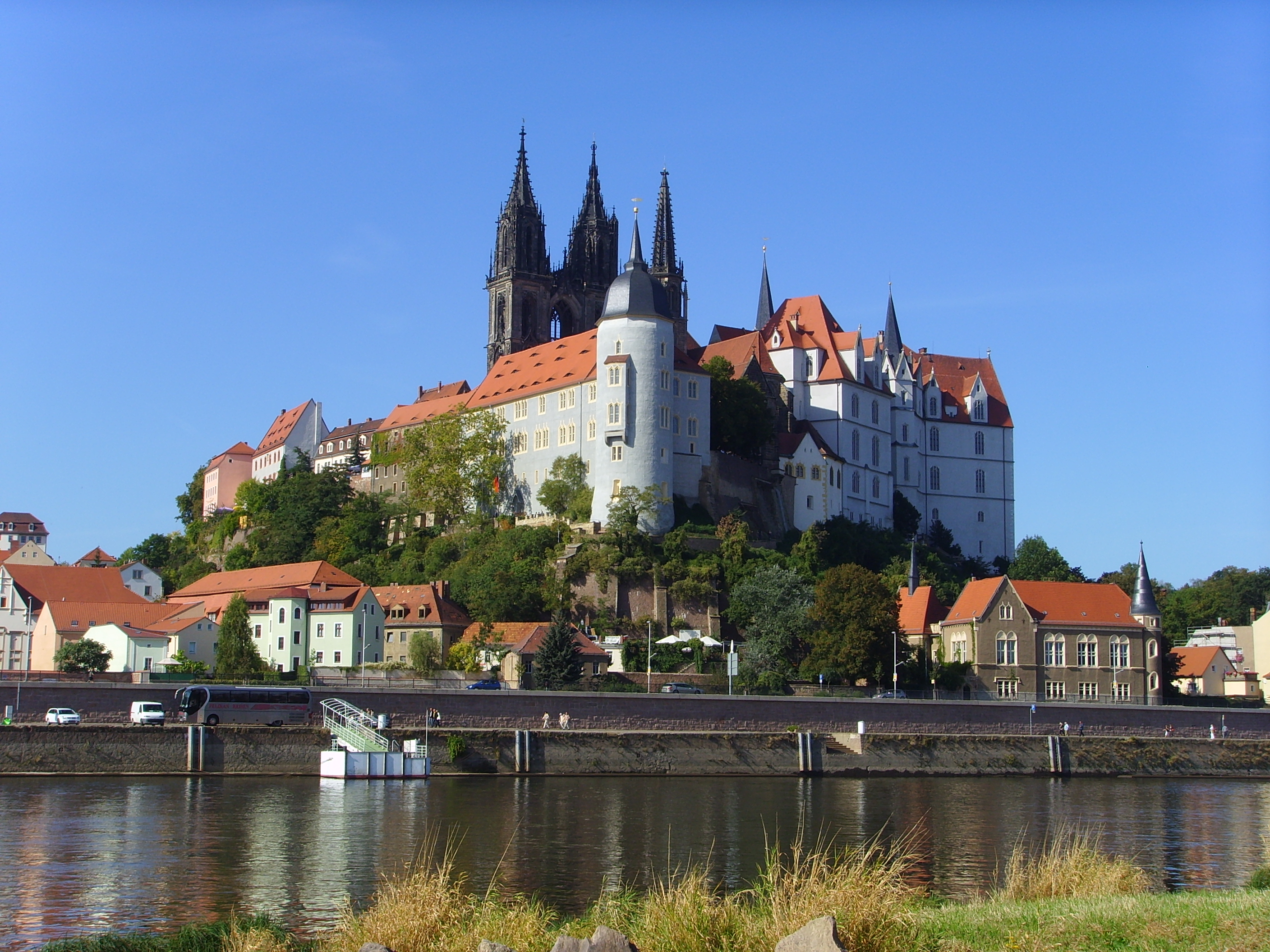
Meissen (near Dresden)

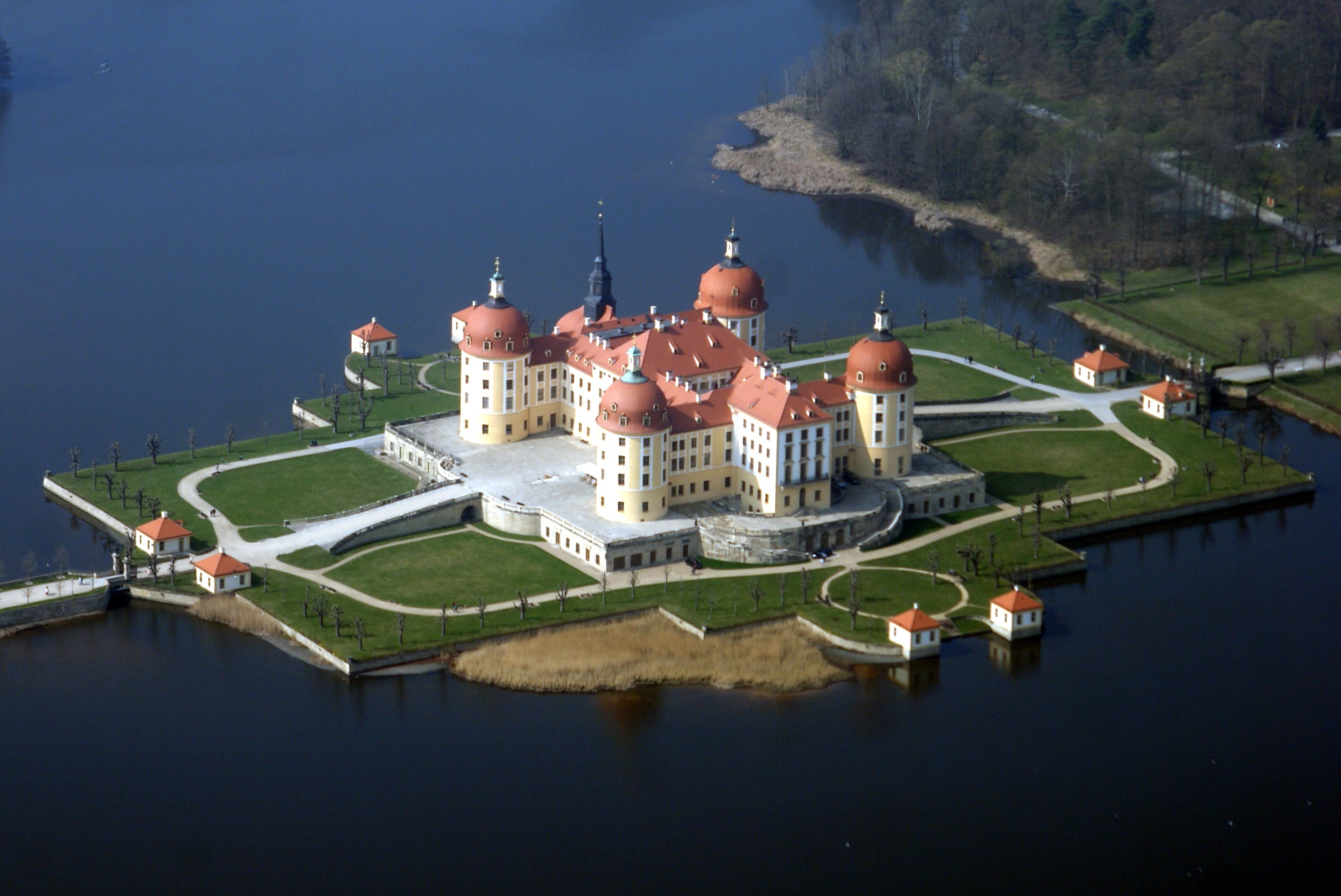
Hunting Palace of Moritzburg (near Dresden)

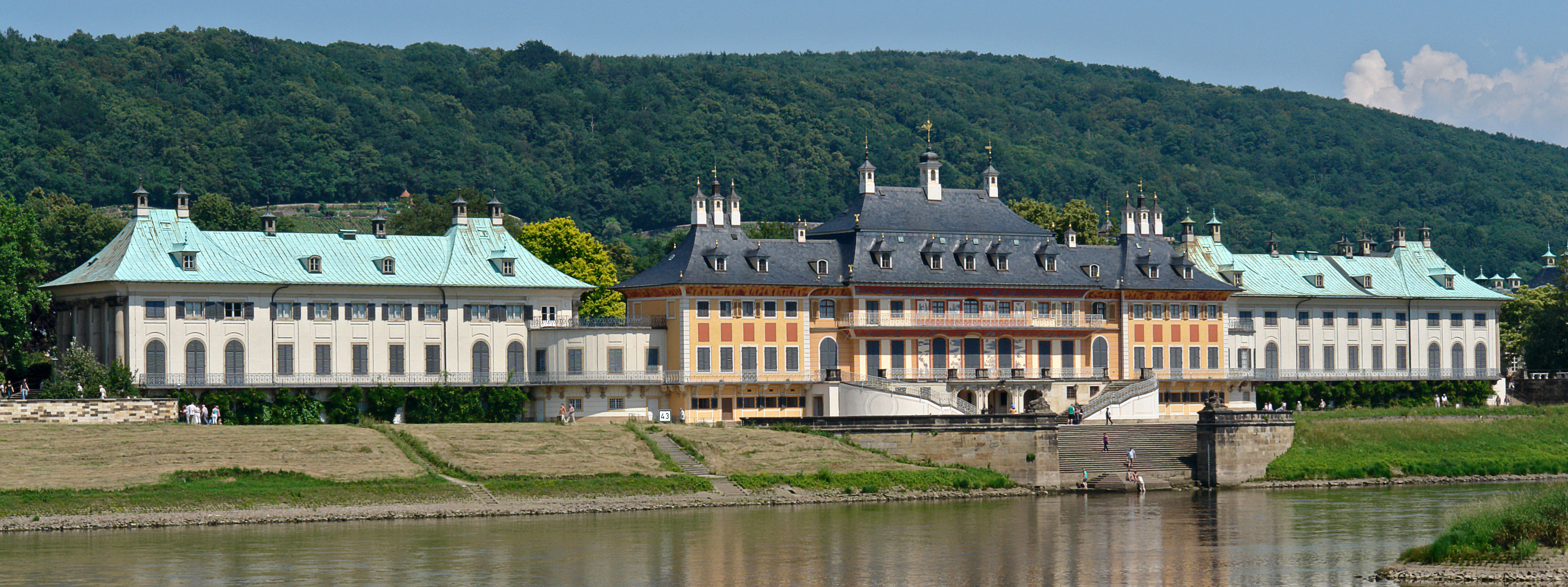
Pillnitz Palace (near Dresden)

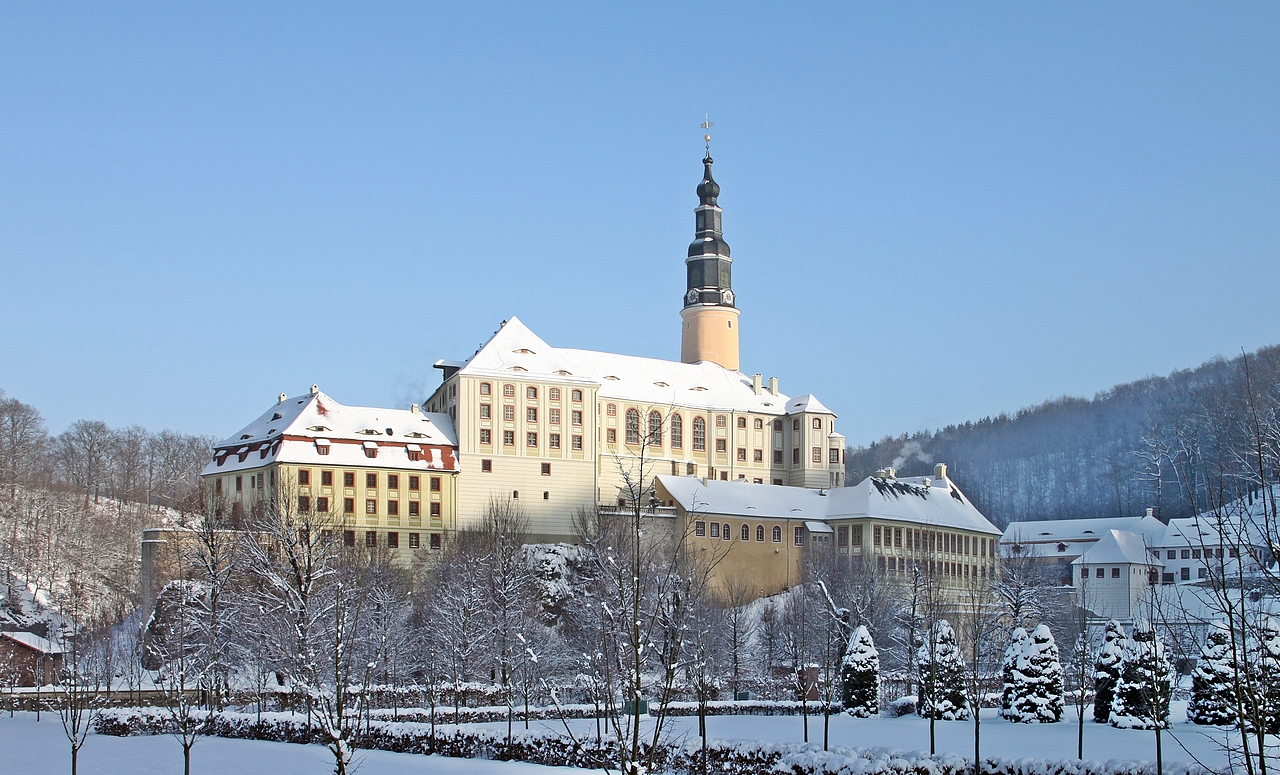
Weesenstein Castle (near Dresden)

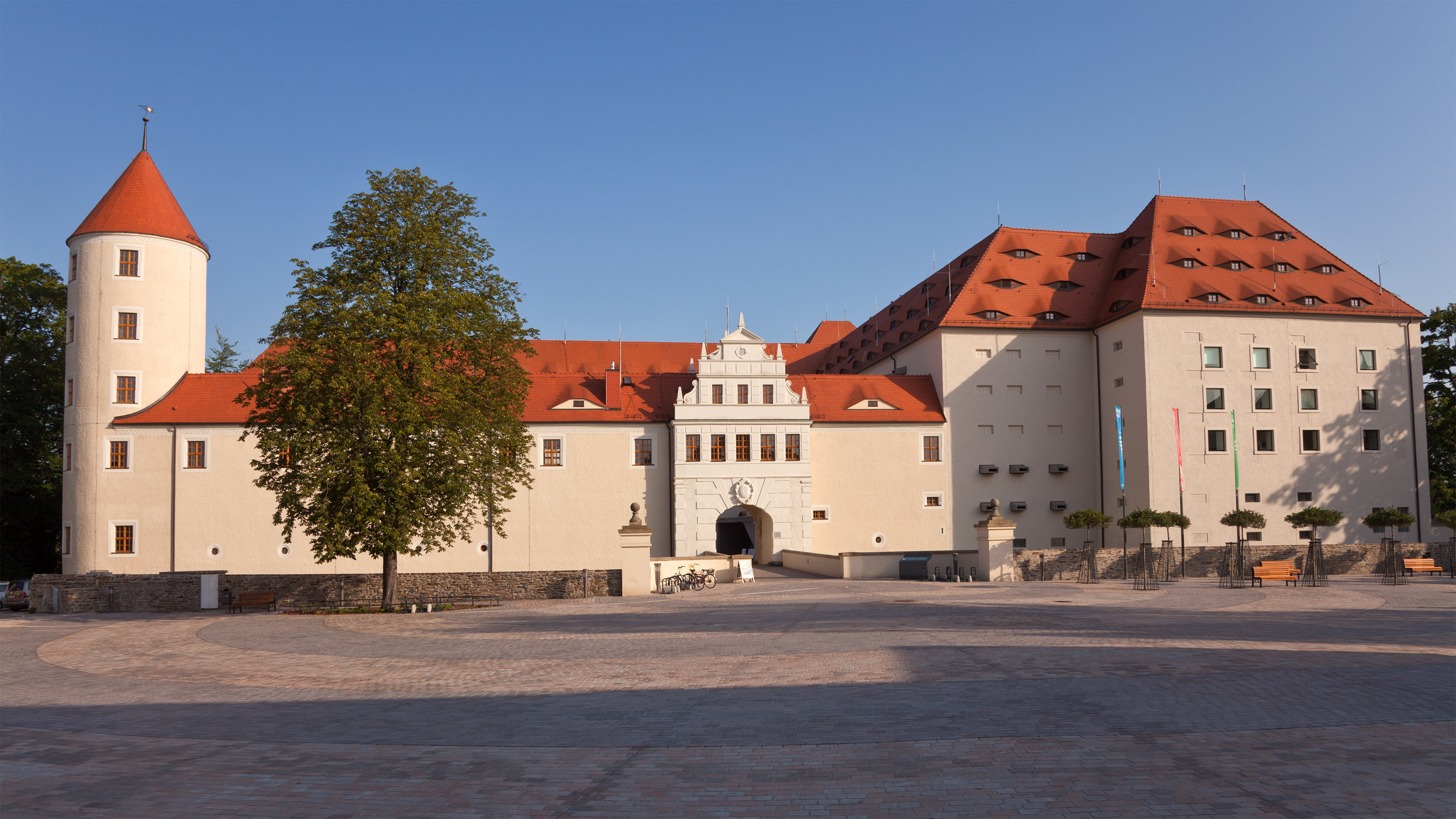
Freudenstein Castle at Freiberg

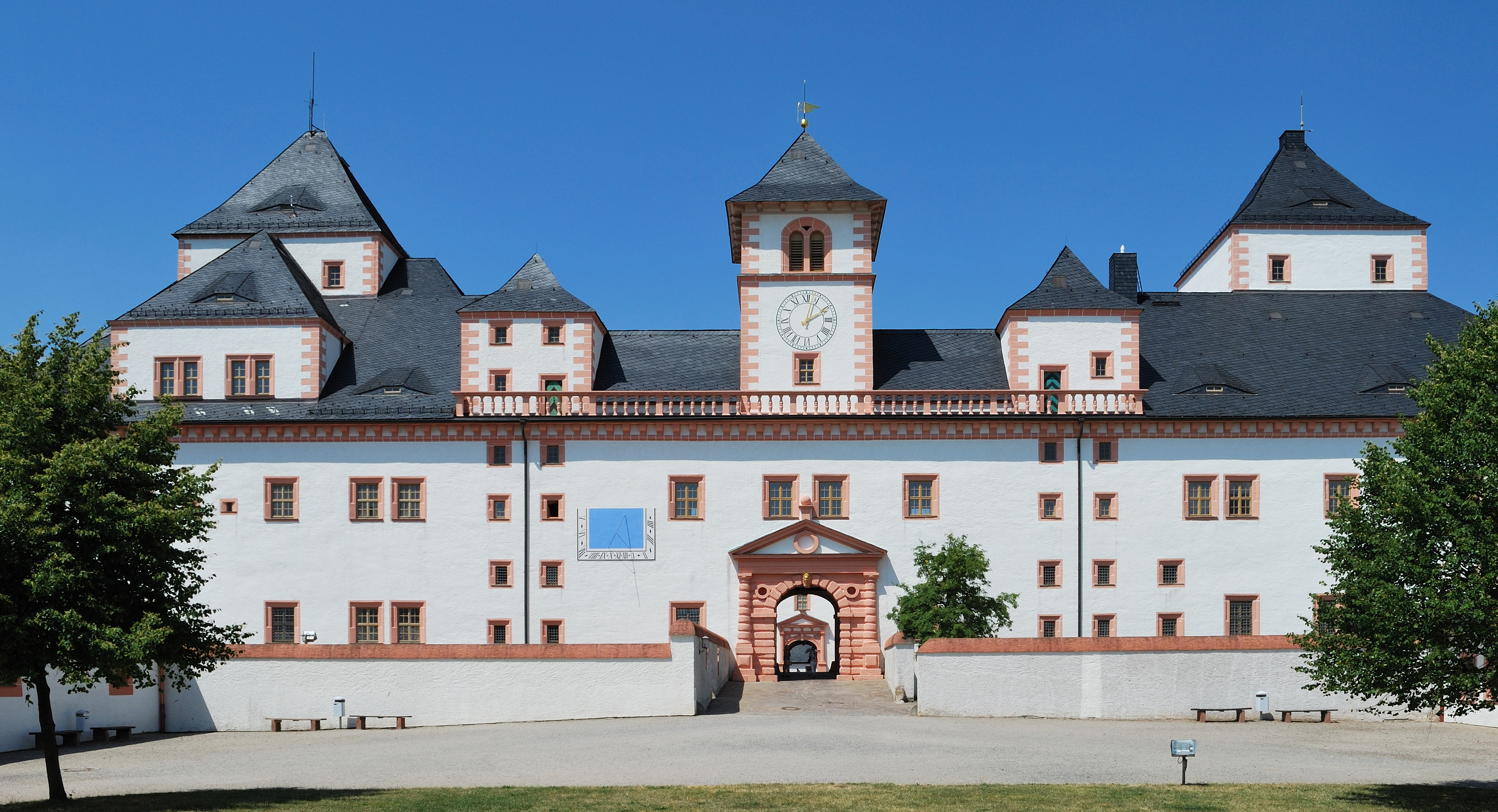
Augustusburg Hunting Lodge (near Chemnitz)

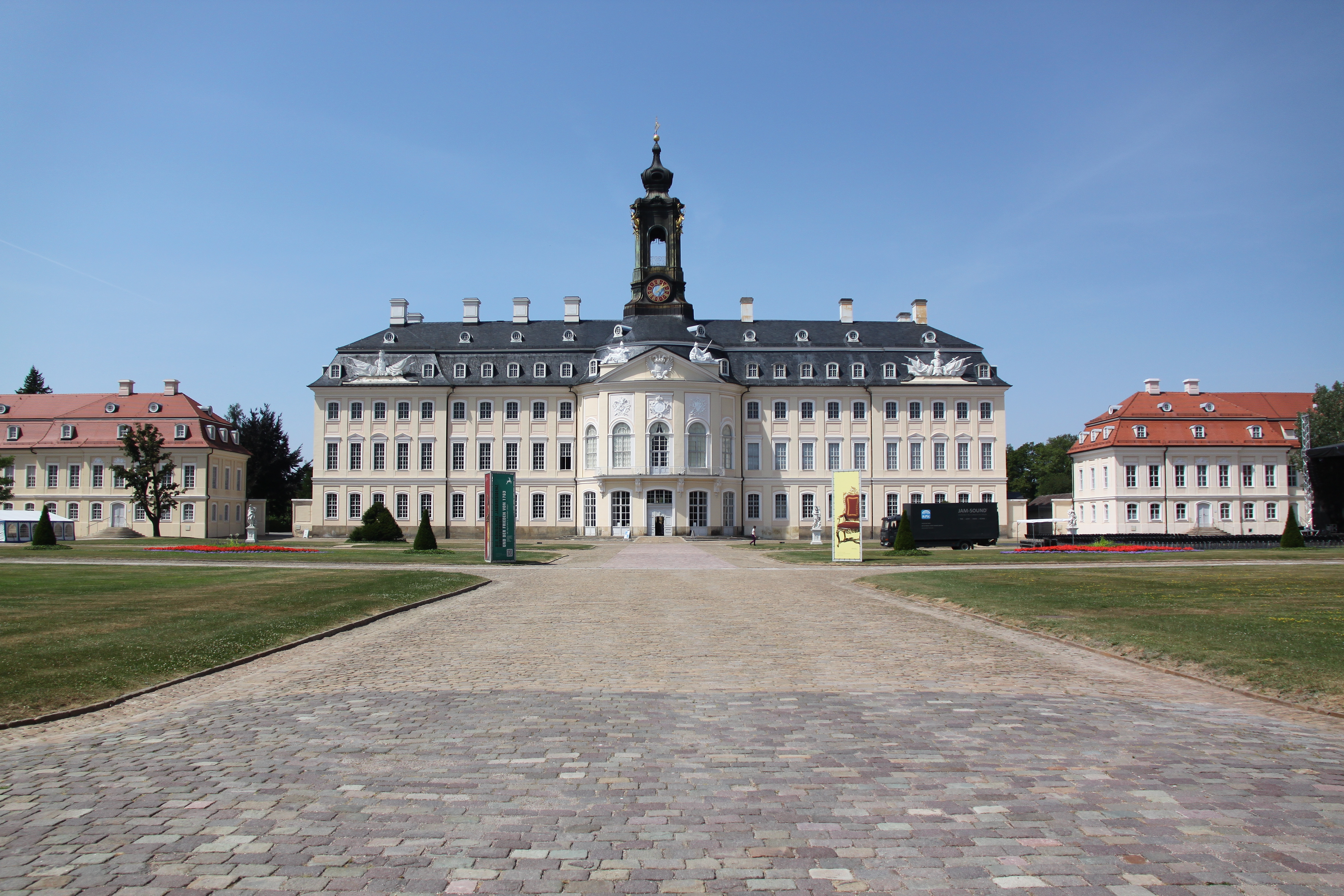
Hunting Palace of Hubertusburg (near Leipzig)

== The House of Saxe-Coburg and Gotha ==
House of Saxe-Coburg and Gotha

The senior (Ernestine) branch of the House of Wettin lost the electorship to the Albertine line in 1547, but retained its holdings in Thuringia, dividing the area into a number of smaller states. One of the resulting Ernestine houses, known as Saxe-Coburg-Saalfeld until 1826 and as Saxe-Coburg and Gotha after that, went on to contribute kings of Belgium (from 1831) and Bulgaria (1908–1946), as well as furnishing consorts to queens regnant of Portugal (Prince Ferdinand) and the United Kingdom (Prince Albert), and the Emperor of Mexico (Carlota of Mexico). Thus, the British and Portuguese thrones became possessions of persons who belonged to the House of Wettin for a time.

From King George I to Queen Victoria, the British Royal family was called the House of Hanover, being a junior branch of the House of Brunswick-Lüneburg and thus part of the dynasty of the Guelphs. In the late 19th century, Queen Victoria charged the College of Arms in England to determine the correct personal surname of her late husband, Prince Albert of Saxe-Coburg and Gotha — and, thus, the proper surname of the royal family upon the accession of her son. After extensive research, they concluded that it was Wettin, but this name was never used, either by the Queen or by her son (King Edward VII) or by her grandson (King George V); they were simply Kings of the House of "Saxe-Coburg-Gotha".

Severe anti-German sentiment during World War I (1914–1918) led some influential members of the British public (especially radical Republicans such as H. G. Wells) to question the loyalty of the royal family. Advisors to King George V searched for an acceptable surname for the British royal family, but Wettin was rejected as "unsuitably comic". An Order in Council legally changed the name of the British royal family to "Windsor" (originally suggested by Lord Stamfordham) in 1917.

=== Residences of the Dukes of Coburg and Gotha ===
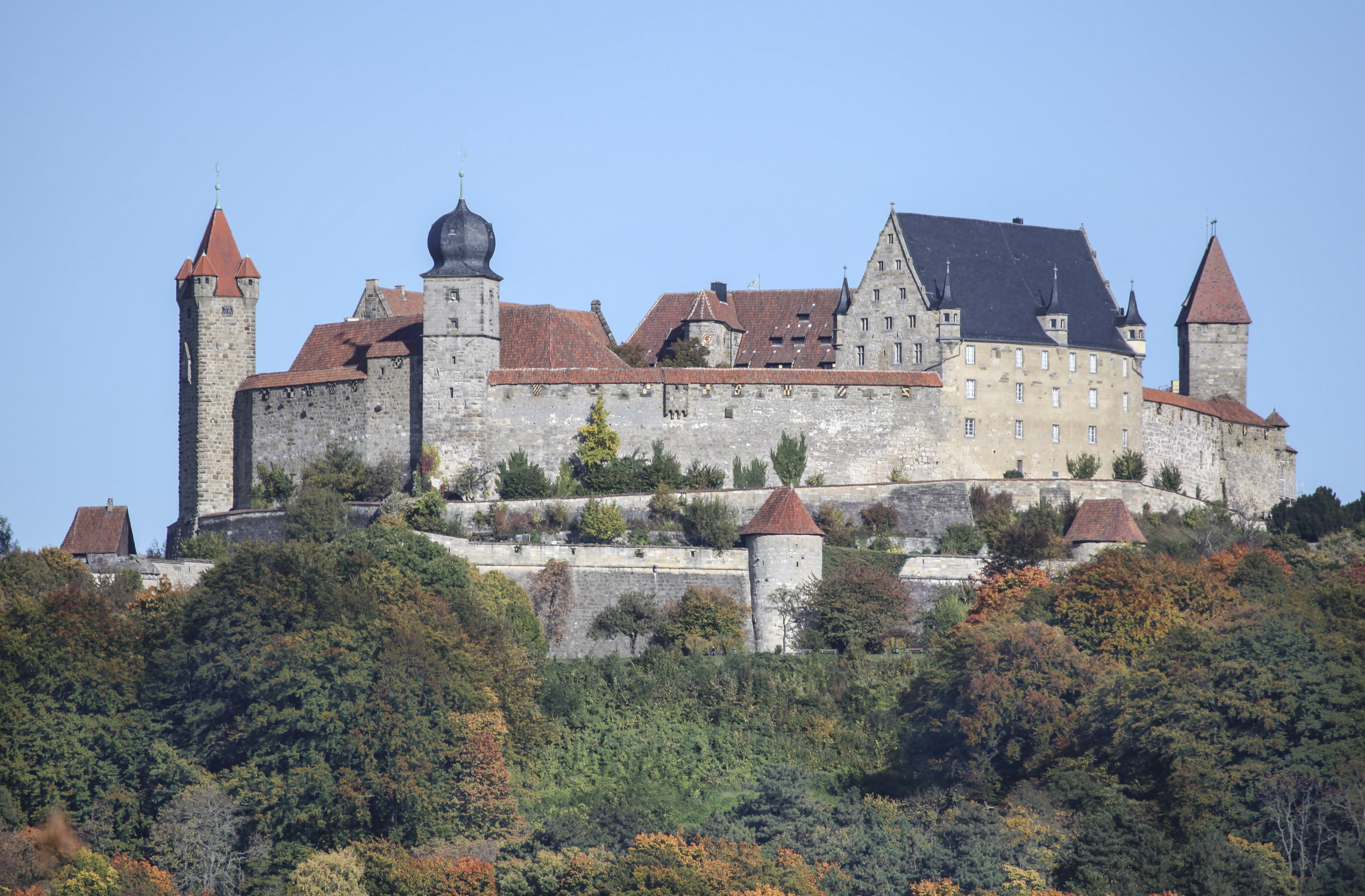
Veste Coburg, ancestral seat of the House of Saxe-Coburg

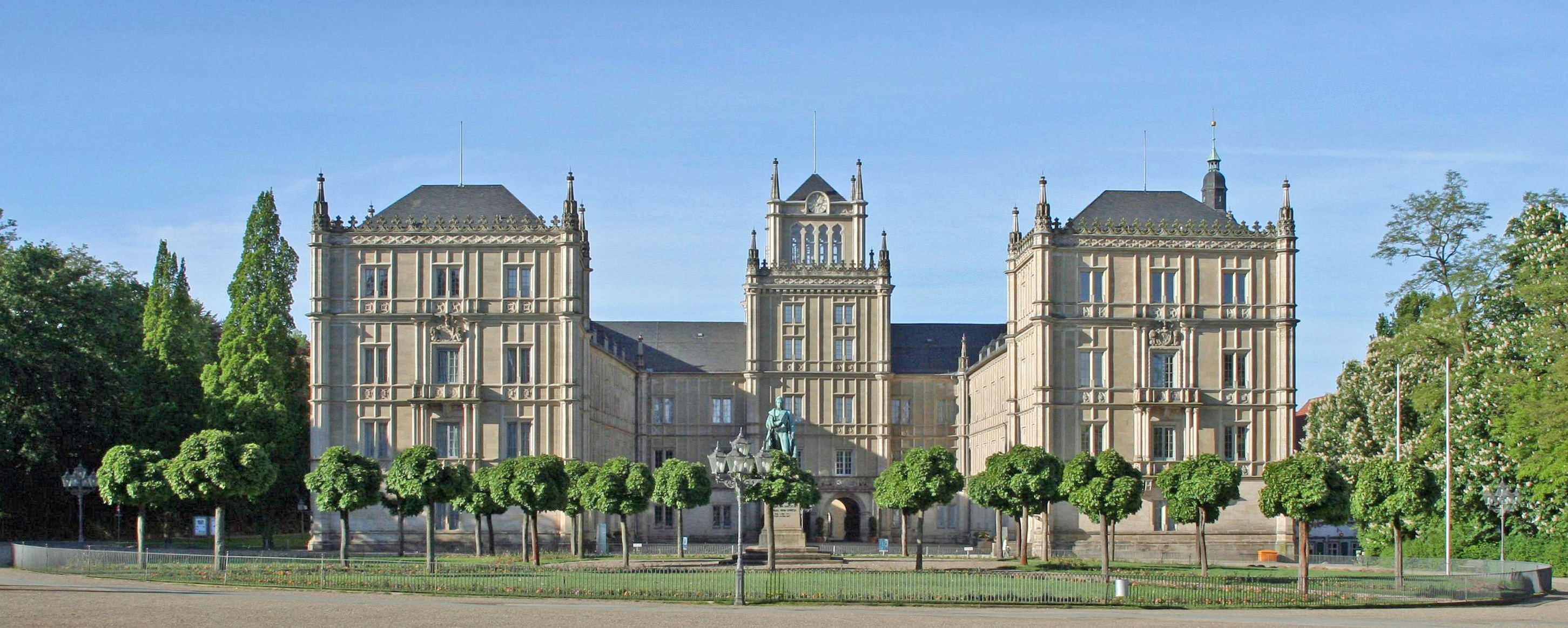
Ehrenburg Palace, Coburg (summer residence)

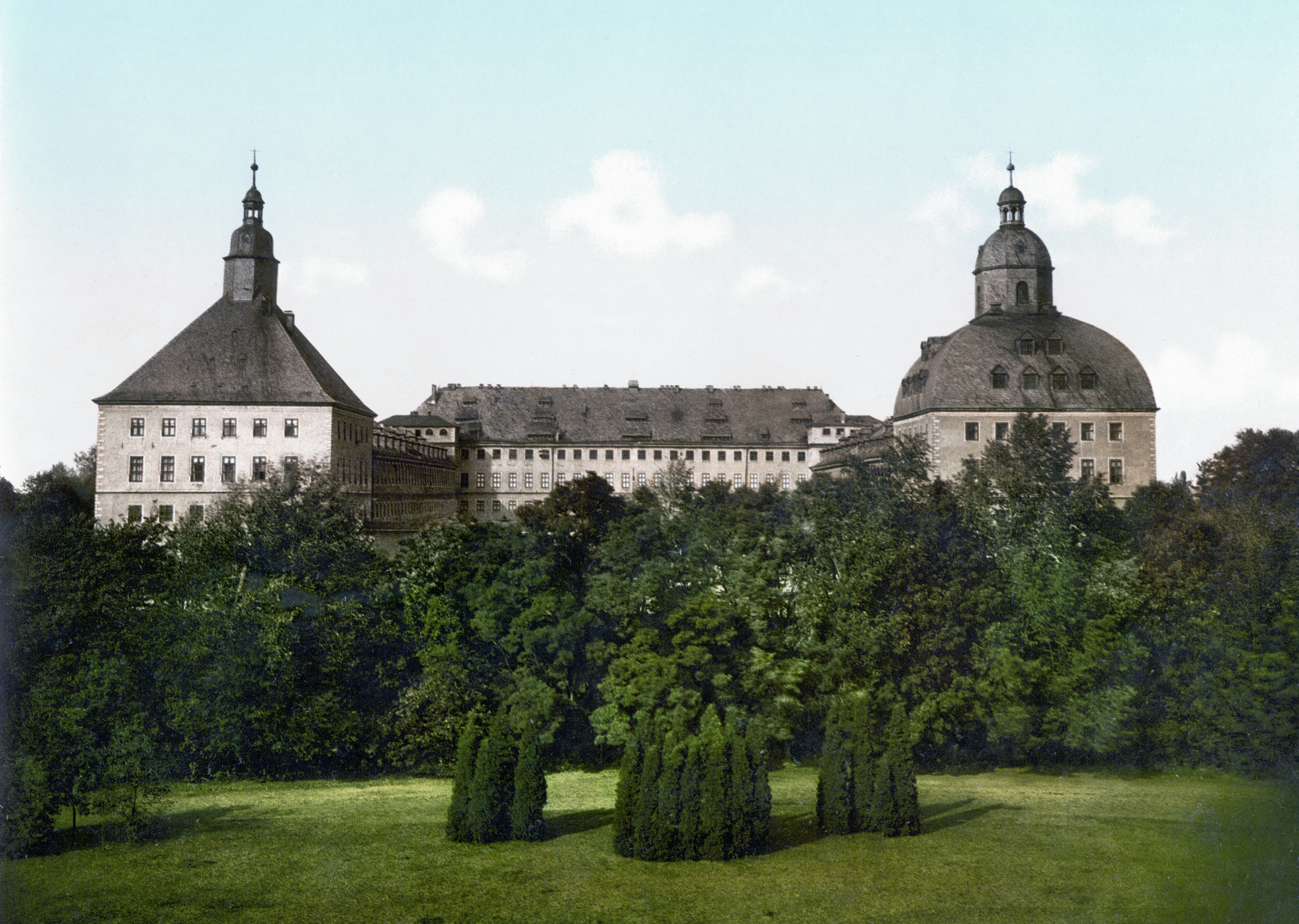
Friedenstein Castle, Gotha (winter residence)

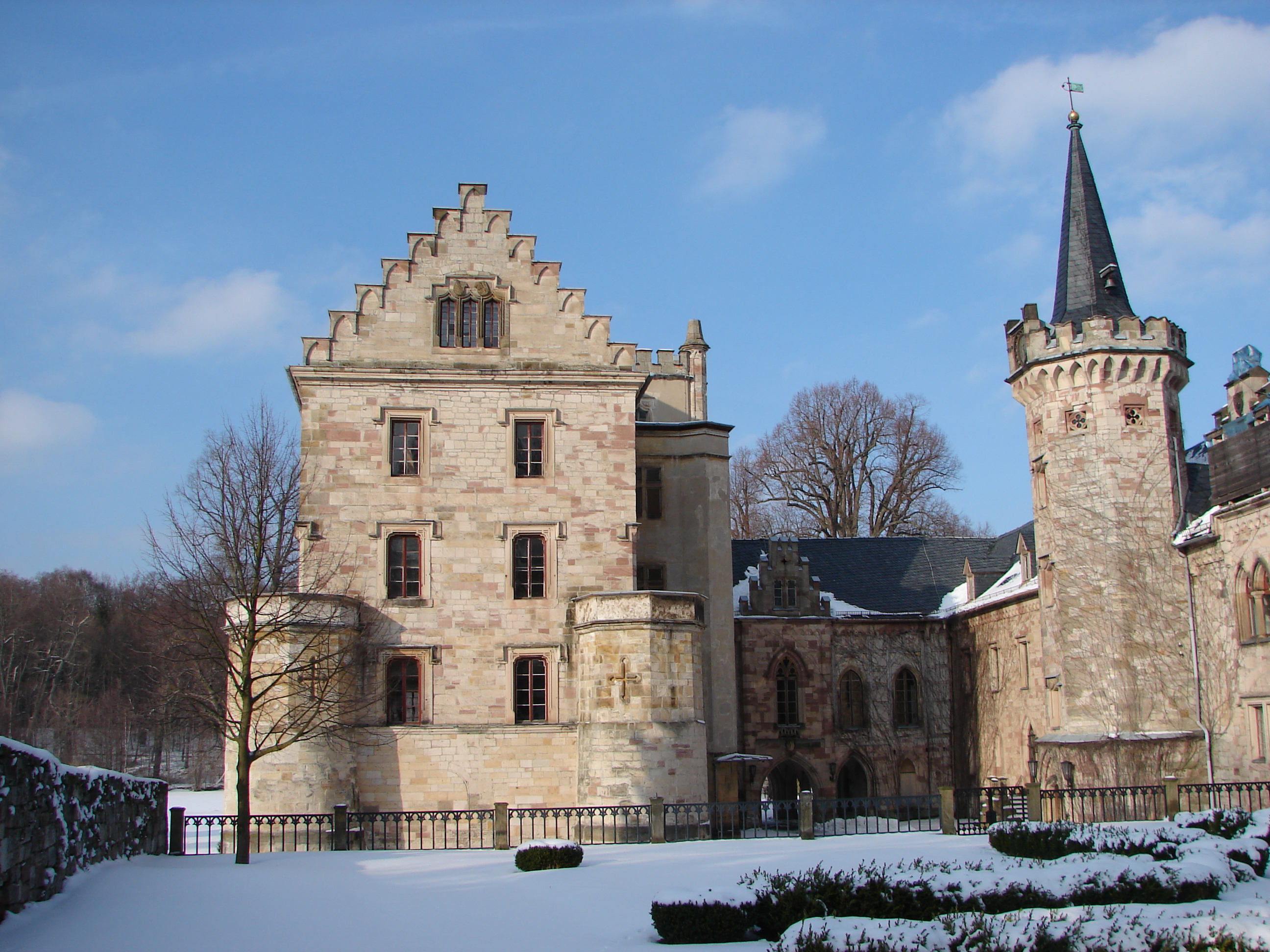
Reinhardsbrunn Castle, Gotha

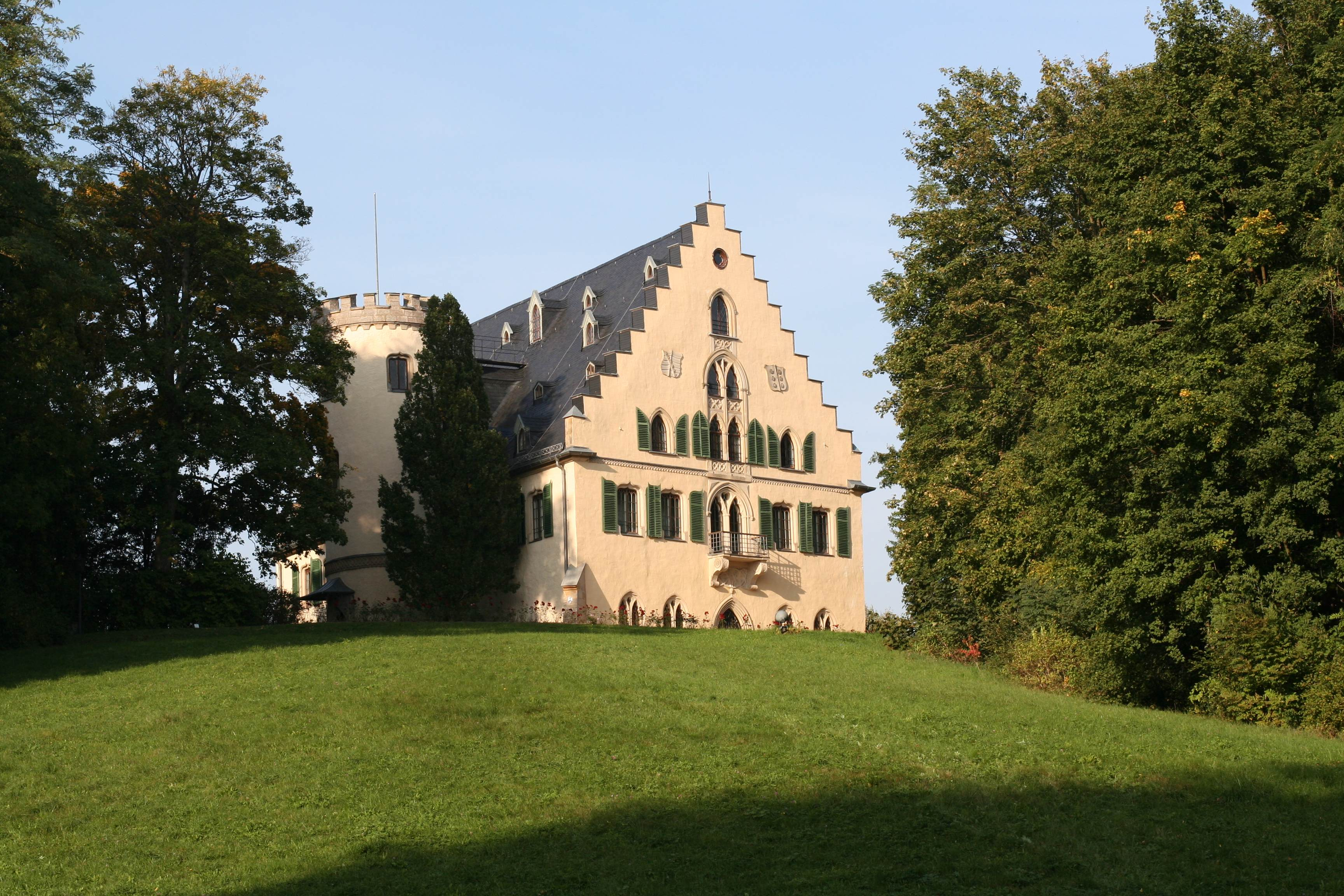
Rosenau Castle, Coburg

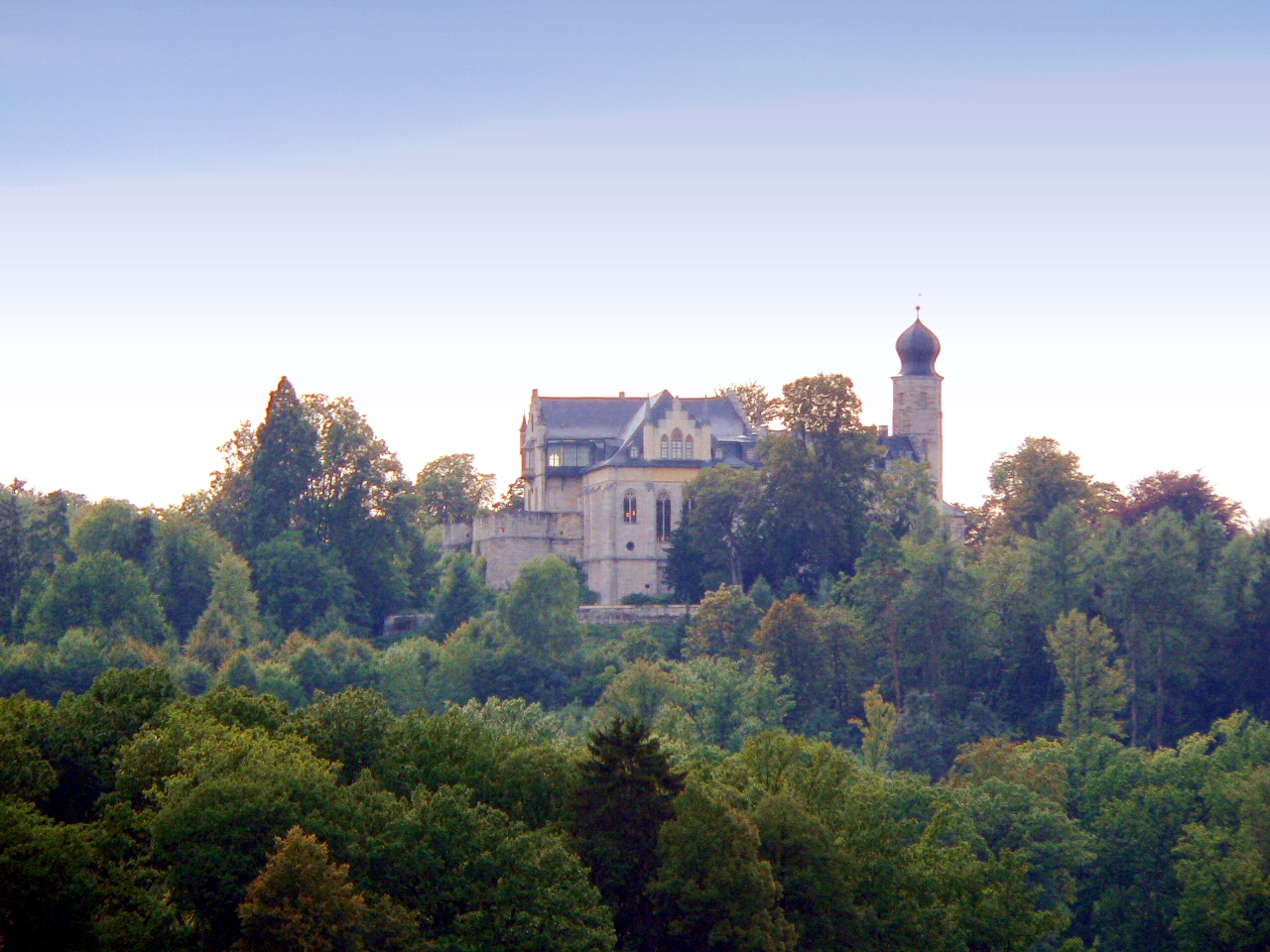
Callenberg Castle, Coburg

== Branches and titles of the House of Wettin and its agnatic descent ==
=== Early Wettins ===
- Counts of Wettin
- Margraves of Landsberg
- Margraves of Meissen
- Margraves of Lusatia
- Dukes of Saxony, Landgraves of Thuringia
- Electors of Saxony and Arch-Marshals of the Holy Roman Empire
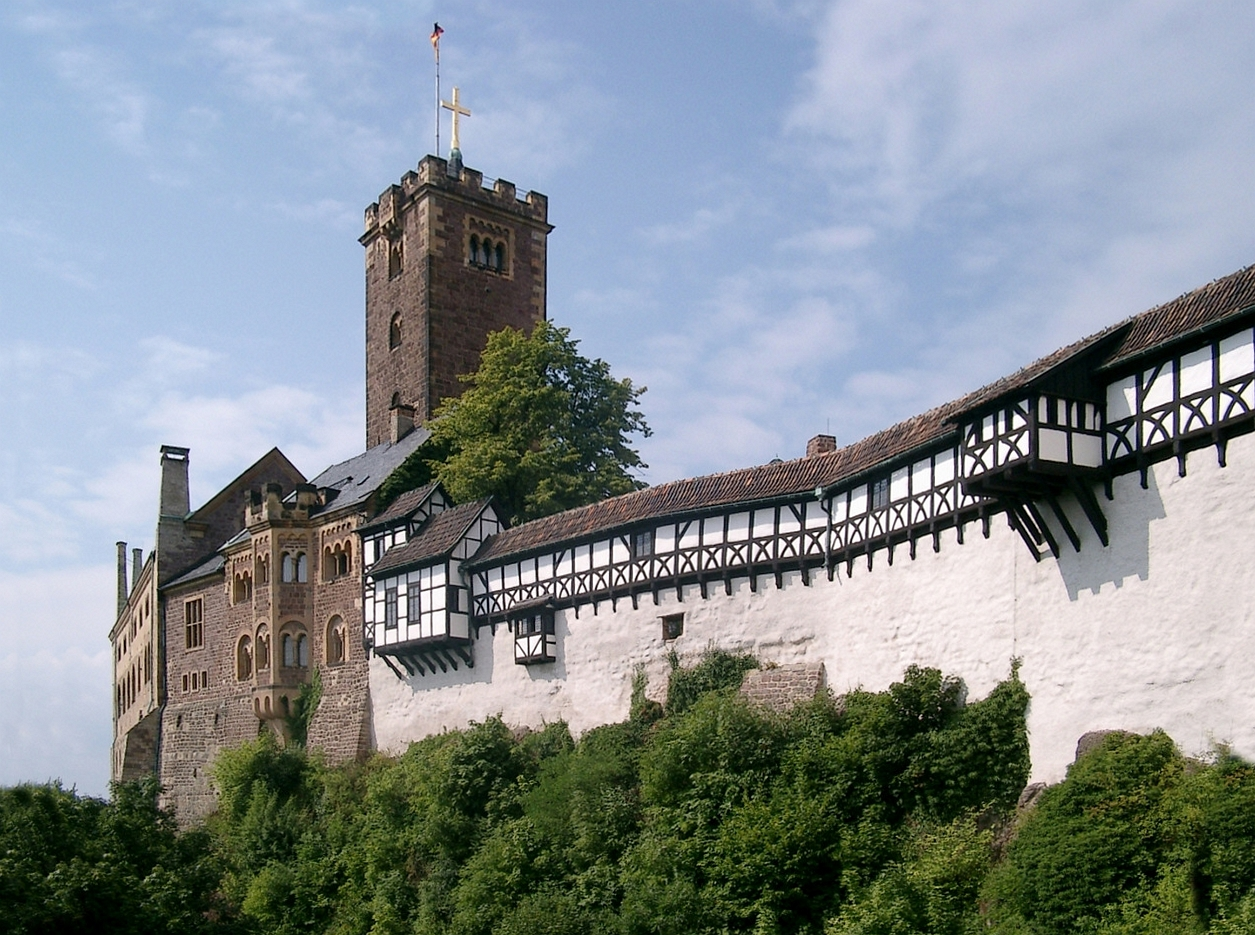
Wartburg near Eisenach (1250–1406: residence of the Wettins)

=== Ernestines ===
- Electors of Saxony and Arch-Marshals of the Holy Roman Empire (1464–1547)
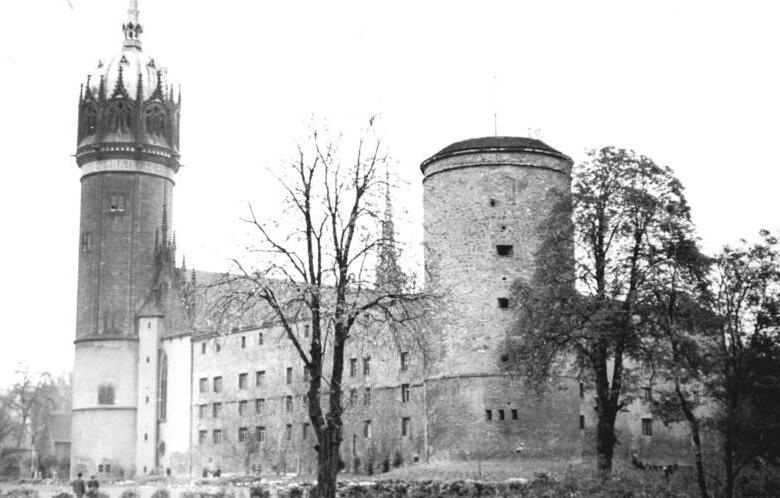
Wittenberg Castle, residence of Frederick III, "the Wise", built 1490–96

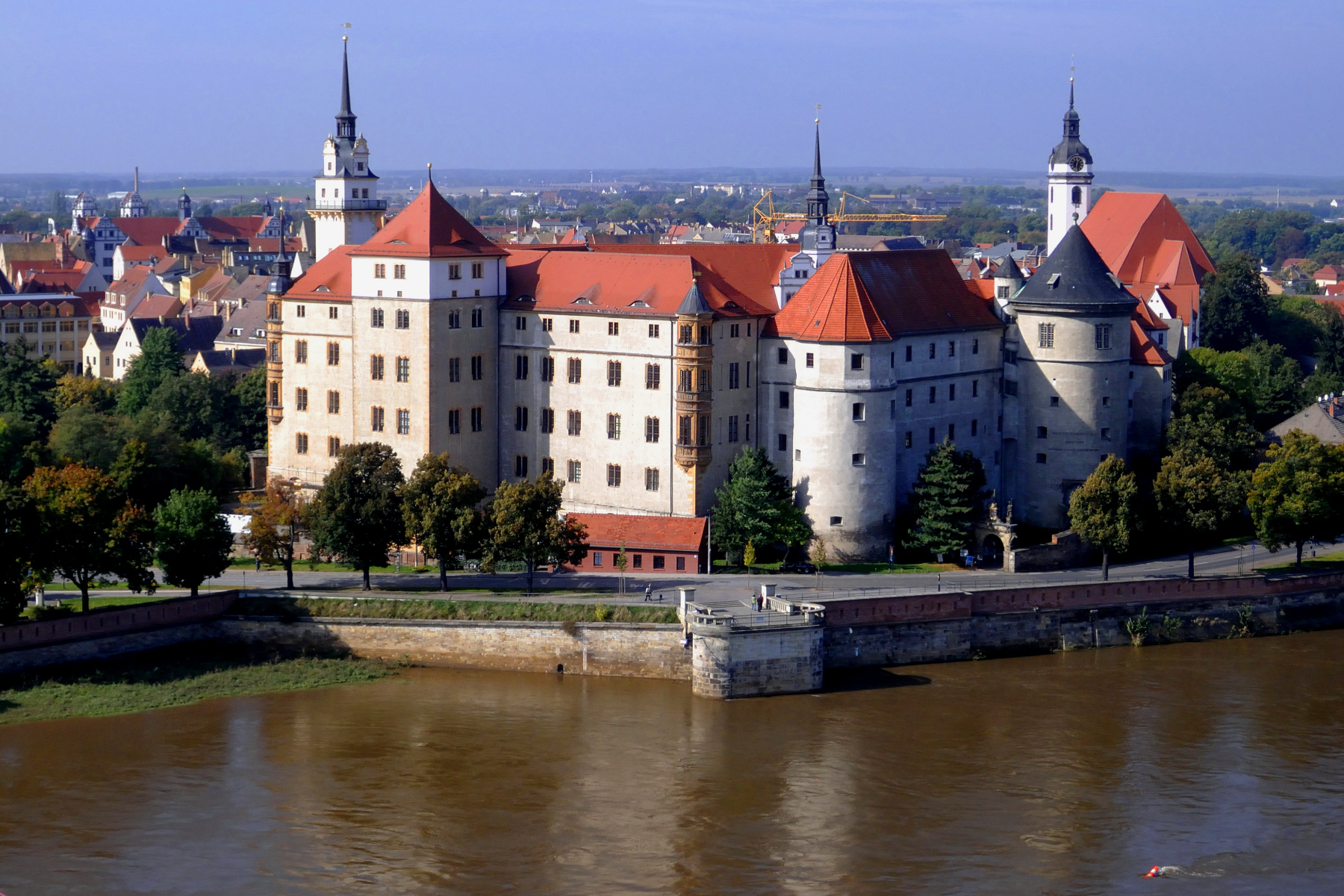
Hartenfels Castle in Torgau, main residence of the Ernestine Electors since Frederick III, "the Wise", built 1533–40

==== Existing Ernestine branches ====
Branch of Saxe-Weimar-Eisenach

- Saxe-Weimar-Eisenach, extant lines all shared last common ancestor in the person of William Ernest, Grand Duke of Saxe-Weimar-Eisenach. However, there are only two members of this line left, Michael, Prince of Saxe-Weimar-Eisenach and Prince Wilhelm Ernst of Saxe-Weimar-Eisenach. Both were born in 1946. Since Prince Michael has no sons, and Prince Wilhelm Ernst; whose only son Prince Georg-Constantin (13 April 1977 – 9 June 2018), a banker who was married but without issue, was killed in a horse riding accident on 9 June 2018 while riding with Jean Christophe Iseux von Pfetten. Therefore, the Grand Ducal House of Saxe-Weimar-Eisenach will most likely become extinct in the male line. These two represent the last non-morganatic descendants of William, Duke of Saxe-Weimar
  - Illegitimate line of Barons of Heygendorff, four males left
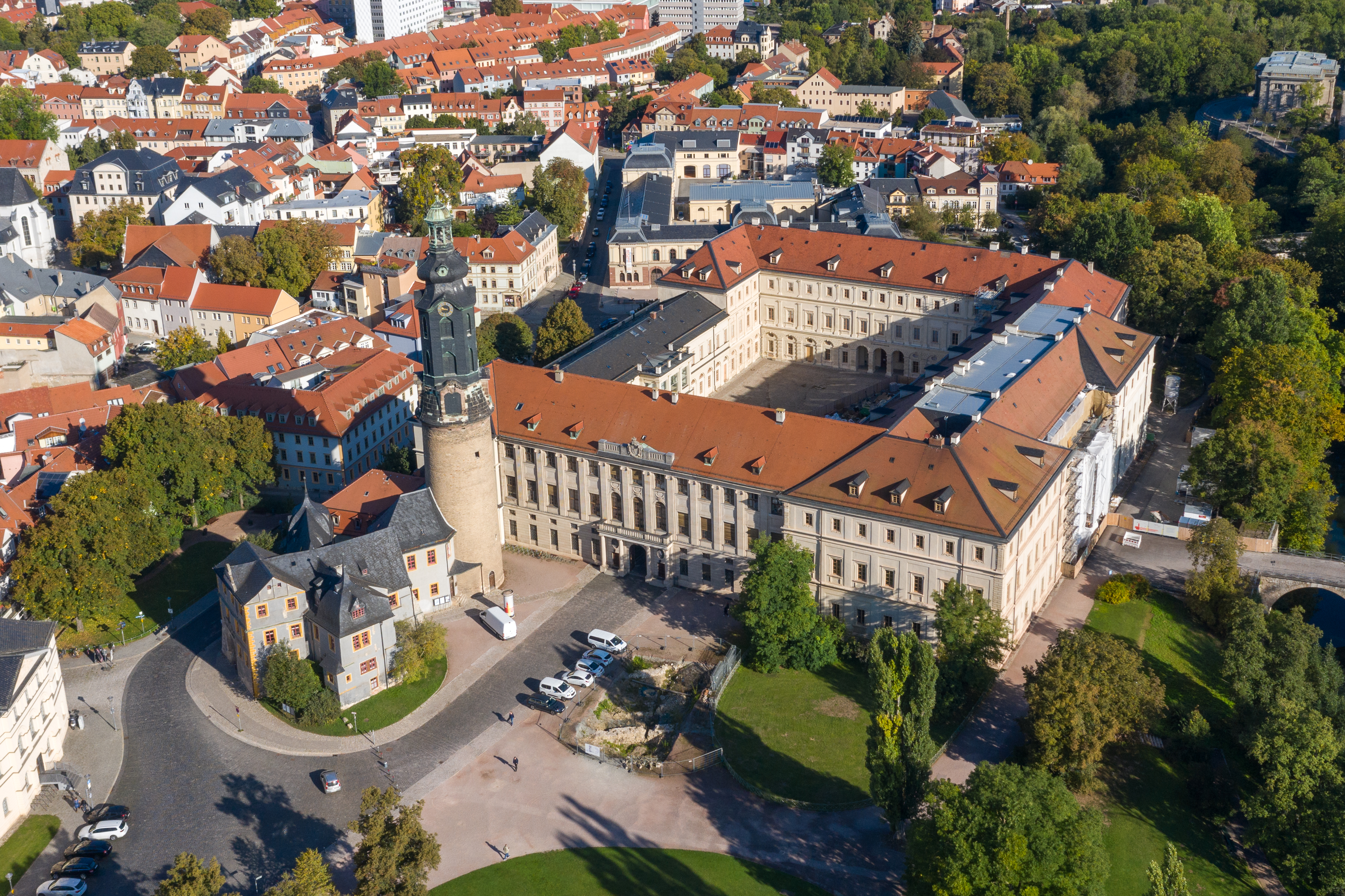
Schloss Weimar

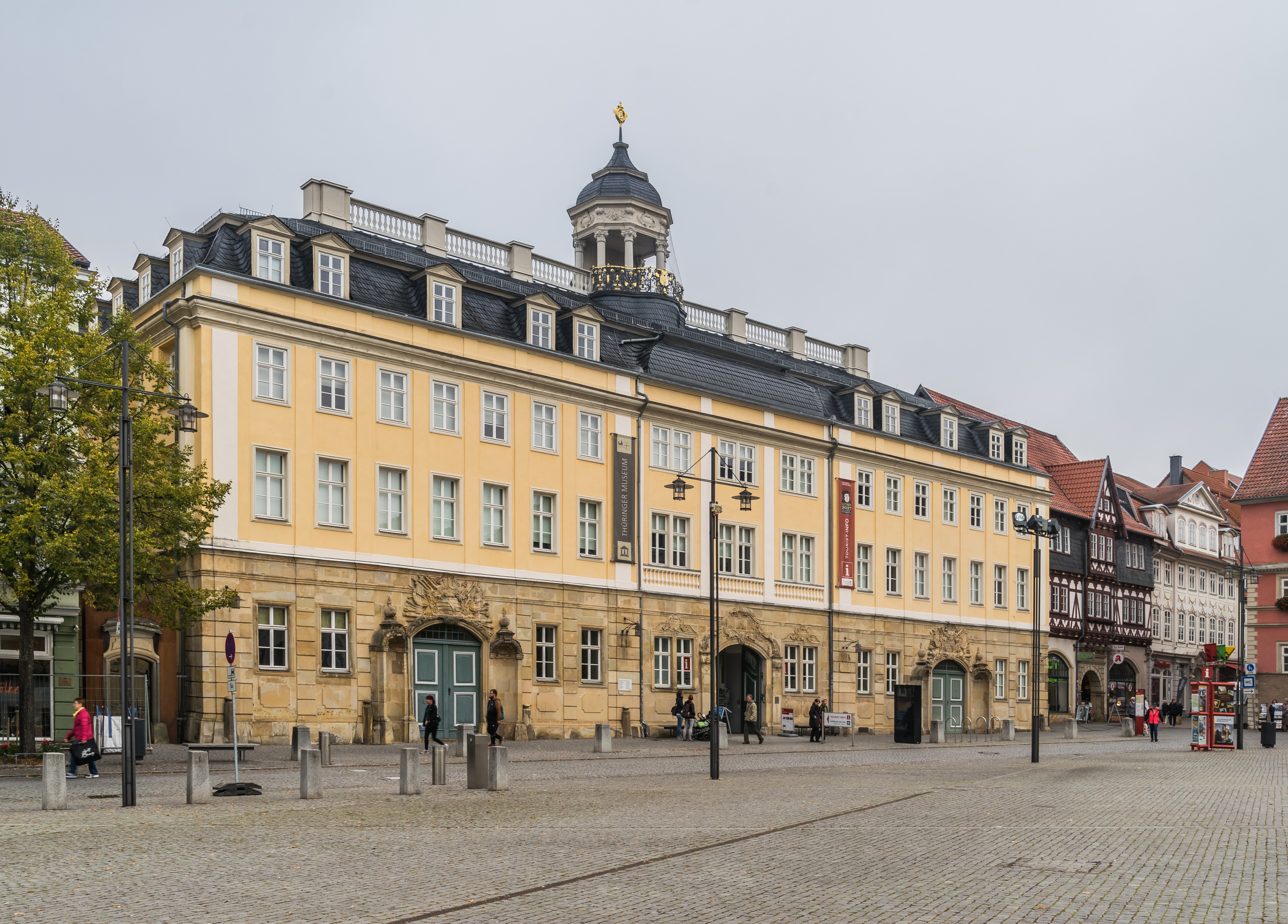
Ducal Palace of Eisenach

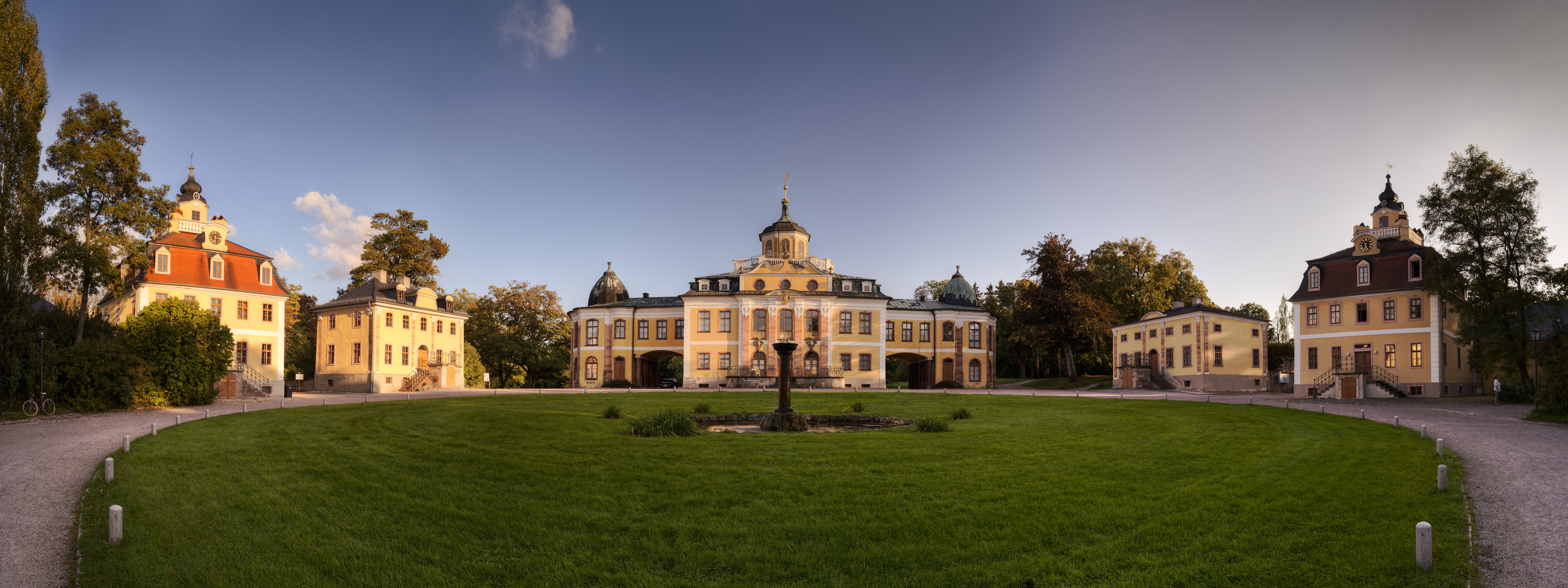
Schloss Belvedere, Weimar

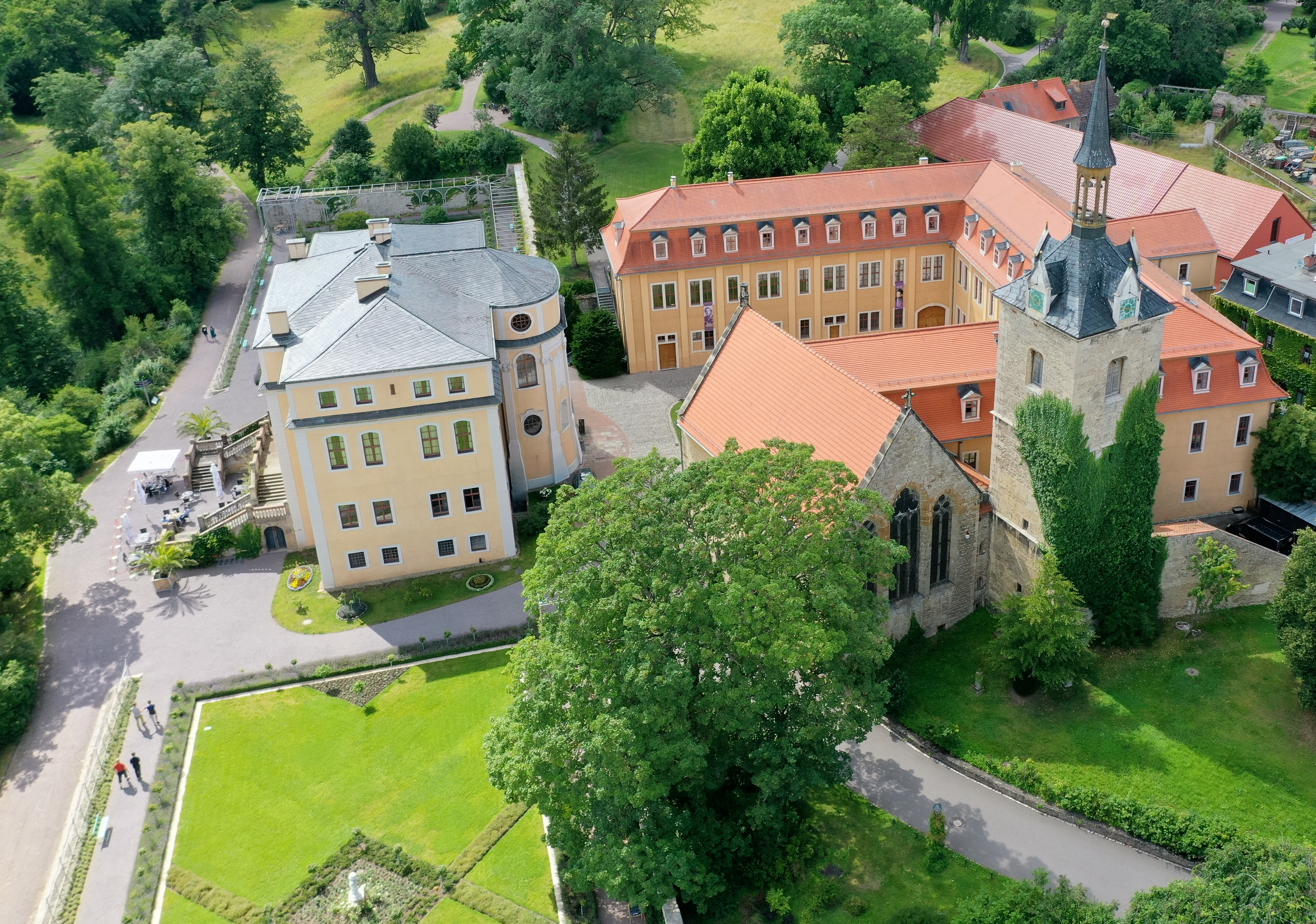
Schloss Ettersburg

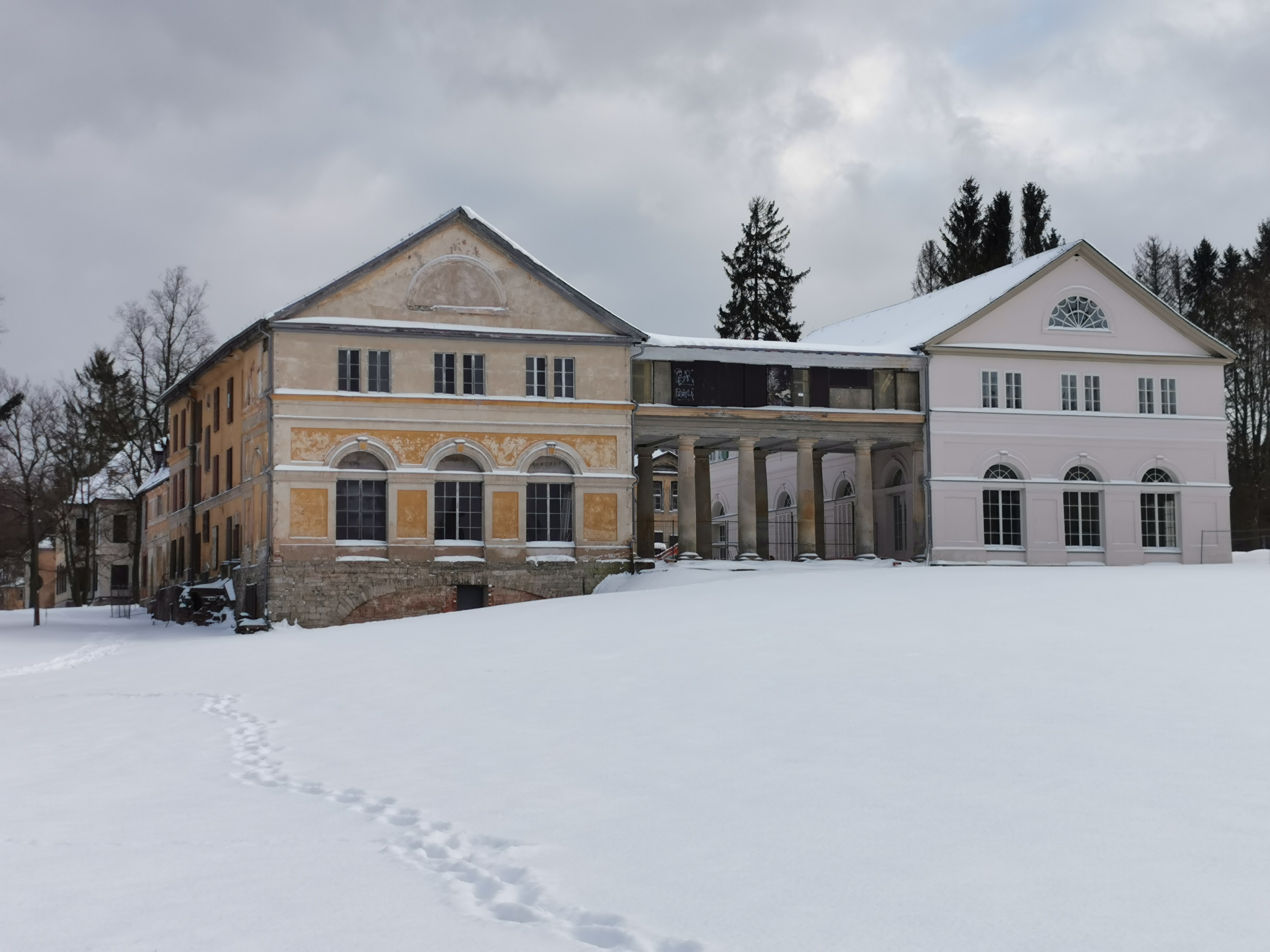
Schloss Wilhelmsthal, Gerstungen

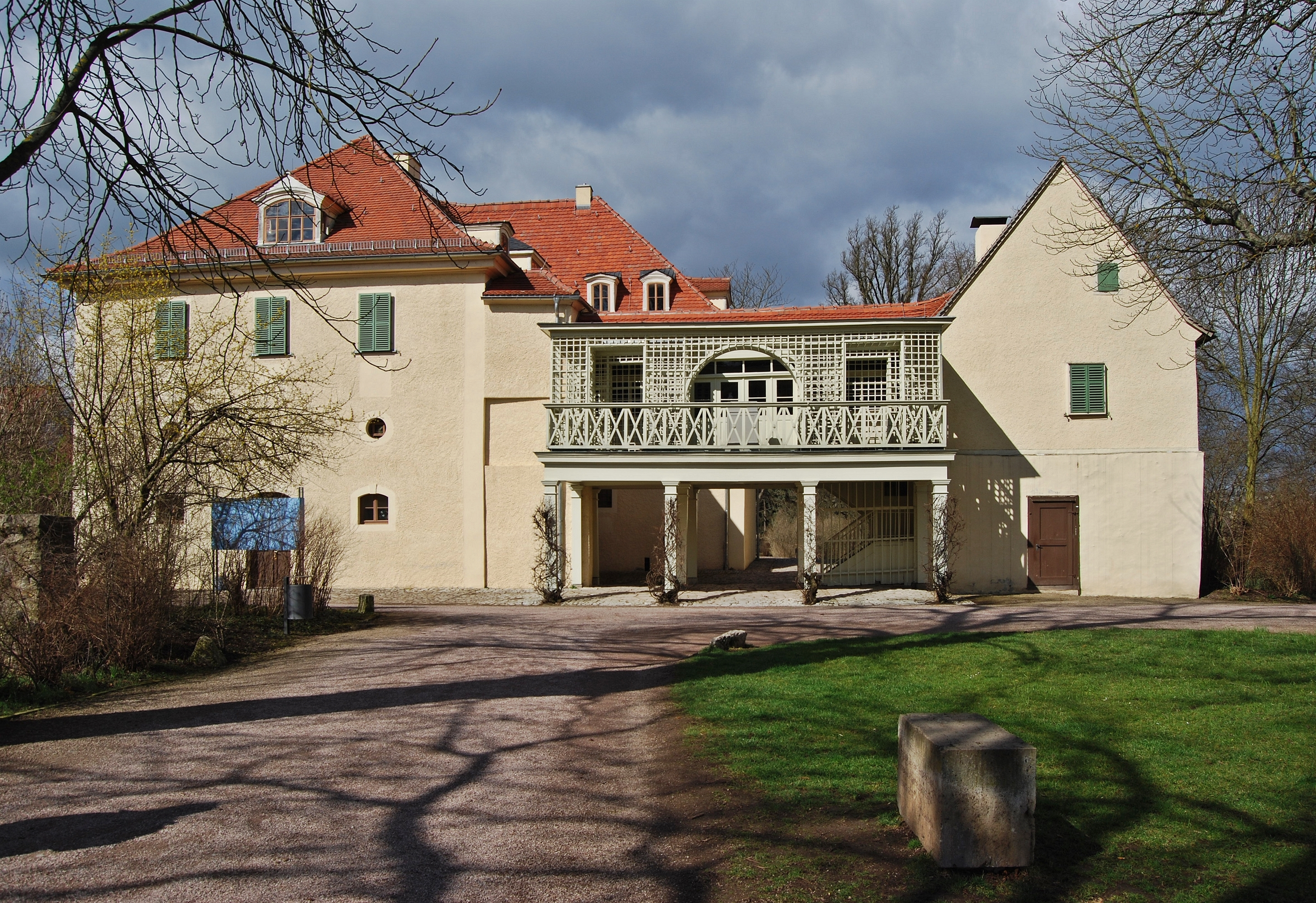
Tiefurt House

Branch of Saxe-Meiningen

- Saxe-Meiningen lines all shared common descent from Georg II, Duke of Saxe-Meiningen
  - Morganatic lines from Ernst, Prince of Saxe-Meiningen
  - Morganatic line from Bernhard, Prince of Saxe-Meiningen
  - Legitimate line from Bernhard, Prince of Saxe-Meiningen of whom only Prince Frederick Konrad of Saxe-Meiningen (Born on 14 April 1952) is still alive today.
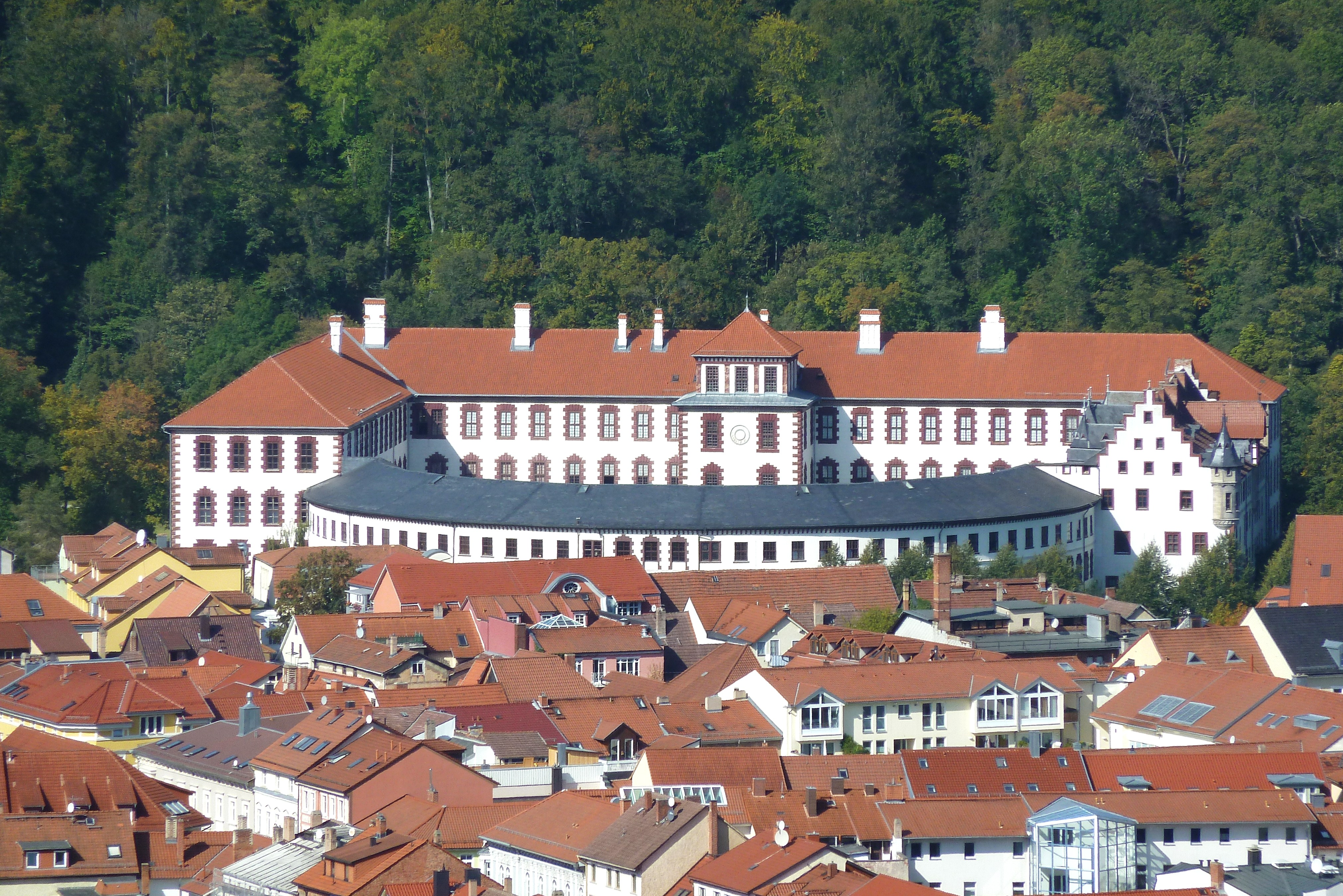
Elisabethenburg Palace, Meiningen, residence of the Duchy since 1682

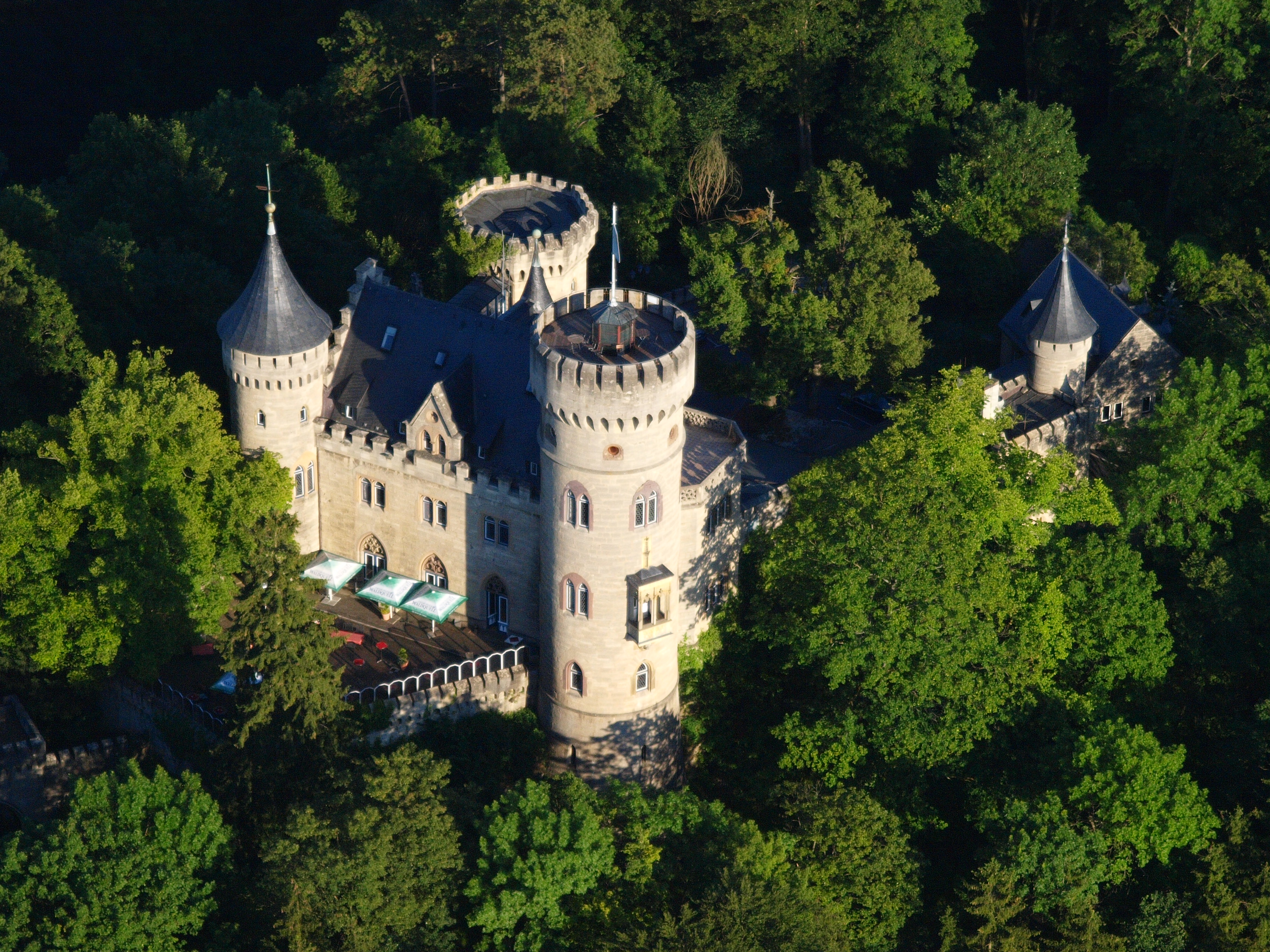
Schloss Landsberg, Meiningen

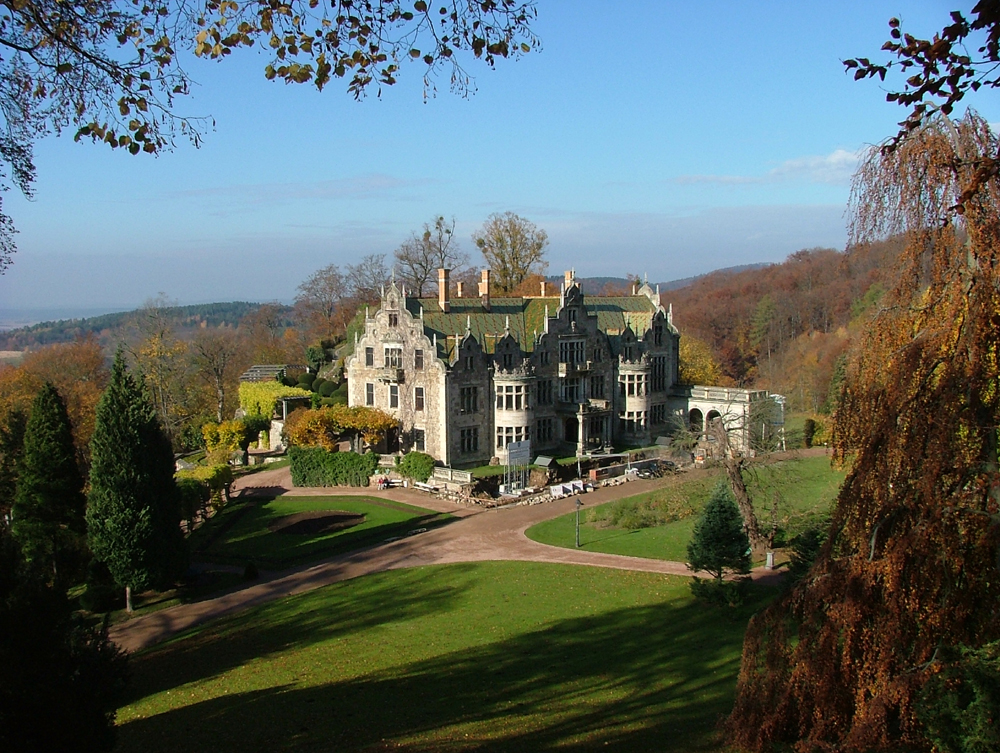
Altenstein Palace, hunting lodge of the Dukes of Meiningen

In the very likely event of the extinction of these two senior branches, the sole representation of the Ernestine Wettins will pass to the descendants of Francis, Duke of Saxe-Coburg-Saalfeld, who are the present Saxe-Coburg-Gothas led by Hubertus, Prince of Saxe-Coburg and Gotha (b. 16 September 1975), the House of Windsor, the Royal Family of Belgium and the Royal Family of Bulgaria. Francis and his nephew Ludwig Frederick Emil von Coburg are also ancestors to morganatic lines.

- Saxe-Coburg-Saalfeld, last common descent from Francis Josias, Duke of Saxe-Coburg-Saalfeld, further divided into:
  - Saxe-Coburg-Gotha, last common descent from Francis, Duke of Saxe-Coburg-Saalfeld, further divided into:
    - House of Windsor, last common descent from Albert, Prince Consort of the United Kingdom, as in 1863 Edward VII and his son, the future George V renounced his succession rights to the Duchy of Saxe-Coburg and Gotha, the succession fell into the line of the Duke of Albany.
      - Gloucester line Prince Richard, Duke of Gloucester
      - Kentian Line, from Prince George, Duke of Kent
    - Mainline (Albany) Saxe-Coburg-Gotha, from Charles Edward, Duke of Saxe-Coburg and Gotha who until 1919 was the Duke of Albany
    - House of Saxe-Coburg and Gotha-Koháry, last common descent from Prince August of Saxe-Coburg and Gotha
      - Morganatic descendants from Prince Philipp of Saxe-Coburg and Gotha (1901–1985)
      - Bulgarian royal family, all living members are descended from Simeon Saxe-Coburg-Gotha
    - House of Belgium, all living members share common descent from Albert II of Belgium. However, as absolute primogeniture is in effect in Belgium, if and on the ascension of Princess Elisabeth, Duchess of Brabant to the throne, the ruling house of Belgium will no longer be considered agnates to the House of Wettin
      - Eppinghoven, illegitimate agnatic branch to the House of Belgium from Leopold I of Belgium and Arcadie Claret
  - Morganatic line of Rohmann, from Prince Josias of Saxe-Coburg-Saalfeld marriage to a commoner, Therese Stroffeck
Grand Duchy of Saxe-Weimar-Eisenach

Duchy of Saxe-Meiningen

Duchy of Saxe-Coburg and Gotha

King of the Belgians

Duchy of Saxe-Altenburg

==== Extinct Ernestine branches ====
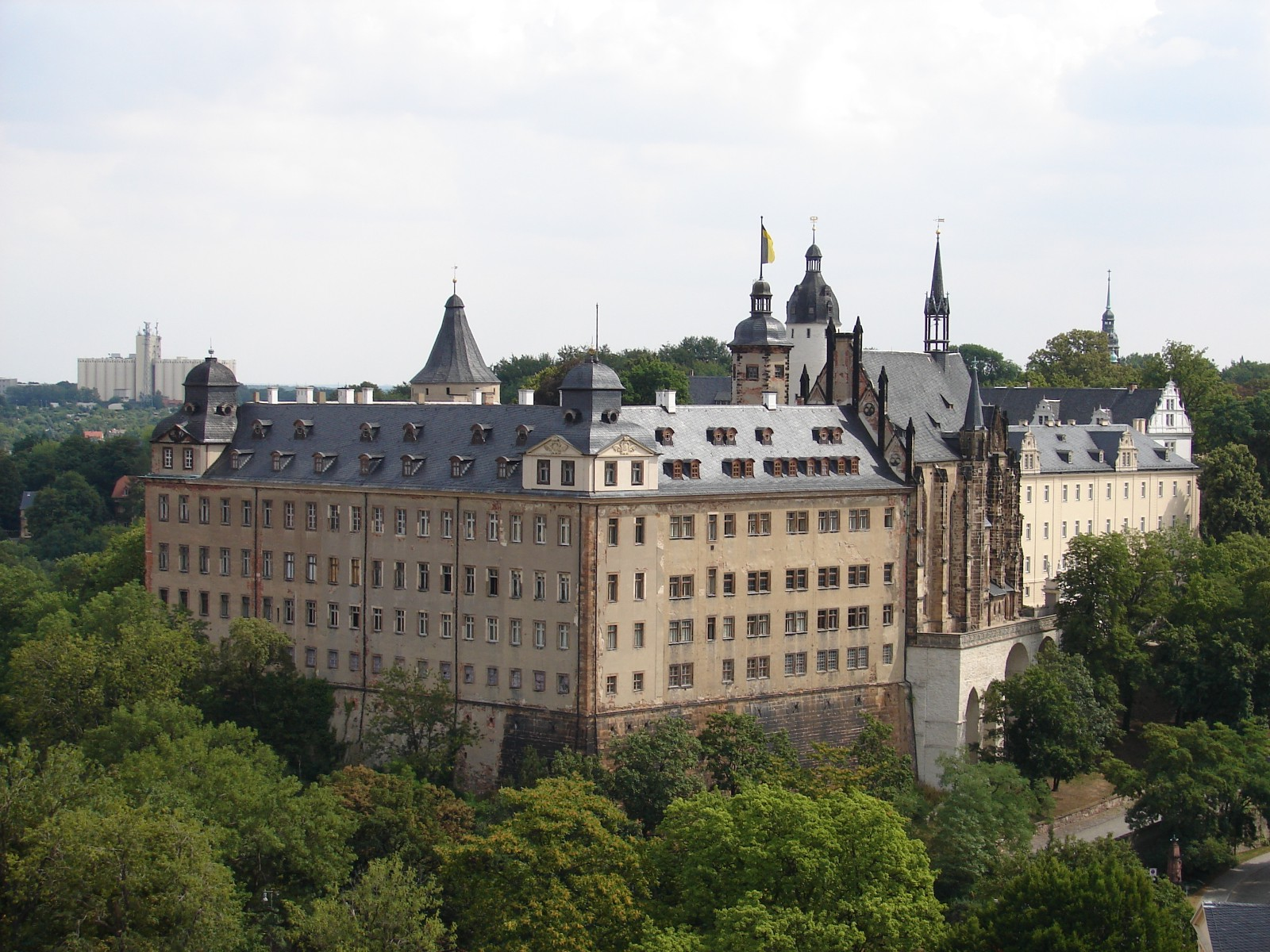
Castle of Altenburg

- Dukes of Saxe-Coburg
- Dukes of Saxe-Coburg-Saalfeld
- Dukes of Saxe-Altenburg (first line of Altenburg)
- Dukes of Saxe-Gotha-Altenburg (second line of Altenburg)
- Dukes of Saxe-Hildburghausen, then Dukes of Saxe-Altenburg (third line of Altenburg)
- Dukes of Saxe-Weimar
- Dukes of Saxe-Eisenach
- Dukes of Saxe-Coburg-Eisenach
- Dukes of Saxe-Jena
- Dukes of Saxe-Gotha
- Dukes of Saxe-Eisenberg
- Dukes of Saxe-Marksuhl
- Dukes of Saxe-Römhild
- Kings of Portugal and the Algarves (House of Braganza-Saxe-Coburg and Gotha)

=== Albertines ===
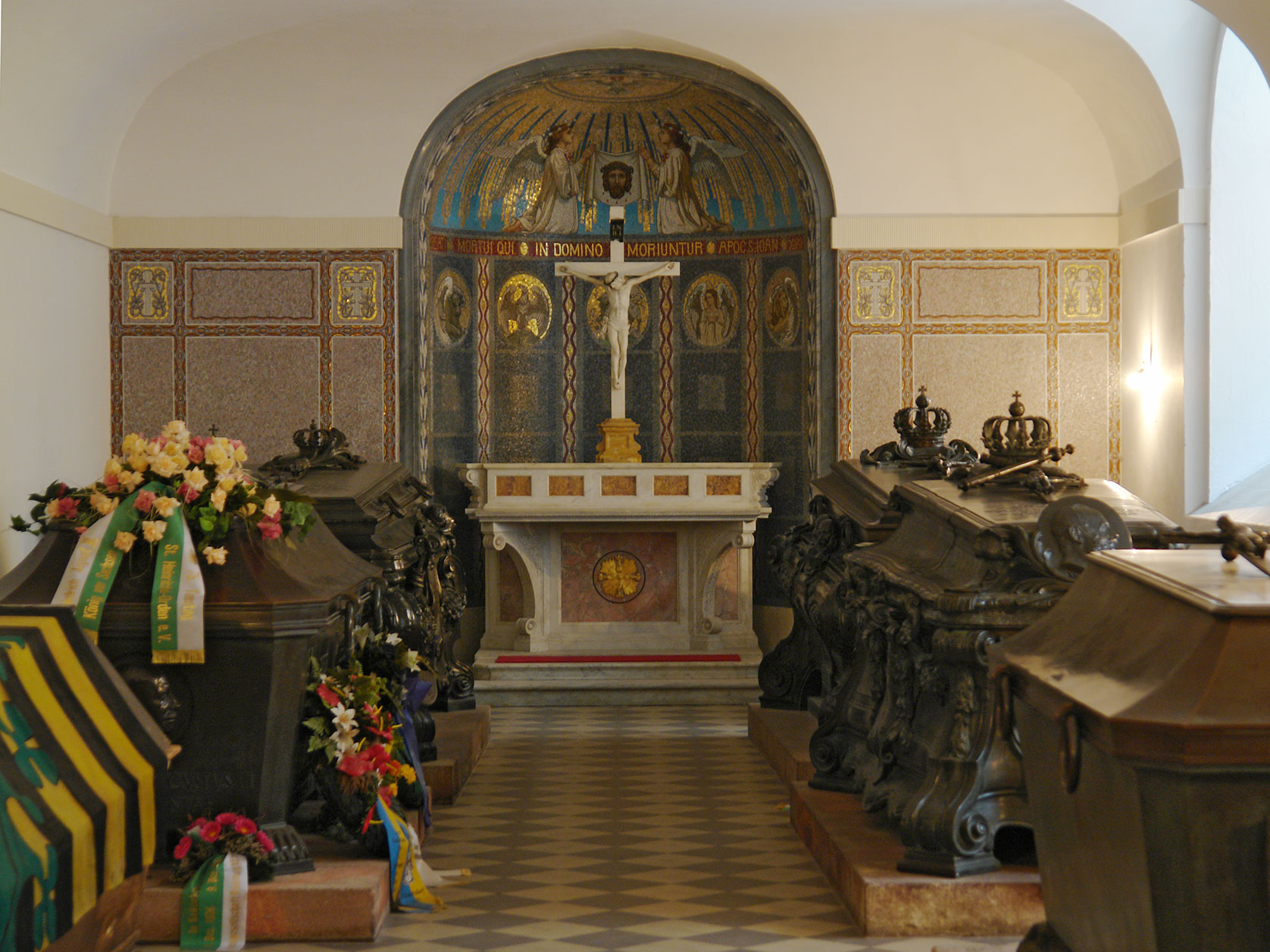
Catholic members of the Royal Albertine branch of the House of Wettin buried in the crypt chapel of the Katholische Hofkirche, Dresden

- Margraves of Meissen
- Grand Master of the Teutonic Order (1498–1510)
- Electors of Saxony and Arch-Marshals of the Holy Roman Empire (1547–1806)
- Kings of Poland and Grand Dukes of Lithuania (1697–1763)
- Duke of Courland and Semigallia (1758–1763)
- Duke of Teschen (1766–1822)
- Kings of Saxony (1806–1918), currently Prince/Princess of Saxony and Duke/Duchess of Saxony, with the head of the family also Margrave of Meissen
- Duke of Warsaw (1807–1815)

==== Existing Albertine branch ====
- Saxe-Gessaphe (cognatic)

==== Extinct Albertine branches ====
- Dukes of Saxe-Zeitz
- Dukes of Saxe-Merseburg
- Dukes of Saxe-Weissenfels
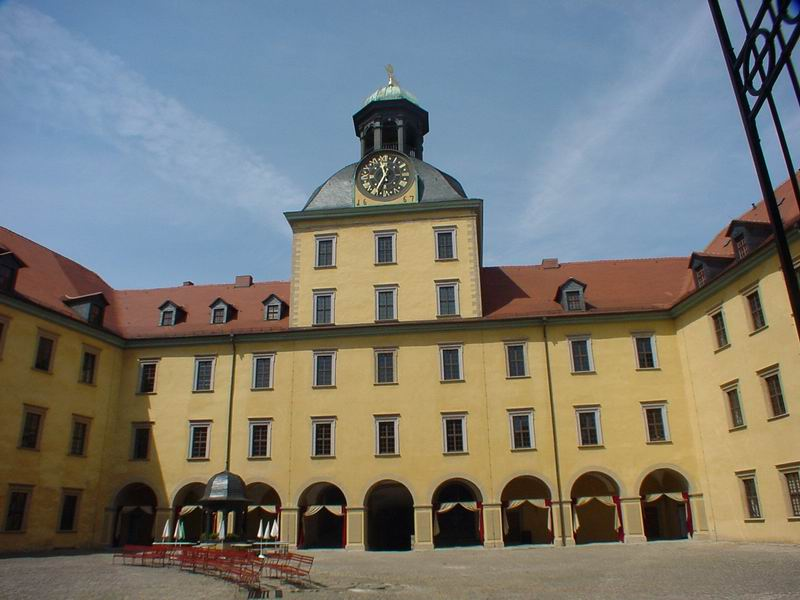
Moritzburg Palace in Zeitz

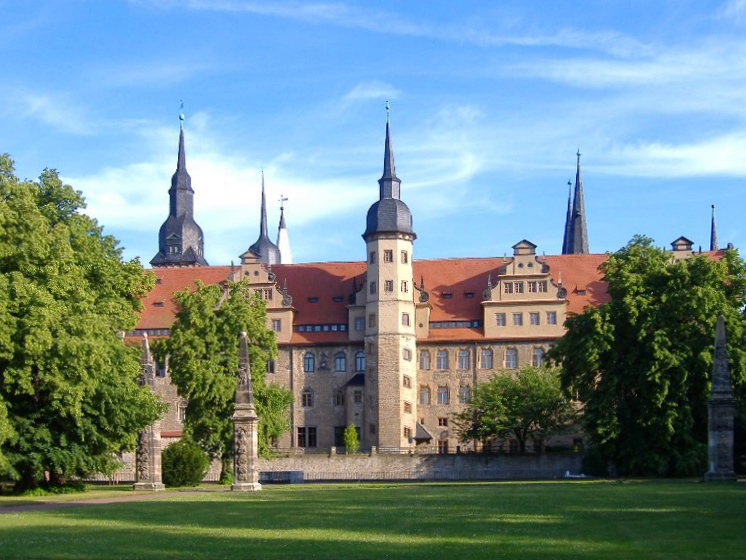
Merseburg Castle

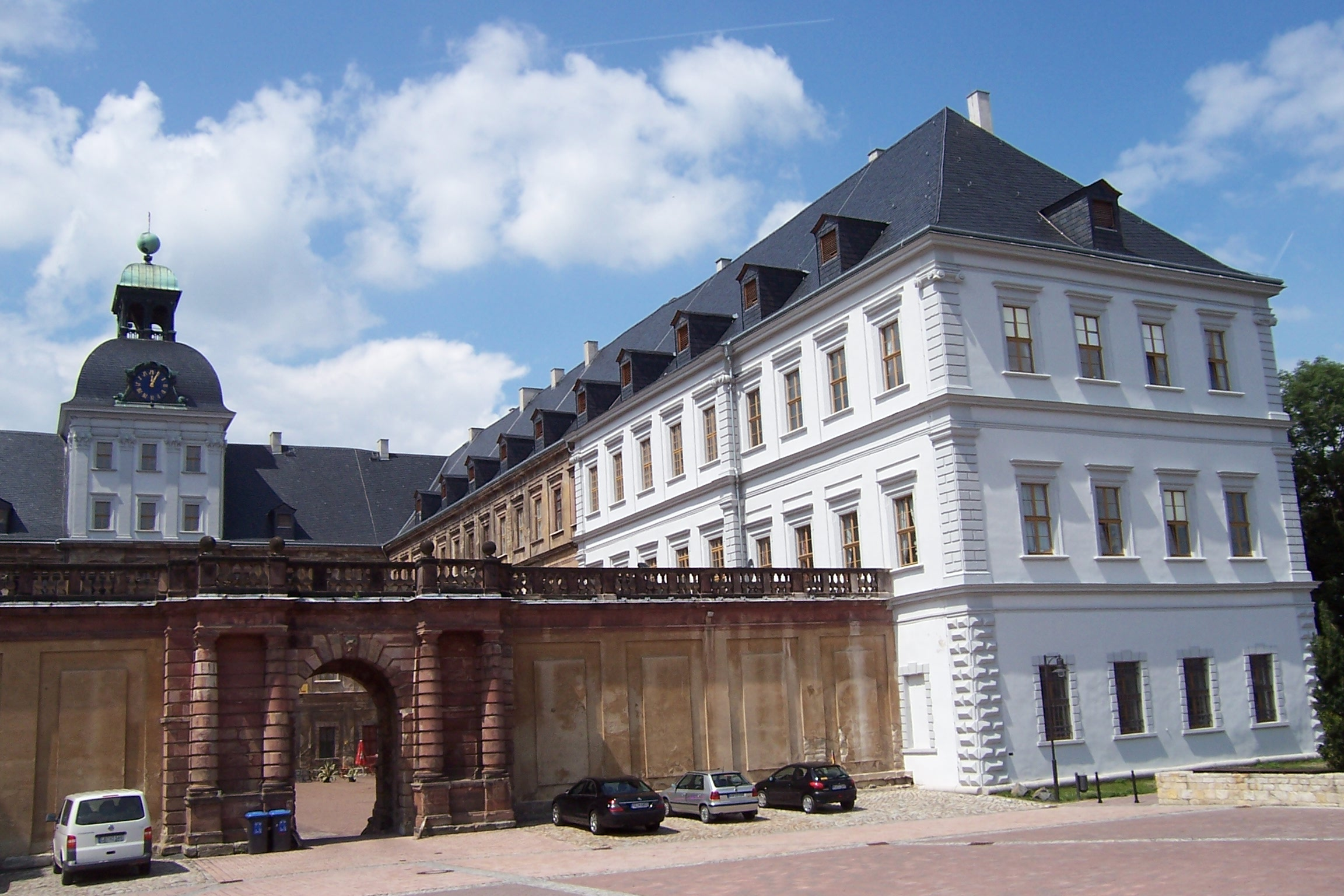
Neu-Augustusburg Castle, Weissenfels

== Family tree of the House of Wettin ==
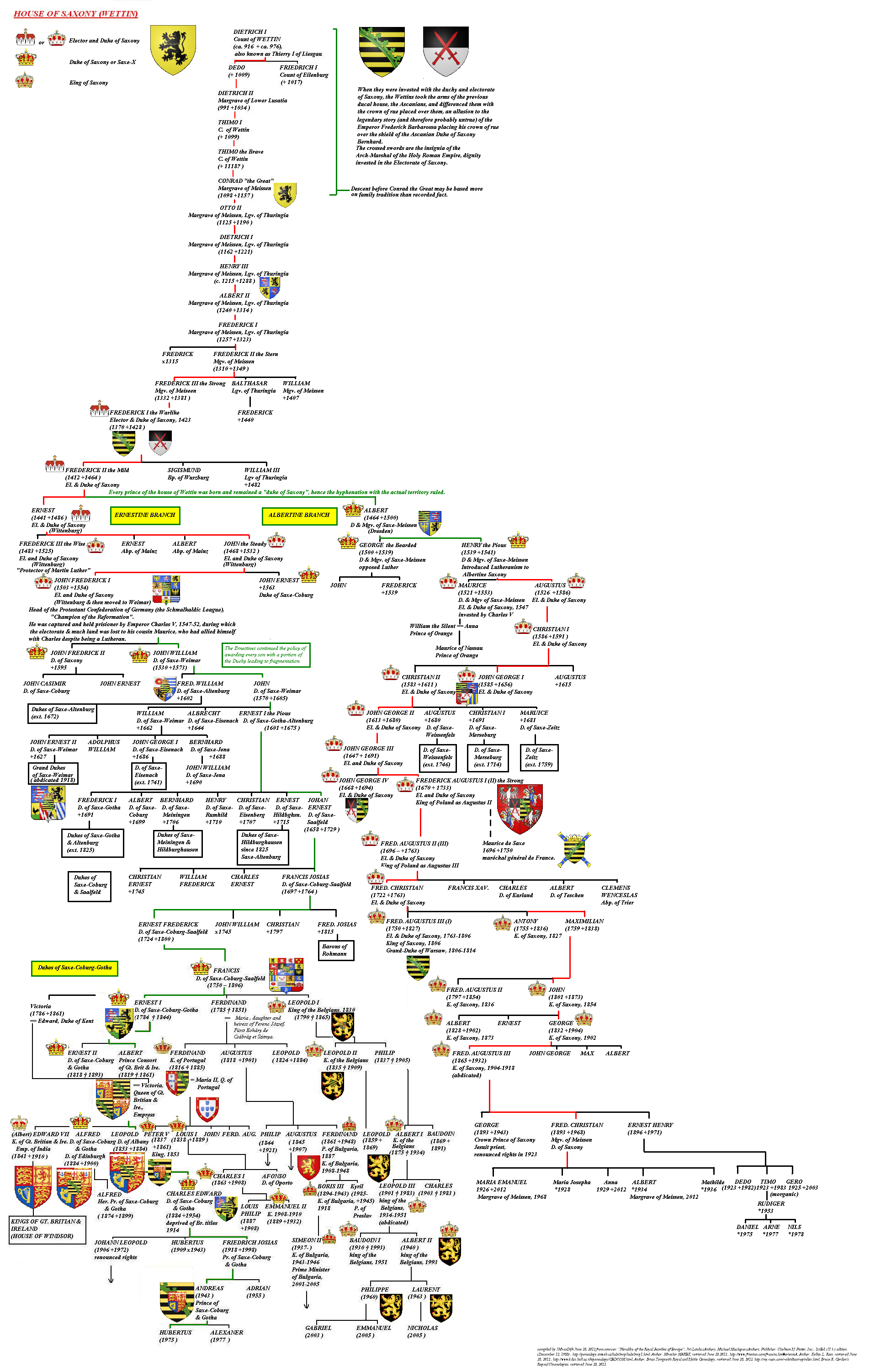
Family tree of the House of Wettin, the royal & ducal house of Saxony, and later Great Britain, Belgium, Portugal, and Bulgaria

== Rulers ==
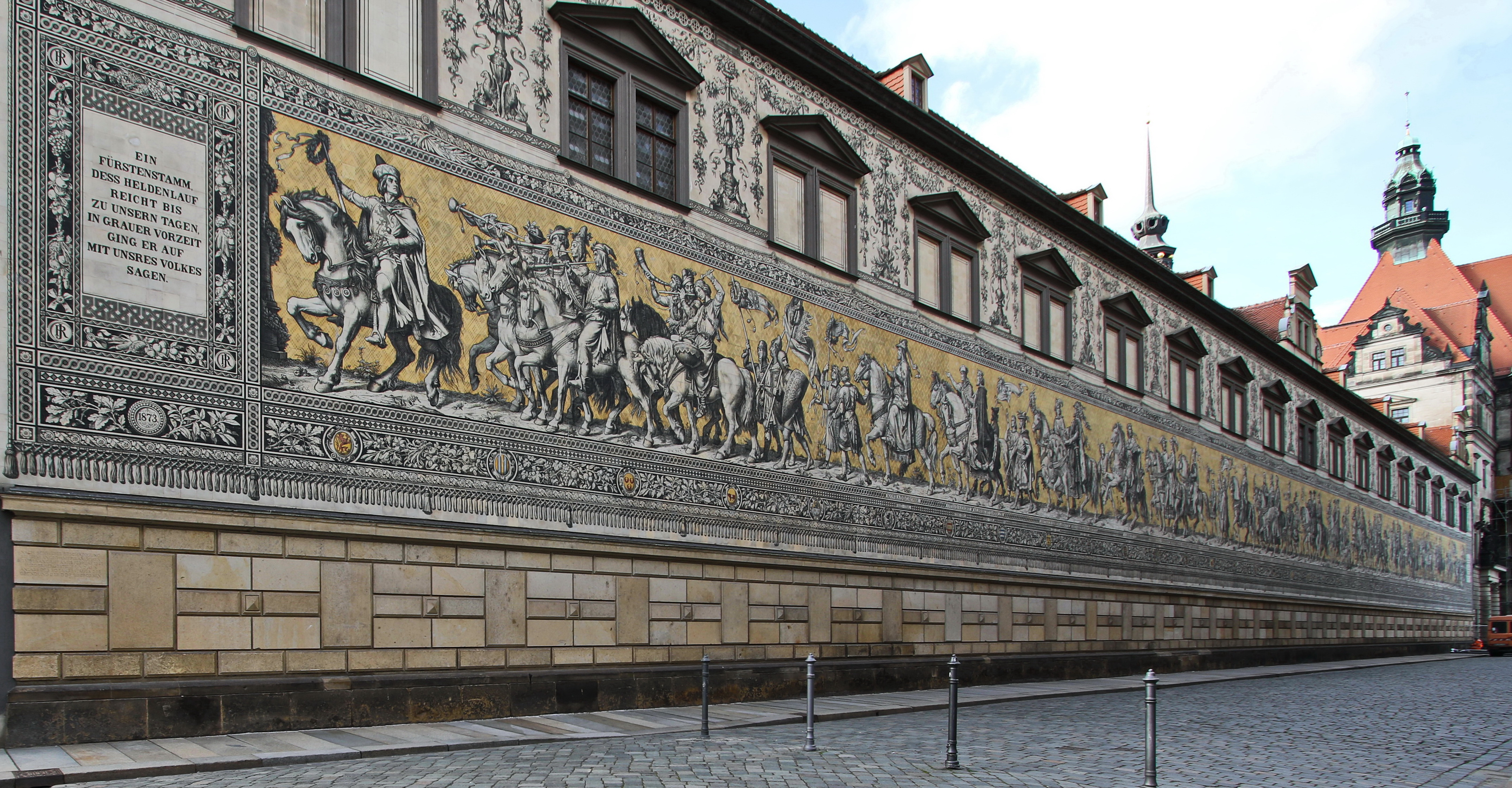
The Fürstenzug is a monumental painting and porcelain mural in Dresden, Germany, depicting a procession of the rulers of the House of Wettin, the dynasty that governed Saxony for nearly 800 years.
Partitions of the territories under House of Wettin rule

March of Lusatia (1st creation) (1034–1123)	County of Wettin (950–1288)
County of Brehna (1st creation) (1156–1217)	March of Lusatia (2nd creation) (1156–1210)	March of Meissen (1156–1195)
Meissen briefly under immediacy (direct control of the Holy Roman Empire) (1195–1198)
March of Meissen (1198–1423)
(Brehna line since 1217)	County of Brehna (2nd creation) (1267–1290)	March of Lusatia (3rd creation) (1288–1303)
Sold to the March of Brandenburg (1303–1347)
Annexed to the Archbishopric of Magdeburg	Annexed to the Duchy of Saxe-Wittenberg (1290–1423)
March of Landsberg (1349–1407)	Landgraviate of Thuringia (1349–1482)
Raised to: Electorate of Saxony (1423–1806)
Electorate of Saxony (1423–1806) (Ernestine Line until 1547; Albertine Line since 1547)	Duchy of Saxony (1464–1554) (Albertine Line until 1547; Ernestine Line since 1547)
Duchy of Coburg and Eisenach (1st creation) (1554–1566)	Duchy of Gotha (1554–1565)	Duchy of Weimar (1554–1741)
Duchy of Coburg and Eisenach (2nd creation) (1572–1638)
Duchy of Altenburg (1603–1672)
Duchy of Gotha (1605–1672)
Duchy of Zeitz (1656–1718)	Duchy of Merseburg (1656–1738)	Duchy of Weissenfels (1656–1746)
Duchy of Eisenach (1662–1741)	Duchy of Jena (1662–1690)
Renamed; Duchy of Gotha and Altenburg (1672–1826)
Duchy of Hildburghausen (1675–1826)	Duchy of Meiningen (1675–1918)	Duchy of Coburg and Saalfeld (1675–1826) Renamed; Duchy of Coburg and Gotha (1826–1918)
Duchy of Barby (1680–1739)
Duchy of Weimar (1554–1741)
Renamed; Duchy of Weimar and Eisenach (1741–1815) Raised to: Grand Duchy of Weimar and Eisenach (1815–1918)
Raised to: Kingdom of Saxony (1806–1918)
Renamed; Duchy of Altenburg (1826–1918)

Table of rulers

Ruler	Born	Reign	Ruling part	Consort	Death	Notes
Theodoric I	c.920 ?	c.950 – 976	County of Wettin	Judith of Magdeburg c.950 two children	976 aged 55–56	First known member of the family and first count of Wettin.
Dedo I	c.960 First son of Theodoric I and Judith of Magdeburg	976 – 13 November 1009	County of Wettin	Thietburga of Haldensleben c.980 one child	13 November 1009; Zörbig aged 48–49	Children of Theodoric, divided their inheritance. Eilenburg eventually rejoined Wettin after Frederick's death.
Frederick	c.960 Second son of Theodoric I and Judith of Magdeburg	976 – 5 January 1017	County of Wettin (at Eilenburg)	Unknown three children	5 January 1017; Eilenburg aged 56–57	Children of Theodoric, divided their inheritance. Eilenburg eventually rejoined Wettin after Frederick's death.
Theodoric II	c.980 Son of Dedo I and Thietburga of Haldensleben	13 November 1009 – 19 November 1034	County of Wettin	Matilda of Meissen c.1000 seven children	19 November 1034 aged 53–54	Since 1032 also Margrave of Lusatia.
Dedo II	1004; First son of Theodoric II and Matilda of Meissen	19 November 1034 – October 1075	March of Lusatia	Oda of East Ostmark c.1035 two children Adela of Leuven c.1055 two children	October 1075 aged 70–71	Children of Theodoric II, Dedo II and Thimo divided their inheritance. Since 1040, Dedo II associated his namesake son to his rule in Lusatia.
Dedo III the Younger	c.1035 Son of Dedo II and Oda of East Ostmark	1040 – 1069	March of Lusatia	Unmarried	1069 aged 33–34	Children of Theodoric II, Dedo II and Thimo divided their inheritance. Since 1040, Dedo II associated his namesake son to his rule in Lusatia.
Thimo the Brave	c.1030 Second son of Theodoric II and Matilda of Meissen	19 November 1034 – 9 March 1090	County of Wettin	Ida of Nordheim three children	9 March 1090 aged 59–60	Children of Theodoric II, Dedo II and Thimo divided their inheritance. Since 1040, Dedo II associated his namesake son to his rule in Lusatia.
Regency of Adela of Leuven (1075–1084)						
Henry I the Elder	1070; Son of Dedo II and Adela of Leuven	October 1075 – 1103	March of Lusatia (with Meissen since 1089)	Gertrude of Brunswick c.1090 one child	1103 aged 32–33	
Dedo IV	c.1070 First son of Thimo and Ida of Nordheim	9 March 1090 – 26 December 1124	County of Wettin	Bertha of Groitzsch c.1120 (annulled) one child	26 December 1124 aged 53–54	
Regency of Gertrude of Brunswick (1103–1117)						Posthumous son of his father, left no descendants.
Henry II the Younger	1103; Posthumous son of Henry I and Gertrude of Brunswick	1103 – October 1123	March of Lusatia (with Meissen)	Adelaide of Stade c.1120 no children	October 1123 aged 19–20	Posthumous son of his father, left no descendants.
Lusatia and Meissen fell under control of other families (1123–1136); Annexed again to Wettin in 1136
Conrad I the Great	c.1080? Second son of Thimo and Ida of Nordheim	26 December 1124 – 1156	County of Wettin (with March of Lusatia and Meissen since 1136)	Luitgard of Elchingen-Ravenstein (c.1104–1146); 1115 twelve children	5 February 1157; Petersberg aged 76–77?	Heirs of Dedo IV. Conrad abdicated in 1156 to his sons, who divided the county. Dedo's daughter Matilda's possessions were inherited by her descendants.
Matilda	c.1120? Daughter of Dedo IV and Bertha of Groitzsch	26 December 1124 – 9 January 1170	County of Wettin (at Leisnig and Colditz)	Rapoto, Count of Abenberg (c.1104–1146) c.1150 twelve children	9 January 1170 aged 49–50	Heirs of Dedo IV. Conrad abdicated in 1156 to his sons, who divided the county. Dedo's daughter Matilda's possessions were inherited by her descendants.
Otto the Rich	c.1125? First son of Conrad I and Luitgard of Elchingen-Ravenstein	1156 – 18 February 1190	March of Meissen	Hedwig of Brandenburg; 1155 four children	18 February 1190; Nossen aged 64–65	Children of Conrad I, divided their inheritance. After Theodoric's death with no descendants, the march of Lusatia was inherited by his brother Dedo.
Theodoric I	c.1125? Second son of Conrad I and Luitgard of Elchingen-Ravenstein	1156 – 9 February 1185	March of Lusatia	Dobroniega Ludgarda of Poland c.1145 two children	9 February 1185; Petersberg aged 59–60	Children of Conrad I, divided their inheritance. After Theodoric's death with no descendants, the march of Lusatia was inherited by his brother Dedo.
Dedo V the Fat	c.1125? Third son of Conrad I and Luitgard of Elchingen-Ravenstein	1156 – 16 August 1190	County of Groitzsch (until 1185) March of Lusatia (from 1185)	Matilda of Heinsberg c.1150 six children	16 August 1190 aged 64–65	Children of Conrad I, divided their inheritance. After Theodoric's death with no descendants, the march of Lusatia was inherited by his brother Dedo.
Henry I	c.1130? Fourth son of Conrad I and Luitgard of Elchingen-Ravenstein	1156 – 30 August 1181	County of Wettin	Sophia of Sommerschenburg (d.1195) c.1150 four children	30 August 1181 aged 57–58	Children of Conrad I, divided their inheritance. After Theodoric's death with no descendants, the march of Lusatia was inherited by his brother Dedo.
Frederick I	c.1130? Fifth son of Conrad I and Luitgard of Elchingen-Ravenstein	1156 – 4 January 1182	County of Brehna	Hedwig of Bohemia; 1165 three children	4 January 1182 aged 55–56	Children of Conrad I, divided their inheritance. After Theodoric's death with no descendants, the march of Lusatia was inherited by his brother Dedo.
Henry II	c.1150? First son of Henry I and Sophia of Sommerschenburg	30 August 1181 – 20 December 1187	County of Wettin	Unmarried	20 December 1187; Giebichenstein aged 36–37	
Hedwig of Bohemia	c.1150? Daughter of Theobald of Bohemia and Gertrude of Brandenburg	4 January 1182 – 19 February 1211	County of Brehna (at the town of Brehna)	Frederick I 1165 three children	19 February 1211 aged 60–61	Heirs of Frederick I. Otto shared the town of Brehna with his mother as widow seat.
Otto I	c.1165 First son of Frederick I and Hedwig of Bohemia	4 January 1182 – 23 December 1203	County of Brehna (in the remaining county)	Unmarried	23 December 1203; Brehna aged 37–38	Heirs of Frederick I. Otto shared the town of Brehna with his mother as widow seat.
Ulrich	c.1160? Second son of Henry I and Sophia of Sommerschenburg	20 December 1187 – 28 September 1206	County of Wettin	? of Winzenburg (1149–1204) c.1185 no children Hedwig of Saxony; 1205 one child	28 September 1206; Wettin aged 45–46	
Albert I the Proud	1158; First son of Otto and Hedwig of Brandenburg	18 February 1190 – 24 June 1195	March of Meissen	Sophia of Bohemia; 23 April 1186; Ústí nad Labem one child	24 June 1195; Halsbrücke aged 36–37	After his death, his lands were seized by Henry VI, Holy Roman Emperor. As he left no male descendants, the march, when recovered, passed to his brother.
Meissen briefly under direct rule of the Holy Roman Empire
Theodoric	c.1150 First son of Dedo V and Matilda of Heinsberg	16 August 1190 – 13 June 1207	March of Lusatia (at Groitzsch)	Judith of Thuringia; 1190 two children	13 June 1207 aged 56–57	Children of Dedo V, possibly divided the inheritance.
Conrad II	c.1150 Second son of Dedo V and Matilda of Heinsberg	16 August 1190 – 6 May 1210	March of Lusatia (at Eilenburg)	Elisabeth of Greater Poland; February 1180 three children	6 May 1210 aged 59–60	Children of Dedo V, possibly divided the inheritance.
Agnes	1152; Daughter of Dedo V and Matilda of Heinsberg	16 August 1190 – 25 March 1195	March of Lusatia (at Rochlitz)	Berthold IV, Duke of Merania; 1180 seven children	2 March 1195; Dießen am Ammersee aged 42–43	Children of Dedo V, possibly divided the inheritance.
Groitzsch and Eilenburg annexed to Meissen; Rochlitz annexed to the House of Andechs, but eventually returned to the House of Wettin
Theodoric I & II the Oppressed	11 March 1162; Second son of Otto and Hedwig of Brandenburg	1198 – 18 February 1221	March of Meissen	Judith of Thuringia; 1197 five children	18 February 1221; Nossen aged 58	
Regency of Hedwig of Saxony and Frederick II, Count of Brehna (1205–1217)						Died as a minor and left no descendants. After his death, Wettin was inherited by the Brehna line.
Henry III	1205; Son of Ulrich and Hedwig of Saxony	28 September 1206 – 25 March 1217	County of Wettin	Unmarried	25 March 1217 aged 11–12	Died as a minor and left no descendants. After his death, Wettin was inherited by the Brehna line.
Frederick II & I	c.1165? Second son of Frederick I and Hedwig of Bohemia	23 December 1203 – 25 March 1217	County of Brehna (in co-rulership since 1182)	Judith of Ziegenhain (d. 6 October 1220) c. 1190 four children	16 December 1221; Acre aged 60–61	Co-ruling in Brehna since 1182, with his brother Otto. Ruling alone since 1203, Frederick inherited the county of Wettin from his cousin Henry III.
Frederick II & I	c.1165? Second son of Frederick I and Hedwig of Bohemia	25 March 1217 – 16 December 1221	County of Wettin	Judith of Ziegenhain (d. 6 October 1220) c. 1190 four children	16 December 1221; Acre aged 60–61	Co-ruling in Brehna since 1182, with his brother Otto. Ruling alone since 1203, Frederick inherited the county of Wettin from his cousin Henry III.
Regency of Judith of Thuringia (1221–1223) and Louis IV, Landgrave of Thuringia (1221–1227); Regency of Albert I, Duke of Saxony (1227–1230)						In 1265, he informally divided his patrimony with his sons: Albert received rule over Thuingia and Theodoric over Landsberg, but as Theodoric predeceased his father, Albert divided, in 1288, the margraviate with his nephew, Frederick Tuta.
Henry III the Illustrious	1215; Meissen; Son of Theodoric I and Judith of Thuringia	18 February 1221 – 15 February 1288	March of Meissen	Constance of Austria; 1 May 1234 near Vienna two children Agnes of Bohemia; 1244 no children Elisabeth von Maltitz; 1270 two children	15 February 1288; Dresden aged 72–73	In 1265, he informally divided his patrimony with his sons: Albert received rule over Thuingia and Theodoric over Landsberg, but as Theodoric predeceased his father, Albert divided, in 1288, the margraviate with his nephew, Frederick Tuta.
Theodoric III	c.1190? First son of Frederick II & I and Judith of Ziegenhain	16 December 1221 – 11 July 1267	County of Wettin	Eudoxia of Masovia (c.1210–1250) c.1230 six children	11 July 1267 aged 76–77	Children of Frederick II, ruled jointly.
Otto II	c.1190? Second son of Frederick II & I and Judith of Ziegenhain	16 December 1221 – 1234	County of Wettin	Unmarried	1234 aged 43–44?	Children of Frederick II, ruled jointly.
Otto III	c.1230? First son of Theodoric III and Eudoxia of Masovia	11 July 1267 – 1288	County of Wettin	Unmarried	c.1290 aged 59–60	Children of Theodoric, divided their inheritance. Theodoric II's possessions were absorbed by the Templar Order, where he went. Otto's death with no descendants led to the absorption of the county by the Archbishopric of Magdeburg.
Conrad I	c.1230? Second son of Theodoric III and Eudoxia of Masovia	11 July 1267 – 26 March 1278	County of Brehna	Elisabeth of Saxe-Wittenberg c.1270 four children	26 March 1278 aged 47–48	Children of Theodoric, divided their inheritance. Theodoric II's possessions were absorbed by the Templar Order, where he went. Otto's death with no descendants led to the absorption of the county by the Archbishopric of Magdeburg.
Theodoric IV	c.1230? Third son of Theodoric and Eudoxia of Masovia	11 July 1267 – c.1270	County of Wettin (at Mücheln and Döblitz)	Unmarried	1272 aged 41–42	Children of Theodoric, divided their inheritance. Theodoric II's possessions were absorbed by the Templar Order, where he went. Otto's death with no descendants led to the absorption of the county by the Archbishopric of Magdeburg.
Wettin annexed to the Archbishopric of Magdeburg; Mücheln and Döblitz annexed to the Templar Order
Conrad II	c.1250? First son of Conrad I and Elisabeth of Saxe-Wittenberg	26 March 1278 – 1288	County of Brehna	Unmarried	1288 aged 37–38	Children of Conrad I, ruled jointly. Left no descendants, and their county was annexed to Saxe-Wittenberg.
Otto IV	c.1250? Second son of Conrad I and Elisabeth of Saxe-Wittenberg	26 March 1278 – 1290	County of Brehna	Unmarried	1290; Erfurt aged 39–40	Children of Conrad I, ruled jointly. Left no descendants, and their county was annexed to Saxe-Wittenberg.
Brehna annexed to Saxe-Wittenberg
Albert II the Degenerate	1240; Son of Henry III and Constance of Austria	15 February 1288 – 1307	March of Meissen (in Thuringia only since 1291)	Margaret of Sicily; June 1255 five children Kunigunde of Eisenberg; 1272 (having an affair since 1269) two children Elisabeth of Weimar-Orlamünde; 1 October 1290 no children	20 November 1314; Erfurt aged 73–74	Following the formal division made by his father, it was expected for both sons of Henry to divide Meissen between them, but Theodoric preceded his father; it was his son Frederick Tuta who made the true division of power with his uncle Albert after Henry III's death. The marriage of Albert II with his previous lover and his estrangement with his legitimate sons led to a succession crisis that led to Albert's deposition, but Albert kept his power in Thuringia, which he was also forced to surrender in 1307. After said deposition, and Frederick Tuta's death with no descendants (1291), the sons of Albert II (Frederick I and Theodoric III) redivided Meissen.
Frederick Tuta	1269; Son of Theodoric of Landsberg and Helene of Brandenburg	15 February 1288 – 16 August 1291	March of Lusatia	Catharina of Bavaria; 1155 four children	16 August 1291; Nossen aged 64–65	
Frederick I the Brave	1257; Eisenach; First son of Albert II and Margaret of Sicily	16 August 1291 – 16 November 1323	March of Meissen (with Thuringia since 1307)	Agnes of Gorizia-Tyrol; 1 January 1286; Vienna one child Elisabeth of Lobdeburg-Arnshaugk; 24 August 1301; Gotha two children	16 November 1323; Eisenach aged 65–66	Children of Albert II, deposed their father, and, aftet their cousin's death, divided the whole patrimony between them. In 1303, Theodoric sold his property to the Margraviate of Brandenburg.
Theodoric III	1260; Second son of Albert II and Margaret of Sicily	16 August 1291 – 1303	March of Lusatia	Judith of Henneberg-Schleusingen (d.1315); 1295 no children	10 November 1307; Leipzig aged 46–47	Children of Albert II, deposed their father, and, aftet their cousin's death, divided the whole patrimony between them. In 1303, Theodoric sold his property to the Margraviate of Brandenburg.
Lusatia annexed to the Margraviate of Brandenburg
Regency of Elisabeth of Lobdeburg-Arnshaugk (1323–1329)						
Frederick II the Serious	30 November 1310; Gotha; Son of Frederick I and Elisabeth of Lobdeburg-Arnshaugk	16 November 1323 – 18 November 1349	March of Meissen	Matilda of Bavaria; May 1323; Nuremberg nine children	18 November 1349; Wartburg aged 38	
Frederick III the Strict	14 December 1332; Dresden; First son of Frederick II and Matilda of Bavaria	18 November 1349 – 21 May 1381	March of Meissen	Catherine of Henneberg; 1346 four children	21 May 1381; Altenburg aged 48	
Balthasar	21 December 1336; Weißenfels; Second son of Frederick II and Matilda of Bavaria	21 May 1381 – 18 May 1406	Landgraviate of Thuringia	Margaret of Nuremberg; Spring 1374 two children Anna of Saxe-Wittenberg; 1404 no children	18 May 1406; Wartburg aged 69	Following Frederick III's death, his heirs made the Division of Chemnitz, which divided the property of the family between surviving brothers and sons of the deceased margrave. After the Wittenberg line of the Ascanians became extinct, the Electorate of Saxony was given to Frederick IV, one of the sons of Frederick III. William I's property (given he died with no children) fell to his nephews from Landsberg.
William I the One-eyed	19 December 1343; Dresden; Third son of Frederick II and Matilda of Bavaria	21 May 1381 – 9 February 1407	March of Meissen	Elisabeth of Moravia; 1390 no children Anna of Brunswick-Göttingen; 1403 no children	9 February 1407; Grimma aged 63	Following Frederick III's death, his heirs made the Division of Chemnitz, which divided the property of the family between surviving brothers and sons of the deceased margrave. After the Wittenberg line of the Ascanians became extinct, the Electorate of Saxony was given to Frederick IV, one of the sons of Frederick III. William I's property (given he died with no children) fell to his nephews from Landsberg.
Regency of Catherine of Henneberg (1381–1384)						Following Frederick III's death, his heirs made the Division of Chemnitz, which divided the property of the family between surviving brothers and sons of the deceased margrave. After the Wittenberg line of the Ascanians became extinct, the Electorate of Saxony was given to Frederick IV, one of the sons of Frederick III. William I's property (given he died with no children) fell to his nephews from Landsberg.
Frederick IV & I the Warlike	11 April 1370; Dresden; First son of Frederick III and Catherine of Henneberg	21 November 1381 – 4 January 1428	March of Landsberg	Catherine of Brunswick-Lüneburg; 7 February 1402 seven children	4 January 1428; Altenburg aged 57	Following Frederick III's death, his heirs made the Division of Chemnitz, which divided the property of the family between surviving brothers and sons of the deceased margrave. After the Wittenberg line of the Ascanians became extinct, the Electorate of Saxony was given to Frederick IV, one of the sons of Frederick III. William I's property (given he died with no children) fell to his nephews from Landsberg.
Frederick IV & I the Warlike	11 April 1370; Dresden; First son of Frederick III and Catherine of Henneberg	6 January 1423 – 4 January 1428	Duchy of Saxony and Electorate of Saxony	Catherine of Brunswick-Lüneburg; 7 February 1402 seven children	4 January 1428; Altenburg aged 57	Following Frederick III's death, his heirs made the Division of Chemnitz, which divided the property of the family between surviving brothers and sons of the deceased margrave. After the Wittenberg line of the Ascanians became extinct, the Electorate of Saxony was given to Frederick IV, one of the sons of Frederick III. William I's property (given he died with no children) fell to his nephews from Landsberg.
William II the Rich	23 April 1371; Dresden; Second son of Frederick III and Catherine of Henneberg	21 May 1381 – 13 March 1425	March of Meissen (co-ruling in the Margraviate of Landsberg until 1407)	Amelia of Masovia; 16 May 1413; Brześć Kujawski (by proxy) no children	13 March 1425 aged 53	Following Frederick III's death, his heirs made the Division of Chemnitz, which divided the property of the family between surviving brothers and sons of the deceased margrave. After the Wittenberg line of the Ascanians became extinct, the Electorate of Saxony was given to Frederick IV, one of the sons of Frederick III. William I's property (given he died with no children) fell to his nephews from Landsberg.
George	1380; Dresden; Third son of Frederick III and Catherine of Henneberg	21 May 1381 – 9 December 1401	March of Landsberg	Unmarried	9 December 1401; Coburg aged 20–21	Following Frederick III's death, his heirs made the Division of Chemnitz, which divided the property of the family between surviving brothers and sons of the deceased margrave. After the Wittenberg line of the Ascanians became extinct, the Electorate of Saxony was given to Frederick IV, one of the sons of Frederick III. William I's property (given he died with no children) fell to his nephews from Landsberg.
Meissen and Landsberg fell to the Electorate of Saxony
Frederick IV the Peaceful	c.1380 Weißenfels; Son of Balthasar and Margaret of Nuremberg	18 May 1406 – 7 May 1440	Landgraviate of Thuringia	Anna of Schwarzburg-Sondershausen; 1407 no children	7 May 1440; Weißensee aged 59–60	
Frederick II the Gentle	22 April 1412; Leipzig; First son of Frederick IV & I and Catherine of Brunswick-Lüneburg	4 January 1428 – 7 September 1464	Duchy of Saxony and Electorate of Saxony (with Thuringia in 1440–1445)	Margaret of Austria; 3 June 1431; Leipzig eight children	7 September 1464; Leipzig aged 52	Children of Frederick I, had different inheritances. Frederick was the sole inheritor of the Electorate, but also inherited also Thuringia from his cousin Frederick IV, but gave it to his brother William a few years later. After William's death with no children, Thuringia merged in the Electorate.
William III the Brave	30 April 1425; Meissen; Second son of Frederick IV & I and Catherine of Brunswick-Lüneburg	1445 – 17 September 1482	Landgraviate of Thuringia	Anna of Austria; 2 June 1446 no children	17 September 1482; Weimar aged 57	Children of Frederick I, had different inheritances. Frederick was the sole inheritor of the Electorate, but also inherited also Thuringia from his cousin Frederick IV, but gave it to his brother William a few years later. After William's death with no children, Thuringia merged in the Electorate.
Thuringia annexed to the Electorate of Saxony
Ernest I	24 March 1441; Meissen; First son of Frederick II and Margaret of Austria	7 September 1464 – 26 August 1486	Electorate of Saxony (Ernestine line)	Elisabeth of Bavaria-Munich; 25 November 1460; Leipzig seven children	26 August 1486; Colditz Castle aged 45	Children of Frederick II, divided their patrimony. Ernest, as the eldest, inherited the Electoral dignity. Ernest founded the Ernestine line of Saxon princes, and Albert was the founder of the Albertine line.
Albert III the Bold	27 January 1443; Grimma; Second son of Frederick II and Margaret of Austria	7 September 1464 – 12 September 1500	Duchy of Saxony (Albertine line)	Sidonie of Poděbrady; 11 November 1464; Cheb nine children	12 September 1500; Emden aged 57	Children of Frederick II, divided their patrimony. Ernest, as the eldest, inherited the Electoral dignity. Ernest founded the Ernestine line of Saxon princes, and Albert was the founder of the Albertine line.
Frederick III the Wise	17 January 1463; Torgau; First son of Ernest I and Elisabeth of Bavaria-Munich	26 August 1486 – 5 May 1525	Electorate of Saxony (Ernestine line; at Wittenberg)	Unmarried	5 May 1525; Annaburg aged 62	Children of Ernest, ruled jointly, with different seats from 1513. Frederick was a protector of Martin Luther, but a lifelong Catholic. John established Lutheranism officially in 1527.
John I the Steadfast	30 June 1468; Meissen; Second son of Ernest I and Elisabeth of Bavaria-Munich	26 August 1486 – 16 August 1532	Electorate of Saxony (Ernestine line; at Weimar)	Sophie of Mecklenburg; 1 March 1500; Torgau one child Margaret of Anhalt-Köthen; 13 November 1513; Torgau four children	16 August 1532; Schweinitz aged 64	Children of Ernest, ruled jointly, with different seats from 1513. Frederick was a protector of Martin Luther, but a lifelong Catholic. John established Lutheranism officially in 1527.
George the Bearded	27 August 1471; Dresden; First son of Albert III and Sidonie of Poděbrady	12 September 1500 – 17 April 1539	Duchy of Saxony (Albertine line)	Barbara of Poland; 21 November 1496; Dresden ten children	17 April 1539; Dresden aged 67	Proponent of Catholic Reform and a staunch opponent of Martin Luther. Left no surviving male descendants. He was succeeded by his brother Henry.
John Frederick I the Magnanimous	30 June 1503; Torgau; Son of John I and Sophie of Mecklenburg	16 August 1532 – 3 March 1554	Electorate of Saxony (Ernestine line; until 1547) Duchy of Saxony (Ernestine line; from 1547)	Sibylle of Cleves; 9 February 1527; Torgau four children	3 March 1554; Weimar aged 50	Children of John I, ruled jointly. John Ernest ruled a separate part of the Electorate as Duke, never having held the Electoral dignity. John Frederick lost his Electoral dignity and territory to his cousin Maurice after being defeated by the Emperor in the Schmalkaldic War. He was left with some territories as the Duchy of Saxony. Coburg re-merged in the Saxon duchy after John Ernest's death. After John Frederick's death the Duchy of Saxony was divided between his three sons.
John Ernest I	10 May 1521; Coburg; Son of John I and Margaret of Anhalt-Köthen	16 August 1532 – 8 February 1553	Duchy of Saxony (Ernestine line; at Coburg)	Catherine of Brunswick-Grubenhagen; 12 February 1542; Torgau no children	8 February 1553; Coburg aged 31	Children of John I, ruled jointly. John Ernest ruled a separate part of the Electorate as Duke, never having held the Electoral dignity. John Frederick lost his Electoral dignity and territory to his cousin Maurice after being defeated by the Emperor in the Schmalkaldic War. He was left with some territories as the Duchy of Saxony. Coburg re-merged in the Saxon duchy after John Ernest's death. After John Frederick's death the Duchy of Saxony was divided between his three sons.
Henry IV the Pious	16 March 1473; Dresden; Second son of Albert III and Sidonie of Poděbrady	17 April 1539 – 18 August 1541	Duchy of Saxony (Albertine line)	Catherine of Mecklenburg; 9 January 1541; Marburg nine children	18 August 1541; Dresden aged 68	Succeeded his brother George. He established Lutheranism in Albertine Saxony.
Maurice	21 March 1521; Freiberg; First son of Henry IV and Catherine of Mecklenburg	18 August 1541 – 9 July 1553	Duchy of Saxony (Albertine line; until 1547) Electorate of Saxony (Albertine line; from 1547)	Agnes of Hesse; 9 January 1541; Marburg two children	9 July 1553; Lehrte aged 32	Though a Lutheran, allied with Emperor Charles V against the Schmalkaldic League. Gained the Electorate for the Albertine line in 1547 after Charles V's victory at the Battle of Mühlberg. Left no male descendants. He was succeeded by his brother Augustus.
Following their displacement by the Albertines, the Ernestine branch of the Wettins continued to rule in southern Thuringia as "Dukes of Saxony", but their lands eventually split up into many different tiny Ernestine duchies.
Augustus I	31 July 1526; Freiberg; Second son of Henry IV and Catherine of Mecklenburg	9 July 1553 – 11 February 1586	Electorate of Saxony	Anna of Denmark; 7 October 1548; Torgau fifteen children Agnes Hedwig of Anhalt; 3 January 1586; Dessau no children	11 February 1586; Dresden aged 59	Recognized as Elector by the ousted John Frederick I in 1554.
John Frederick II	8 January 1529; Torgau; First son of John Frederick I and Sibylle of Cleves	3 March 1554 – November 1566	Duchy of Coburg and Eisenach	Agnes of Hesse; 26 May 1555; Weimar no children Elisabeth of the Palatinate-Simmern-Sponheim; 12 June 1558; Weimar four children	19 May 1595; Lamberg Castle aged 66	Children of John Frederick I, divided their inheritance. John Frederick III's domain went to his elder brother John Frederick II. He, however, was placed under imperial ban with intervention of his brother John William, who seized the opportunity to reunite all Saxony under his domain. However, in 1572, the Division of Erfurt forced him to redivide Saxony with his nephews, sons of his imprisoned brother, who received thei father's domain at Coburg and Eisenach.
John William	11 March 1530; Torgau; Second son of John Frederick I and Sibylle of Cleves	3 March 1554 – 2 March 1573	Duchy of Weimar	Dorothea Susanne of the Palatinate-Simmern; 15 June 1560; Heidelberg five children	2 March 1573; Weimar aged 42	Children of John Frederick I, divided their inheritance. John Frederick III's domain went to his elder brother John Frederick II. He, however, was placed under imperial ban with intervention of his brother John William, who seized the opportunity to reunite all Saxony under his domain. However, in 1572, the Division of Erfurt forced him to redivide Saxony with his nephews, sons of his imprisoned brother, who received thei father's domain at Coburg and Eisenach.
John Frederick III the Younger	16 January 1538; Torgau; Third son of John Frederick I and Sibylle of Cleves	3 March 1554 – 21 October 1565	Duchy of Gotha	Unmarried	21 October 1565; Jena aged 27	Children of John Frederick I, divided their inheritance. John Frederick III's domain went to his elder brother John Frederick II. He, however, was placed under imperial ban with intervention of his brother John William, who seized the opportunity to reunite all Saxony under his domain. However, in 1572, the Division of Erfurt forced him to redivide Saxony with his nephews, sons of his imprisoned brother, who received thei father's domain at Coburg and Eisenach.
Gotha annexed to Coburg and Eisenach
Coburg and Eisenach briefly annexed to Weimar (1566–1572)
Regency of Augustus I, Elector of Saxony (1573–1586)						Children of John Frederick II, ruled jointly until 1596, and then divided their inheritance. After the deaths of both brothers with no heirs, the duchies were divided between its neighbours Saxe-Altenburg and Saxe-Weimar.
John Casimir	12 June 1564; Gotha; First son of John Frederick II and Elisabeth of the Palatinate-Simmern-Sponheim	5 December 1572 – 16 July 1633	Duchy of Coburg and Eisenach (at Coburg)	Anna of Saxony; 16 January 1586; Dresden no children Margaret of Brunswick-Lüneburg; 16 September 1599; Coburg no children	16 July 1633; Coburg aged 69	Children of John Frederick II, ruled jointly until 1596, and then divided their inheritance. After the deaths of both brothers with no heirs, the duchies were divided between its neighbours Saxe-Altenburg and Saxe-Weimar.
John Ernest I	9 July 1566; Gotha; Second son of John Frederick II and Elisabeth of the Palatinate-Simmern-Sponheim	5 December 1572 – 23 October 1638	Duchy of Coburg and Eisenach (at Eisenach)	Elisabeth of Inner Mansfeld; 23 November 1591; Wiener Neustadt one child Christine of Hesse-Kassel; 14 May 1598; Rotenburg an der Fulda no children	23 October 1638; Eisenach aged 72	Children of John Frederick II, ruled jointly until 1596, and then divided their inheritance. After the deaths of both brothers with no heirs, the duchies were divided between its neighbours Saxe-Altenburg and Saxe-Weimar.
Coburg and Eisenach divided between its neighbours Saxe-Altenburg and Saxe-Weimar
Regency of Augustus I, Elector of Saxony (1573–1586)						After his death, his brother took the land and in the next year divided it with his nephews (sons of Frederick William).
Frederick William I	25 April 1562; Weimar; Son of John William and Dorothea Susanne of the Palatinate-Simmern	2 March 1573 – 7 July 1602	Duchy of Weimar	Sophie of Württemberg; 5 May 1583; Weimar six children Anna Maria of the Palatinate-Neuburg; 9 September 1591; Neuburg an der Donau six children	7 July 1602; Weimar aged 40	After his death, his brother took the land and in the next year divided it with his nephews (sons of Frederick William).
Christian I	29 October 1560; Dresden; Son of Augustus I and Anna of Denmark	11 February 1586 – 25 September 1591	Electorate of Saxony	Sophie of Brandenburg; 25 April 1582; Dresden seven children	25 September 1591; Dresden aged 30	
Regency of Sophie of Brandenburg (1591–1601)						
Christian II	23 September 1583; Dresden; First son of Christian I and Sophie of Brandenburg	25 September 1591 – 23 June 1611	Electorate of Saxony	Hedwig of Denmark; 12 September 1602; Dresden no children	23 June 1611; Dresden aged 27	
John II	22 May 1570; Weimar; Second son of John William and Dorothea Susanne of the Palatinate-Simmern	7 July 1602 – 18 July 1605	Duchy of Weimar	Dorothea Maria of Anhalt; 7 January 1593; Altenburg twelve children	18 July 1605; Weimar aged 35	Initially regent for his nephews (while their mother isolated herself in her widow property at Dornburg) John rapidly usurped their place in the duchy, being forced, in 1603, to divide Weimar with them. His nephews had their capital at Altenburg. The widow property reverted later to Weimar.
Anna Maria of the Palatinate-Neuburg	18 August 1575; Neuburg an der Donau; Daughter of Philip Louis, Count Palatine of Neuburg and Anna of Jülich-Cleves-Berg	7 July 1602 – 11 February 1643	Duchy of Weimar (at Dornburg)	Frederick William I 9 September 1591; Neuburg an der Donau six children	11 February 1643; Dornburg aged 67	Initially regent for his nephews (while their mother isolated herself in her widow property at Dornburg) John rapidly usurped their place in the duchy, being forced, in 1603, to divide Weimar with them. His nephews had their capital at Altenburg. The widow property reverted later to Weimar.
Regency of Christian II, Elector of Saxony (1603–1611); Regency of John George I, Elector of Saxony (1611–1618)						Received and ruled jointly the newly created Saxe-Altenburg, after the partition of 1603 with their uncle and regent. None of them had male descendants.
John Philip the Delicious	25 January 1597; Torgau; First son of Frederick William I, Duke of Saxe-Weimar and Anna Maria of the Palatinate-Neuburg	1603 – 1 April 1639	Duchy of Altenburg	Elisabeth of Brunswick-Wolfenbüttel; 25 October 1618; Altenburg one child	1 April 1639; Altenburg aged 42	Received and ruled jointly the newly created Saxe-Altenburg, after the partition of 1603 with their uncle and regent. None of them had male descendants.
Frederick	12 February 1599; Torgau; Second son of Frederick William I, Duke of Saxe-Weimar and Anna Maria of the Palatinate-Neuburg	1603 – 24 October 1625	Duchy of Altenburg	Unmarried	24 October 1625; Seelze aged 26	Received and ruled jointly the newly created Saxe-Altenburg, after the partition of 1603 with their uncle and regent. None of them had male descendants.
John William	13 April 1600; Torgau; Third son of Frederick William I, Duke of Saxe-Weimar and Anna Maria of the Palatinate-Neuburg	1603 – 2 December 1632	Duchy of Altenburg	Unmarried	2 December 1632 outskirts of Brzeg aged 32	Received and ruled jointly the newly created Saxe-Altenburg, after the partition of 1603 with their uncle and regent. None of them had male descendants.
John Ernest I the Younger	21 February 1594; First son of John II and Dorothea Maria of Anhalt	18 July 1605 – 6 December 1626	Duchy of Weimar	Unmarried	6 December 1626 aged 32	Left no children. After his death, his brothers succeeded him jointly, but eventually divided the duchy.
John George I	5 March 1585; Dresden; Second son of Christian I and Sophie of Brandenburg	23 June 1611 – 8 October 1656	Electorate of Saxony	Sibylle Elisabeth of Württemberg; 16 September 1604; Dresden one child Magdalene Sibylle of Prussia; 19 July 1607; Torgau ten children	8 October 1656; Dresden aged 71	Ruled during the Thirty Years' War, during which he was at times allied with the Emperor and at times with the King of Sweden.
William I the Great	11 April 1598; Altenburg; Second son of John II and Dorothea Maria of Anhalt	6 December 1626 – 17 May 1662	Duchy of Weimar	Eleonore Dorothea of Anhalt-Dessau; 23 May 1625; Weimar nine children	17 May 1662; Weimar aged 64	Sons of John II, ruled jointly. In 1640 divided officially the land. William kept Saxe-Weimar. In 1644 William reunited his own domains with his brother Albert's. After William's death his domains were divided by his four sons. On the other hand, Ernest inherited Saxe-Gotha and reunited it with his wife's (as heiress of Saxe-Altenburg).
Albert IV the Unsightful	27 July 1599; Altenburg; Third son of John II and Dorothea Maria of Anhalt	6 December 1626 – 20 December 1644	Duchy of Eisenach (co-ruling in Weimar until 1640)	Dorothea of Saxe-Altenburg; 24 June 1633; Weimar no children	20 December 1644; Eisenach aged 45	Sons of John II, ruled jointly. In 1640 divided officially the land. William kept Saxe-Weimar. In 1644 William reunited his own domains with his brother Albert's. After William's death his domains were divided by his four sons. On the other hand, Ernest inherited Saxe-Gotha and reunited it with his wife's (as heiress of Saxe-Altenburg).
Ernest I the Pious	25 December 1601; Altenburg; Fourth son of John II and Dorothea Maria of Anhalt	6 December 1626 – 26 March 1675	Duchy of Gotha (co-ruling in Weimar until 1640; in Gotha 1640–1672) Duchy of Gotha and Altenburg (from 1672; in Altenburg jure uxoris)	Elisabeth Sophie of Saxe-Altenburg; 24 October 1636; Altenburg eighteen children	26 March 1675; Friedenstein Palace aged 74	Sons of John II, ruled jointly. In 1640 divided officially the land. William kept Saxe-Weimar. In 1644 William reunited his own domains with his brother Albert's. After William's death his domains were divided by his four sons. On the other hand, Ernest inherited Saxe-Gotha and reunited it with his wife's (as heiress of Saxe-Altenburg).
Frederick William II	12 February 1602; Weimar; Fourth son of Frederick William I, Duke of Saxe-Weimar and Anna Maria of the Palatinate-Neuburg	1 April 1639 – 22 April 1669	Duchy of Altenburg	Sophie Elisabeth of Brandenburg; 18 September 1638; Altenburg no children Magdalene Sibylle of Saxony; 11 October 1652; Dresden three children	22 April 1669; Altenburg aged 66	Brother of John Philip, Frederick and John William. Succeeded his childless brothers. Received part of Saxe-Weimar-Eisenach in 1638.
John George II the Worthy	31 May 1613; Dresden; First son of John George I and Magdalena Sibylle of Prussia	8 October 1656 – 22 August 1680	Electorate of Saxony	Magdalene Sibylle of Brandenburg-Bayreuth; 13 November 1638; Dresden three children	22 August 1680; Tübingen aged 67	Children of John George I, divided their inheritance. Christian divided his duchy with his son, Philip, who predeceased him.
Augustus I	13 August 1614; Second son of John George I, Elector of Saxony and Magdalena Sibylle of Prussia	8 October 1656 – 4 June 1680	Duchy of Weissenfels	Anna Maria of Mecklenburg-Schwerin; 23 November 1647; Schwerin twelve children Johanna Walpurgis of Leiningen-Westerburg; 29 January 1672; Halle three children	4 June 1680; Halle aged 65	Children of John George I, divided their inheritance. Christian divided his duchy with his son, Philip, who predeceased him.
Christian I the Elder	27 October 1615; Dresden; Third son of John George I and Magdalena Sibylle of Prussia	8 October 1656 – 18 October 1691	Duchy of Merseburg	Christiana of Sonderburg-Glücksburg; 19 November 1650; Dresden eleven children	18 October 1691; Merseburg aged 75	Children of John George I, divided their inheritance. Christian divided his duchy with his son, Philip, who predeceased him.
Philip	26 October 1657; Merseburg; Third son of Christian I and Christiana of Sonderburg-Glücksburg	1684 – 1 July 1690	Duchy of Merseburg (at Lauchstädt)	Eleonore Sophie of Saxe-Weimar; 9 July 1684; Weimar two children Louise Elisabeth of Württemberg-Oels; 17 August 1688; Bernstadt one child	1 July 1690; Fleurus aged 32	Children of John George I, divided their inheritance. Christian divided his duchy with his son, Philip, who predeceased him.
Maurice I the Righteous	28 March 1619; Dresden; Fourth son of John George I and Magdalena Sibylle of Prussia	8 October 1656 – 4 December 1681	Duchy of Zeitz	Sophie Hedwig of Sonderburg-Glücksburg; 19 November 1650; Dresden two children Dorothea Maria of Saxe-Weimar; 3 July 1656; Weimar ten children Sophie Elisabeth of Sonderburg-Wiesenburg; 14 June 1676; Wiesenburg no children	4 December 1681; Zeitz aged 62	Children of John George I, divided their inheritance. Christian divided his duchy with his son, Philip, who predeceased him.
John Ernest II	11 September 1627; Weimar; First son of William and Eleonore Dorothea of Anhalt-Dessau	17 May 1662 – 15 May 1683	Duchy of Weimar	Christine Elisabeth of Sonderburg; 14 August 1656; Weimar five children	15 May 1683; Weimar aged 55	Children of William I, divided their inheritance.
Adolf William the Noble	15 May 1632; Weimar; Second son of William and Eleonore Dorothea of Anhalt-Dessau	17 May 1662 – 21 November 1668	Duchy of Eisenach	Marie Elisabeth of Brunswick-Wolfenbüttel; 18 January 1663; Wolfenbüttel five children	21 November 1668; Eisenach aged 36	Children of William I, divided their inheritance.
Bernard II the Follower	14 October 1638; Weimar; Fourth son of William and Eleonore Dorothea of Anhalt-Dessau	17 May 1662 – 3 May 1678	Duchy of Jena	Marie Charlotte de la Trémoille; 10 June 1662; Paris five children	3 May 1678; Jena aged 39	Children of William I, divided their inheritance.
Regency of John George I, Duke of Marksuhl (1668–1671)						Died as a minor. His uncle, as regent, inherited his domain.
William Augustus	30 November 1668; Eisenach; Son of Adolph William and Marie Elisabeth of Brunswick-Wolfenbüttel	21 November 1668 – 23 February 1671	Duchy of Eisenach	Unmarried	23 February 1671; Eisenach aged 2	Died as a minor. His uncle, as regent, inherited his domain.
John George I the Striver	12 July 1634; Weimar; Third son of William and Eleonore Dorothea of Anhalt-Dessau	23 February 1671 – 19 September 1686	Duchy of Eisenach (at Marksuhl since 1662)	Johannetta of Sayn-Wittgenstein; 29 May 1661; Wallau nine children	19 September 1686; Marksuhl aged 52	Son of William I, received Marksuhl in the division of 1662. He also served as regent for his nephew William August of Eisenach, but after his nephew's death in 1671, he inherited it himself, merging Marksuhl in Eisenach. From 1683 he also became regent for his other nephew at Jena.
Regency of John George II, Elector of Saxony (1669–1672)						Died as a minor. His lands were inherited by his cousin, Elisabeth Sophie.
Frederick William III	12 July 1657; Altenburg; Son of Frederick William II and Magdalene Sibylle of Saxony	22 April 1669 – 14 April 1672	Duchy of Altenburg	Unmarried	14 April 1672; Altenburg aged 14	Died as a minor. His lands were inherited by his cousin, Elisabeth Sophie.
Elisabeth Sophie	10 October 1619; Halle; Daughter of John Philip and Elisabeth of Brunswick-Wolfenbüttel	14 April 1672 – 20 December 1680	Duchy of Altenburg	Ernest I, Duke of Gotha; 24 October 1636; Altenburg eighteen children	20 December 1680; Gotha aged 61	She was declared the general heiress of the family in case of the extinction of the male line, which eventually happened in her lifetime.
Saxe-Altenburg merged in Saxe-Gotha to form Saxe-Gotha-Altenburg
Frederick I	15 July 1646; Gotha; First son of Ernest I and Elisabeth Sophie of Saxe-Altenburg	26 March 1675 – 2 August 1691	Duchy of Gotha and Altenburg (in Gotha and Altenburg proper, jointly with his mother in Altenburg until 1680)	Magdalena Sibylle of Saxe-Weissenfels; 14 November 1669; Halle eight children Christine of Baden-Durlach; 14 August 1681; Ansbach no children	2 August 1691; Friedrichswerth aged 45	Children of Ernest I, divided their inheritance.
Albert V	24 May 1648; Gotha; Second son of Ernest I and Elisabeth Sophie of Saxe-Altenburg	26 March 1675 – 6 August 1699	Duchy of Gotha and Altenburg (at Coburg)	Marie Elisabeth of Brunswick-Wolfenbüttel; 18 July 1676; Gotha one child Susanne Elisabeth Kempinsky; 24 May 1688; Coburg (morganatic) no children	6 August 1699; Coburg aged 51	Children of Ernest I, divided their inheritance.
Bernard I	10 September 1649; Gotha; Third son of Ernest I and Elisabeth Sophie of Saxe-Altenburg	26 March 1675 – 27 April 1706	Duchy of Meiningen	Marie Hedwig of Hesse-Darmstadt; 20 November 1671; Gotha seven children Elisabeth Eleonore of Brunswick-Wolfenbüttel; 25 January 1681; Schöningen five children	27 April 1706; Meiningen aged 56	Children of Ernest I, divided their inheritance.
Henry	19 November 1650; Gotha; Fourth son of Ernest I and Elisabeth Sophie of Saxe-Altenburg	26 March 1675 – 13 May 1710	Duchy of Gotha and Altenburg (at Römhild)	Marie Elisabeth of Hesse-Darmstadt; 1 March 1676; Darmstadt no children	13 May 1710; Römhild aged 59	Children of Ernest I, divided their inheritance.
Christian	6 January 1653; Gotha; Fifth son of Ernest I and Elisabeth Sophie of Saxe-Altenburg	26 March 1675 – 28 April 1707	Duchy of Gotha and Altenburg (at Eisenberg)	Christiane of Saxe-Merseburg; 13 February 1677; Merseburg one child Sophie Marie of Hesse-Darmstadt; 9 February 1681; Darmstadt no children	28 April 1707; Eisenberg aged 54	Children of Ernest I, divided their inheritance.
Ernest I	12 June 1655; Gotha; Sixth son of Ernest I and Elisabeth Sophie of Saxe-Altenburg	26 March 1675 – 17 October 1715	Duchy of Hildburghausen	Sophie of Waldeck; 30 November 1680; Arolsen eighteen children	17 October 1715; Hildburghausen aged 60	Children of Ernest I, divided their inheritance.
John Ernest	22 August 1658; Gotha; Seventh son of Ernest I and Elisabeth Sophie of Saxe-Altenburg	26 March 1675 – 17 February 1729	Duchy of Saalfeld (until 1699) Duchy of Coburg and Saalfeld (since 1699)	Sophie Hedwig of Saxe-Merseburg; 18 February 1680; Merseburg five children Charlotte Johanna of Waldeck-Wildungen; 2 December 1690; Maastricht eight children	17 February 1729; Saalfeld aged 70	Children of Ernest I, divided their inheritance.
Coburg merged in Saxe-Saalfeld to form Saxe-Coburg-Saalfeld; Saxe-Römhild was annexed to Saxe-Coburg-Saalfeld; Saxe-Eisenberg was annexed by Saxe-Hildburghausen
Regency of John Ernest II, Duke of Saxe-Weimar (1678–1683); Regency of John George I, Duke of Saxe-Eisenach (1683–1686); Regency of William Ernest, Duke of Saxe-Weimar (1686–1690)						Died as a minor.
John William	28 March 1675; Jena; Son of Bernard II and Marie Charlotte de la Trémoille	3 May 1678 – 4 November 1690	Duchy of Jena	Unmarried	4 November 1690; Jena aged 15	Died as a minor.
Saxe-Jena divided between its neighbours Saxe-Eisenach and Saxe-Weimar
John Adolph I the Careful	2 November 1649; Halle; First son of Augustus and Anna Maria of Mecklenburg-Schwerin	4 June 1680 – 24 May 1697	Duchy of Weissenfels (at Querfurt)	Johanna Magdalena of Saxe-Altenburg; 25 October 1671; Altenburg eleven children Christiane Wilhelmine of Bünau; 3 February 1692; Querfurt (morganatic) eleven children	24 May 1697; Weissenfels aged 47	Children of Augustus, divided their inheritance.
Henry the Shooter-Up	29 September 1657; Halle; Second son of Augustus and Anna Maria of Mecklenburg-Schwerin	4 June 1680 – 16 February 1728	County of Barby	Elisabeth Albertine of Anhalt-Dessau; 30 March 1686; Dessau seven children	16 February 1728; Barby aged 70	Children of Augustus, divided their inheritance.
John George III	20 June 1647; Dresden; Son of John George II and Magdalene Sibylle of Brandenburg-Bayreuth	22 August 1680 – 12 September 1691	Electorate of Saxony	Anna Sophie of Denmark; 9 October 1666; Copenhagen two children	12 September 1691; Tübingen aged 44	
Maurice William	12 March 1664; Moritzburg Palace; First son of Maurice and Dorothea Maria of Saxe-Weimar	4 December 1681 – 15 November 1718	Duchy of Zeitz	Marie Amalie of Brandenburg; 25 June 1689; Potsdam five children	15 November 1718; Osterburg Castle aged 54	Children of Maurice, divided their inheritance. After their deaths Zeitz and Peggau merged in the Electorate.
Frederick Henry	21 July 1668; Moritzburg Palace; Second son of Maurice and Dorothea Maria of Saxe-Weimar	4 December 1681 – 18 December 1713	Duchy of Zeitz (at Pegau and Neustadt)	Sophie Angelika of Württemberg-Oels; 23 April 1699; Oleśnica no children Anna Frederica of Sonderburg-Wiesenburg; 27 February 1702; Moritzburg two children	18 December 1713; Neustadt aged 45	Children of Maurice, divided their inheritance. After their deaths Zeitz and Peggau merged in the Electorate.
Saxe-Zeitz-Pegau-Neustadt merged in Saxe-Zeitz; Saxe-Zeitz merged in the Electorate of Saxony
William Ernest I	19 October 1662; Weimar; First son of John Ernest II and Christine Elisabeth of Sonderburg	15 May 1683 – 26 August 1728	Duchy of Weimar	Charlotte Marie of Saxe-Jena; 2 November 1683; Eisenach no children	26 August 1728; Weimar aged 65	Children of John Ernest II, ruled jointly.
John Ernest III	22 June 1664; Weimar; Second son of John Ernest II and Christine Elisabeth of Sonderburg	15 May 1683 – 10 May 1707	Duchy of Weimar	Sophie Auguste of Anhalt-Zerbst; 11 October 1685; Zerbst five children Charlotte of Hesse-Homburg; 4 November 1694; Kassel four children	10 May 1707; Weimar aged 42	Children of John Ernest II, ruled jointly.
John George II	24 July 1665; Friedewald; First son of John George I and Johannetta of Sayn-Wittgenstein	19 September 1686 – 10 November 1698	Duchy of Eisenach	Sophie Charlotte of Württemberg; 20 September 1688; Kirchheim unter Teck no children	10 November 1698; Eisenach aged 33	Left no descendants. He was succeeded by his brother.
Regency of Bernard I, Duke of Meiningen and Henry, Duke of Römhild (1691–1693)						
Frederick II	28 July 1676; Gotha; Son of Frederick I and Magdalena Sibylle of Saxe-Weissenfels	2 August 1691 – 23 March 1732	Duchy of Gotha and Altenburg	Magdalena Augusta of Anhalt-Zerbst; 7 June 1696; Gotha nineteen children	23 March 1732; Altenburg aged 55	
John George IV	18 October 1668; Dresden; First son of John George III and Anna Sophie of Denmark	12 September 1691 – 27 April 1694	Electorate of Saxony	Eleonore Erdmuthe of Saxe-Eisenach; 17 April 1692; Leipzig no children	27 April 1694; Dresden aged 25	
Christian II	19 November 1653; Merseburg; First son of Christian I and Christiana of Sonderburg-Glücksburg	18 October 1691 – 20 October 1694	Duchy of Merseburg	Erdmuthe Dorothea of Saxe-Zeitz; 14 October 1679; Moritzburg seven children	20 October 1694; Merseburg aged 40	Children of Christian I, divided their inheritance. Zörbig eventually re-merged in Merseburg.
Augustus	15 February 1655; Merseburg; Second son of Christian I and Christiana of Sonderburg-Glücksburg	18 October 1691 – 27 March 1715	Duchy of Merseburg (at Zörbig)	Hedwig of Mecklenburg-Güstrow; 1 December 1686; Güstrow eight children	27 March 1715; Zörbig aged 60	Children of Christian I, divided their inheritance. Zörbig eventually re-merged in Merseburg.
Frederick Augustus I the Strong	12 May 1670; Dresden; Second son of John George III and Anna Sophie of Denmark	27 April 1694 – 1 February 1733	Electorate of Saxony	Christiane Eberhardine of Brandenburg-Bayreuth; 20 January 1693; Bayreuth one child	1 February 1733; Warsaw aged 62	Converted to Catholicism in 1697 in order to compete for the crown of Poland. Took the Polish crown in 1697, opposed by Stanisław Leszczyński since 1704.
Regency of Erdmuthe Dorothea of Saxe-Zeitz and Frederick Augustus I, Elector of Saxony (1694)						Left no descendants. He was succeeded by his also minor brother.
Christian III Maurice	7 November 1680; Merseburg; First son of Christian II and Erdmuthe Dorothea of Saxe-Zeitz	20 October – 14 November 1694	Duchy of Merseburg	Unmarried	14 November 1694; Merseburg aged 14	Left no descendants. He was succeeded by his also minor brother.
Regency of Erdmuthe Dorothea of Saxe-Zeitz and Frederick Augustus I, Elector of Saxony (1694–1712)						Left no descendants. He was succeeded by his uncle, Henry.
Maurice William	5 February 1688; Merseburg; Second son of Christian II and Erdmuthe Dorothea of Saxe-Zeitz	14 November 1694 – 21 April 1731	Duchy of Merseburg	Henriette Charlotte of Nassau-Idstein; 4 November 1711; Istein one child	21 April 1731; Merseburg aged	Left no descendants. He was succeeded by his uncle, Henry.
Henry	2 September 1661; Merseburg; Fourth son of Christian I and Christiana of Sonderburg-Glücksburg	21 April 1731 – 28 July 1738	Duchy of Merseburg (at Spremberg since 1691)	Elisabeth of Mecklenburg-Güstrow; 29 March 1692; Güstrow three children	28 July 1738; Doberlug-Kirchhain aged 76	Received, after his father's death, the town of Spremberg. In 1731 succeeded in Merseburg, reuniting its original lands with those he unexpectedly inherited. Left no descendants and Merseburg merged in the Electorate of Saxony.
Saxe-Merseburg-Spremberg merged in Saxe-Merseburg; Saxe-Merseburg merged in the Electorate of Saxony
John George	13 July 1677; Halle; First son of John Adolph I and Johanna Magdalena of Saxe-Altenburg	24 May 1697 – 16 March 1712	Duchy of Weissenfels (at Querfurt)	Fredericka Elisabeth of Saxe-Eisenach; 7 January 1698; Jena seven children	16 March 1712; Weissenfels aged 34	In 1711, John George gave his uncle Frederick the town of Dahme, which after his death was re-absorbed by Weissenfels. John George died without male descendants, and was succeeded by his brother Christian.
Frederick	20 November 1673; Halle; Third son of Augustus and Johanna Walpurgis of Leiningen-Westerburg	1711 – 16 April 1715	Duchy of Weissenfels (at Dahme)	Emilie Agnes Reuss of Schleiz; 13 February 1711; Dahme no children	16 April 1715; Dahme aged 41	In 1711, John George gave his uncle Frederick the town of Dahme, which after his death was re-absorbed by Weissenfels. John George died without male descendants, and was succeeded by his brother Christian.
John William III	17 October 1666; Friedewald; Second son of John George I and Johannetta of Sayn-Wittgenstein	10 November 1698 – 14 January 1729	Duchy of Eisenach	Amalie of Nassau-Dietz; 28 November 1690; Oranjewoud two children Christine Juliane of Baden-Durlach; 27 February 1697; Wolfenbüttel seven children Magdalene Sibylle of Saxe-Weissenfels; 28 July 1708; Weissenfels three children Marie Christine Felizitas of Leiningen-Dagsburg-Falkenburg-Heidesheim; 29 May 1727; Hanau no children	14 January 1729; Eisenach aged 62	
Ernest Louis I	7 October 1672; Gotha; First son of Bernard I and Marie Hedwig of Hesse-Darmstadt	27 April 1706 – 24 November 1724	Duchy of Meiningen	Dorothea Marie of Saxe-Gotha-Altenburg; 19 September 1704; Gotha five children Elisabeth Sophie of Brandenburg; 3 June 1714; Coburg no children	24 November 1724; Meiningen aged 52	
Christian	23 February 1682; Weissenfels; Second son of John Adolph I and Johanna Magdalena of Saxe-Altenburg	16 March 1712 – 28 June 1736	Duchy of Weissenfels (at Querfurt)	Louise Christine of Stolberg-Stolberg-Ortenberg; 12 May 1712; Stolberg no children	28 June 1736; Sangerhausen aged 54	Left no male descendants. He was succeeded by his brother John Adolf.
Ernest Frederick I	21 August 1681; Gotha; Son of Ernest and Sophie Henriette of Waldeck	17 October 1715 – 9 March 1724	Duchy of Hildburghausen	Sophia Albertine of Erbach-Erbach; 4 February 1704; Erbach im Odenwald fourteen children	9 March 1724; Hildburghausen aged 42	
Regency of Sophia Albertine of Erbach-Erbach (1724–1728)						
Ernest Frederick II	17 December 1707; Hildburghausen; Son of Ernest Frederick I and Sophia Albertine of Erbach-Erbach	9 March 1724 – 13 August 1745	Duchy of Hildburghausen	Caroline of Erbach-Fürstenau; 19 June 1726; Fürstenau four children	13 August 1745; Hildburghausen aged 37	
Regency of Frederick William of Saxe-Meiningen (1724–1733), Frederick II, Duke of Gotha and Altenburg (1724–1732) and Anton Ulrich of Saxe-Meiningen (1732–1733)						Children of Ernest Louis I, ruled jointly. Both left no descendants, and were succeeded by their uncles and previous regents.
Ernest Louis II	8 August 1709; Coburg; First son of Ernest Louis I and Dorothea Marie of Saxe-Gotha-Altenburg	24 November 1724 – 24 February 1729	Duchy of Meiningen	Unmarried	24 February 1729; Meiningen aged 28	Children of Ernest Louis I, ruled jointly. Both left no descendants, and were succeeded by their uncles and previous regents.
Charles Frederick	18 July 1712; Meiningen; Second son of Ernest Louis I and Dorothea Marie of Saxe-Gotha-Altenburg	24 November 1724 – 28 March 1743	Duchy of Meiningen	Unmarried	28 March 1743; Meiningen aged 30	Children of Ernest Louis I, ruled jointly. Both left no descendants, and were succeeded by their uncles and previous regents.
George Albert	19 April 1695; Dessau; Son of Henry and Elisabeth Albertine of Anhalt-Dessau	16 February 1728 – 12 June 1739	County of Barby	Auguste Louise of Württemberg-Oels; 18 February 1721; Forst no children	12 June 1739; Barby aged 44	Left no descendants, and his land merged in Saxe-Weissenfels.
Barby re-merged in Saxe-Weissenfels
Ernest Augustus I	19 April 1688; Weimar; Son of John Ernest III and Sophie Auguste of Anhalt-Zerbst	26 August 1728 – 19 January 1748	Duchy of Weimar (until 1741) Duchy of Weimar and Eisenach (from 1741)	Eleonore Wilhelmine of Anhalt-Köthen; 2 November 1683; Nienburg eight children Sophie Charlotte of Brandenburg-Bayreuth; 7 April 1734; Bayreuth four children	19 January 1748; Eisenach aged 59	Co-ruled with William Ernest since 1707. Reunited under his rule the duchies of Weimar and Eisenach.
William Henry	10 November 1691; Oranjewoud; Son of John William III and Amalia of Nassau-Dietz	14 January 1729 – 26 July 1741	Duchy of Eisenach	Albertine Juliane of Nassau-Idstein; 15 February 1713; Idstein no children Anna Sophie Charlotte of Brandenburg-Schwedt; 3 June 1723; Berlin no children	26 July 1741; Eisenach aged 49	Left no descendants: Saxe-Eisenach merged with Saxe-Weimar.
Saxe-Eisenach merged in Saxe-Weimar to form Saxe-Weimar-Eisenach
Christian Ernest	18 August 1683; Saalfeld; Son of John Ernest and Sophie Hedwig of Saxe-Merseburg	17 February 1729 – 4 September 1745	Duchy of Coburg and Saalfeld	Christiane Fredericka of Koss; 18 August 1724; Naitschau (morganatic) no children	4 September 1745; Saalfeld aged 62	Left no descendants. He was succeeded by his brother.
Frederick III	14 April 1699; Gotha; Son of Frederick II and Magdalene Augusta of Anhalt-Zerbst	23 March 1732 – 10 March 1772	Duchy of Gotha and Altenburg	Luise Dorothea of Saxe-Meiningen; 17 September 1729; Gotha eight children	10 March 1772; Gotha aged 72	
Frederick Augustus II the Fat	17 October 1696; Dresden; Son of Frederick Augustus I and Christiane Eberhardine of Brandenburg-Bayreuth	1 February 1733 – 5 October 1763	Electorate of Saxony	Maria Josepha of Austria; 20 August 1719; Dresden sixteen children	5 October 1763; Dresden aged 66	Converted to Catholicism in 1712. King of Poland 1734–1763.
John Adolph II	4 September 1685; Weissenfels; Son of Christian and Louise Christine of Stolberg-Stolberg-Ortenberg	28 June 1736 – 16 May 1746	Duchy of Weissenfels (at Querfurt)	Johannette Antoinette Juliane of Saxe-Eisenach; 9 May 1721; Eisenach one child Frederica of Saxe-Gotha and Altenburg; 27 November 1734; Altenburg five children	16 May 1746; Leipzig aged 60	Left no male descendants. After his death the Duchy was reannexed by the Electorate of Saxony.
Saxe-Weissenfels-Querfurt (with exceptions) merged in the Electorate of Saxony
Frederick William	16 February 1679; Ichtershausen; Second son of Bernard I and Marie Hedwig of Hesse-Darmstadt	28 March 1743 – 10 March 1746	Duchy of Meiningen	Unmarried	10 March 1746; Meiningen aged 67	Brothers of Ernest Louis I, succeeded their nephews after their deaths with no descendants.
Anton Ulrich	22 October 1687; Meiningen; Son of Bernard I and Elisabeth Eleonore of Brunswick-Wolfenbüttel	28 March 1743 – 27 January 1763	Duchy of Meiningen	Philippine Elisabeth Caesar; January 1711 (morganatic) ten children Charlotte Amalie of Hesse-Philippsthal; 26 September 1750; Bad Homburg vor der Höhe eight children	27 January 1763; Frankfurt aged 75	Brothers of Ernest Louis I, succeeded their nephews after their deaths with no descendants.
Regency of Caroline of Erbach-Fürstenau (1745–1748)						
Ernest Frederick III	10 June 1727; Königsberg; Son of Ernest Frederick II and Caroline of Erbach-Fürstenau	13 August 1745 – 23 September 1780	Duchy of Hildburghausen	Louise of Denmark; 1 October 1749; Copenhagen one child Christiane Sophie Charlotte of Brandenburg-Bayreuth; 20 January 1757; Copenhagen one child Ernestine of Saxe-Weimar; 1 July 1758; Bayreuth three children	23 September 1780; Straufhain aged 53	
Francis Josias	25 September 1697; Saalfeld; Son of John Ernest and Charlotte Johanna of Waldeck-Wildungen	4 September 1745 – 16 September 1764	Duchy of Coburg and Saalfeld	Anna Sophie of Schwarzburg-Rudolstadt; 2 January 1723; Rudolstadt eight children	16 September 1764; Bad Rodach aged 66	
Frederica of Saxe-Gotha and Altenburg	17 July 1715; Weissenfels; Daughter of Frederick II, Duke of Gotha and Altenburg and Magdalena Augusta of Anhalt-Zerbst	16 May 1746 – 2 May 1775	Duchy of Weissenfels (at Langensalza)	John Adolph II; 27 November 1734; Altenburg five children	2 May 1775; Langensalza aged 59	Inherited from her husband a seat in Langensalza, where she ruled until her death.
Langensalza annexed to the Electorate of Saxony
Regency of Francis Josias, Duke of Coburg and Saalfeld (1748–1755)						
Ernest Augustus II	2 June 1737; Weimar; Son of Ernest Augustus I and Sophie Charlotte of Brandenburg-Bayreuth	19 January 1748 – 28 May 1758	Duchy of Weimar and Eisenach	Anna Amalia of Brunswick-Wolfenbüttel; 16 March 1756; Brunswick two children	28 May 1758; Weimar aged 20	
Regency of Anna Amalia of Brunswick-Wolfenbüttel (1758–1775)						In 1815, his Duchy was elevated to a Grand Duchy.
Charles Augustus	3 September 1757; Weimar; Son of Ernest Augustus II and Anna Amalia of Brunswick-Wolfenbüttel	28 May 1758 – 14 June 1828	Duchy of Weimar and Eisenach (until 1815) Grand Duchy of Weimar and Eisenach (from 1815)	Louise of Hesse-Darmstadt; 3 October 1775; Karlsruhe seven children	14 June 1828; Graditz aged 70	In 1815, his Duchy was elevated to a Grand Duchy.
Regency of Charlotte Amalie of Hesse-Philippsthal (1763–1779)						Left no descendants. He was succeeded by his brother.
Charles William	19 November 1754; Frankfurt; First son of Anton Ulrich and Charlotte Amalie of Hesse-Philippsthal	27 January 1763 – 21 January 1782	Duchy of Meiningen	Louise of Stolberg-Gedern; 5 June 1780; Gedern no children	21 January 1782; Sonneberg aged 27	Left no descendants. He was succeeded by his brother.
Frederick Christian	5 September 1722; Dresden Castle; Son of Frederick Augustus II and Maria Josepha of Austria	5 October – 17 December 1763	Electorate of Saxony	Maria Antonia of Bavaria; 13 June 1747; Munich (by proxy); 20 June 1747; Dresden (in person) nine children	17 December 1763; Dresden Castle aged 41	Raised Catholic. After 74 days of reign, died of smallpox.
Regency of Maria Antonia of Bavaria and Prince Francis Xavier of Saxony (1763–1768)						His Electorate ceased with the fall of the Holy Roman Empire in 1806, and he became king of the newly independent Kingdom of Saxony. Also Duke of Warsaw 1807–1813. Left no male descendants. He was succeeded by his brother.
Frederick Augustus III & I the Just	23 December 1750; Dresden; First son of Frederick Christian and Maria Antonia of Bavaria	17 December 1763 – 20 December 1806 20 December 1806 – 5 May 1827	Electorate of Saxony (until 1806) Kingdom of Saxony (from 1806)	Amalie of Zweibrücken-Birkenfeld; 17 January 1769; Mannheim (by proxy); 29 January 1769; Dresden (in person) four children	5 May 1827; Dresden aged 76	His Electorate ceased with the fall of the Holy Roman Empire in 1806, and he became king of the newly independent Kingdom of Saxony. Also Duke of Warsaw 1807–1813. Left no male descendants. He was succeeded by his brother.
Ernest Frederick	8 March 1724; Saalfeld; Son of Francis Josias and Anna Sophie of Schwarzburg-Rudolstadt	16 September 1764 – 8 September 1800	Duchy of Coburg and Saalfeld	Sophie Antonia of Brunswick-Wolfenbüttel; 23 April 1749; Wolfenbüttel seven children	8 September 1800; Coburg aged 76	
Ernest II	30 January 1745; Gotha; Son of Frederick III and Luise Dorothea of Saxe-Meiningen	10 March 1772 – 20 April 1804	Duchy of Gotha and Altenburg	Charlotte of Saxe-Meiningen; 21 March 1769; Meiningen four children	20 April 1804; Gotha aged 59	
Regency of Prince Joseph of Saxe-Hildburghausen (1780–1787)						Inherited Altenburg from Frederick IV, and renamed his duchy as Saxe-Altenburg.
Frederick	29 April 1763; Hildburghausen; Son of Ernest Frederick III and Ernestine of Saxe-Weimar	23 September 1780 – 29 September 1834	Duchy of Hildburghausen (until 1826) Duchy of Altenburg (from 1826)	Charlotte Georgine of Mecklenburg-Strelitz; 3 September 1785; Hildburghausen twelve children	29 September 1834; Altenburg aged 71	Inherited Altenburg from Frederick IV, and renamed his duchy as Saxe-Altenburg.
George I	4 February 1761; Meiningen; Second son of Anton Ulrich and Charlotte Amalie of Hesse-Philippsthal	21 January 1782 – 24 December 1803	Duchy of Meiningen	Louise Eleonore of Hohenlohe-Langenburg; 27 November 1782; Langenburg four children	24 December 1803; Meiningen aged 42	
Francis	15 July 1750; Coburg; Son of Ernest Frederick and Sophie Antonia of Brunswick-Wolfenbüttel	8 September 1800 – 9 December 1806	Duchy of Coburg and Saalfeld	Sophie of Saxe-Hildburghausen; 6 March 1776; Hildburghausen no children Augusta Reuss of Ebersdorf; 13 June 1777; Ebersdorf ten children	9 December 1806; Coburg aged 56	
Regency of Louise Eleonore of Hohenlohe-Langenburg (1803–1821)						
Bernard II	17 December 1800; Son of George I and Louise Eleonore of Hohenlohe-Langenburg	24 September 1803 – 20 September 1866	Duchy of Meiningen	Marie Frederica of Hesse-Kassel; 23 March 1825; Kassel two children	3 December 1882 aged 81	
Augustus	23 November 1772; Gotha; First son of Ernest II and Charlotte of Saxe-Meiningen	20 April 1804 – 17 May 1822	Duchy of Gotha and Altenburg	Louise Charlotte of Mecklenburg-Schwerin; 21 October 1797; Ludwigslust one child Karoline Amalie of Hesse-Kassel; 24 April 1802; Kassel no children	17 May 1822; Gotha aged 49	Left no male descendants. The land was inherited by his brother Frederick IV.
Ernest I	2 January 1784; Coburg; Son of Francis and Augusta Reuss of Ebersdorf	9 December 1806 – 29 January 1844	Duchy of Coburg and Saalfeld (until 1826) Duchy of Coburg and Gotha (from 1826)	Louise of Saxe-Gotha-Altenburg; 3 July 1817; Gotha two children Marie of Württemberg; 23 December 1832; Coburg no children	29 January 1844; Gotha aged 60	Inherited Gotha from Frederick IV, but had to cede Saalfeld to Meiningen. The duchy changed its name to Saxe-Coburg and Gotha
Frederick IV	28 November 1774; Gotha; Second son of Ernest II and Charlotte of Saxe-Meiningen	17 May 1822 – 11 February 1825	Duchy of Gotha and Altenburg	Unmarried	11 February 1825; Gotha aged 50	Left no male descendants. The territory was divided between Saxe-Coburg-Saalfeld and Saxe-Hildburghausen.
Saxe-Gotha-Altenburg divided between its neighbours Saxe-Coburg-Saalfeld and Saxe-Hildburghausen
Anthony the Kind	27 December 1755; Dresden; Second son of Frederick Christian and Maria Antonia of Bavaria	5 May 1827 – 6 June 1836	Kingdom of Saxony	Maria Carolina of Savoy; 29 September 1781; Stupinigi (by proxy); 24 October 1781; Dresden (in person) no children Maria Theresa of Austria; 8 September 1787; Florence (by proxy); 18 October 1787; Dresden (in person) four children	6 June 1836; Dresden aged 80	Left no male descendants. He was succeeded by his nephew.
Charles Frederick	2 February 1783; Weimar; Son of Charles Augustus and Louise of Hesse-Darmstadt	14 June 1828 – 8 July 1853	Grand Duchy of Weimar and Eisenach	Maria Pavlovna of Russia; 3 August 1804; St. Petersburg four children	8 July 1853; Schloss Belvedere aged 70	
Joseph	27 August 1789; Hildburghausen; First son of Frederick and Charlotte Georgine of Mecklenburg-Strelitz	29 September 1834 – 30 November 1848	Duchy of Altenburg	Amelia of Württemberg; 24 April 1817; Kirchheim unter Teck six children	25 November 1868; Altenburg aged 79	He implemented several buildings in Altenburg, but his government was considered conservative and resistant to reform; for this, he was forced to abdicate during the civil revolution of 1848. Left no male descendants. He was succeeded by his brother George.
Frederick Augustus II	18 May 1797; Pillnitz; First son of Prince Maximilian of Saxony and Princess Caroline of Parma	6 June 1836 – 9 August 1854	Kingdom of Saxony	Maria Carolina of Austria; 26 September 1819; Vienna (by proxy); 7 October 1819; Dresden (by person) no children Maria Anna of Bavaria; 24 April 1833; Dresden no children	9 August 1854; Karrösten aged 57	Left no descendants. He was succeeded by his brother.
Ernest II	21 June 1818; Ehrenburg Palace; Son of Ernest I and Louise of Saxe-Gotha and Altenburg	29 January 1844 – 22 August 1893	Duchy of Coburg and Gotha	Alexandrine of Baden; 3 May 1842; Karlsruhe no children	22 August 1893; Reinhardsbrunn aged 75	Left no descendants. He was succeeded by his nephews.
George	24 July 1796; Hildburghausen; Second son of Frederick and Charlotte Georgine of Mecklenburg-Strelitz	30 November 1848 – 3 August 1853	Duchy of Altenburg	Marie Louise of Mecklenburg-Schwerin; 7 October 1825; Ludwigslust three children	3 August 1853; Hummelshain aged 57	
Charles Alexander	24 June 1818; Weimar; Son of Charles Frederick and Maria Pavlovna of Russia	8 July 1853 – 5 January 1901	Grand Duchy of Weimar and Eisenach	Sophie of the Netherlands; 8 October 1842; The Hague four children	5 January 1901; Weimar aged 82	
Ernest I	16 February 1826; Hildburghausen; Son of George and Marie Louise of Mecklenburg-Schwerin	3 August 1853 – 7 February 1908	Duchy of Altenburg	Agnes of Anhalt-Dessau; 28 April 1853; Ludwigslust two children	7 February 1908; Altenburg aged 81	Left no male descendants. He was succeeded by his nephew.
John	12 December 1801; Dresden; Second son of Prince Maximilian of Saxony and Princess Caroline of Parma	9 August 1854 – 29 October 1873	Kingdom of Saxony	Amalie Auguste of Bavaria; 10 November 1822; Munich (by proxy); 21 November 1822; Dresden (in person) nine children	29 October 1873; Pillnitz aged 71	Became a subordinate ruler in the German Empire after the Unification of Germany in 1871.
George II	2 April 1826; Son of Bernard II and Marie Fredericka of Hesse-Kassel	20 September 1866 – 25 June 1914	Duchy of Meiningen	Charlotte of Prussia; 18 May 1850; Berlin four children Feodora of Hohenlohe-Langenburg; 23 October 1858; Langenburg three children Ellen Franz; 18 March 1873; Liebenstein (morganatic) no children	25 June 1914; Bad Wildungen aged 88	
Albert the Good	23 April 1828; Dresden; First son of John and Amalie Auguste of Bavaria	29 October 1873 – 19 June 1902	Kingdom of Saxony	Carola of Sweden; 18 June 1853; Dresden no children	19 June 1902; Szczodre aged 74	
Alfred	6 August 1844; Windsor Castle; Son of Prince Albert of Saxe-Coburg and Gotha and Victoria, Queen of the United Kingdom	22 August 1893 – 30 July 1900	Duchy of Coburg and Gotha	Maria Alexandrovna of Russia; 23 January 1874; St Petersburg six children	30 July 1900; Schloss Rosenau, Coburg aged 55	Nephew of Ernest II.
Regency of Prince Ernst of Hohenlohe-Langenburg (1900–1905)						Nephew of Alfred. Monarchy abolished in 1918.
Charles Edward	19 July 1884; Claremont; Son of Prince Leopold of the United Kingdom and Princess Helena of Waldeck and Pyrmont	30 July 1900 – 13 November 1918	Duchy of Coburg and Gotha	Victoria Adelaide of Schleswig-Holstein; 11 October 1905; Schleswig five children	6 March 1954; Coburg aged 69>	Nephew of Alfred. Monarchy abolished in 1918.
William Ernest	10 June 1876; Weimar; Son of Prince Charles Augustus of Saxe-Weimar and Eisenach and Princess Pauline of Saxe-Weimar and Eisenach	5 January 1901 – 13 November 1918	Grand Duchy of Weimar and Eisenach	Caroline Reuss of Greiz; 30 April 1903; Bückeburg no children Feodora of Saxe-Meiningen; 14 January 1910; Meiningen four children	24 April 1923; Henryków aged 46	Grandson of Charles Alexander, as son of Charles Augustus, Hereditary Grand Duke of Saxe-Weimar-Eisenach. Monarchy abolished in 1918.
George	8 August 1832; Dresden; Second son of John and Amalie Auguste of Bavaria	19 June 1902 – 15 October 1904	Kingdom of Saxony	Maria Anna of Portugal; 11 May 1859; Lisbon eight children	15 October 1904; Pillnitz aged 72	
Frederick Augustus III	25 May 1865; Dresden; Son of George and Maria Anna of Portugal	15 October 1904 – 13 November 1918	Kingdom of Saxony	Louise of Austria; 21 November 1891; Vienna (annulled by royal decree in 1903, after her escape from court) seven children	18 February 1932; Szczodre aged 66	The last King of Saxony. Abdicated voluntarily in the German Revolution of 1918–1919.
Ernest II	31 August 1871; Altenburg; Son of Prince Maurice of Saxe-Altenburg and Princess Augusta of Saxe-Meiningen	7 February 1908 – 13 November 1918	Duchy of Altenburg	Adelaide of Schaumburg-Lippe; 17 February 1898; Bückeburg (annulled 1920) four children Maria Triebel; 15 July 1934; Trockenborn-Wolfersdorf (morganatic) no children	22 March 1955; Trockenborn-Wolfersdorf aged 83	Grandson of George and nephew of Ernest I. Monarchy abolished in 1918.
Bernard III	1 April 1851; Meiningen; Son of George II and Charlotte of Prussia	25 June 1914 – 13 November 1918	Duchy of Meiningen	Charlotte of Prussia; 18 February 1878; Berlin two children	16 January 1928; Meiningen aged 76	Monarchy abolished in 1918.

== Coats of arms of Wettin lands ==
Arch-Marshals of the Holy Roman Empire

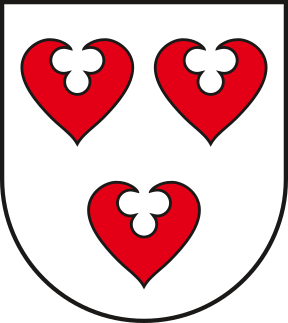
Counts of Brehna

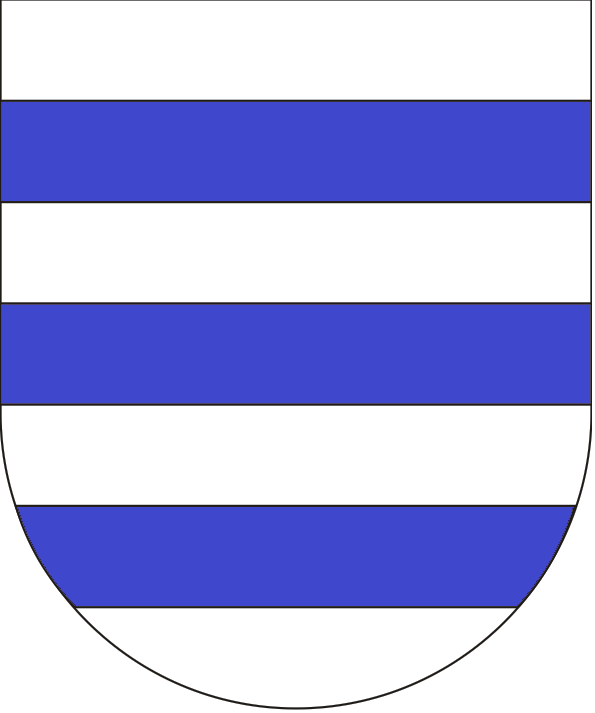
Counts of Eisenberg

Counts of Henneberg

Margraves of Landsberg

Margraves of Lower Lusatia

Margraves of Upper Lusatia

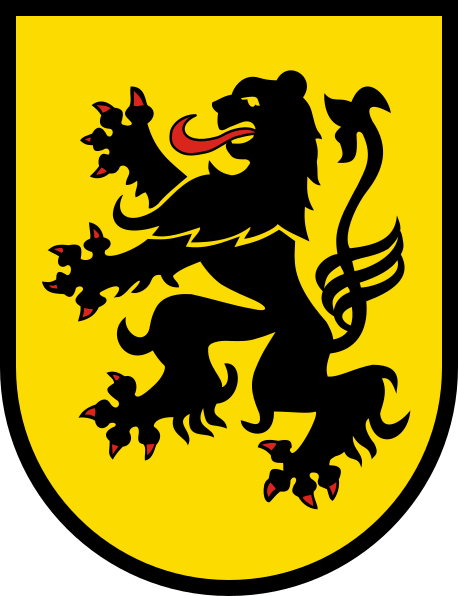
Margraves of Meissen

Counts of Orlamünde

Dukes of Saxony

Kings of Saxony

Counts palatine of Saxony

Counts palatine of Thuringia

Landgraves of Thuringia

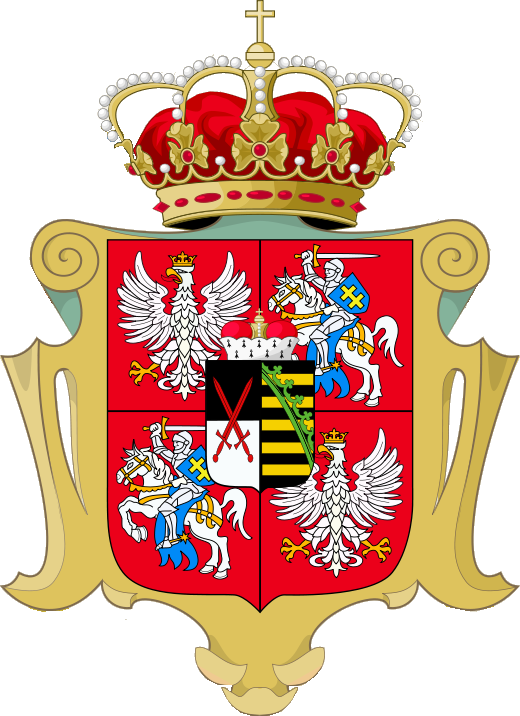
King of Poland and Grand Duke of Lithuania

For an extensive treatment of the coats of arms, see: Coat of arms of Saxony

or in French: Armorial de la maison de Wettin

== See also ==
- List of members of the House of Wettin
- Rulers of Saxony, a list containing many Wettins
- Wettin, Saxony-Anhalt, the city from which the Wettin dynasty originated
- Coinage of Saxony
- Free Saxony, monarchist political party
- Saxon Renaissance, regional type of architecture

== Sources ==
- Blaschke, Karlheinz (2002). "Die Leipziger Teilung der wettinischen Länder von 1485". Beiträge zur Verfassungs- und Verwaltungsgeschichte Sachsens: Ausgewählte Aufsätze von Karlheinz Blaschke. Leipzig: Leipziger Universitätsverlag. pp. 323–335.
- Groß, Reiner (2007). Die Wettiner. Stuttgart: Kohlhammer Verlag.
- Heinze, Erich (1925). "Die Entwicklung der Pfalzgrafschaft Sachsen bis ins 14. Jahrhundert". Sachsen und Anhalt: Jahrbuch der Historischen Kommission für die Provinz Sachsen und für Anhalt. 1: 20–63.
- Pätzold, Stefan (1997). Die frühen Wettiner: Adelsfamilie und Hausüberlieferung bis 1221. Köln: Böhlau Verlag.
- Rudersdorf, Manfred (2009). "Kursachsen im politischen System des Alten Reiches: Staatsbildung, Religionspolitik und dynastische Rivalität im Zeichen der wettinischen Weichenstellung von 1547" (PDF). Neues Archiv für sächsische Geschichte. 80: 105–127.
- Tebruck, Stefan (2005). "Zwischen Integration und Selbstbehauptung: Thüringen im wettinischen Herrschaftsbereich". Fragen der politischen Integration im mittelalterlichen Europa. Ostfildern: Jan Thorbecke Verlag. pp. 375–412, 589–591.
- Whaley, Joachim (2012a). Germany and the Holy Roman Empire, I: From Maximilian I to the Peace of Westphalia 1493-1648. Vol. 1. New York: Oxford University Press.
- Whaley, Joachim (2012b). Germany and the Holy Roman Empire, II: From the Peace of Westphalia to the Dissolution of the Reich 1648-1806. Vol. 2. New York: Oxford University Press.
- Wilson, Peter H. (2016). Heart of Europe: A History of the Holy Roman Empire. Cambridge: Harvard University Press.
