= Hedwig of Mecklenburg-Güstrow =

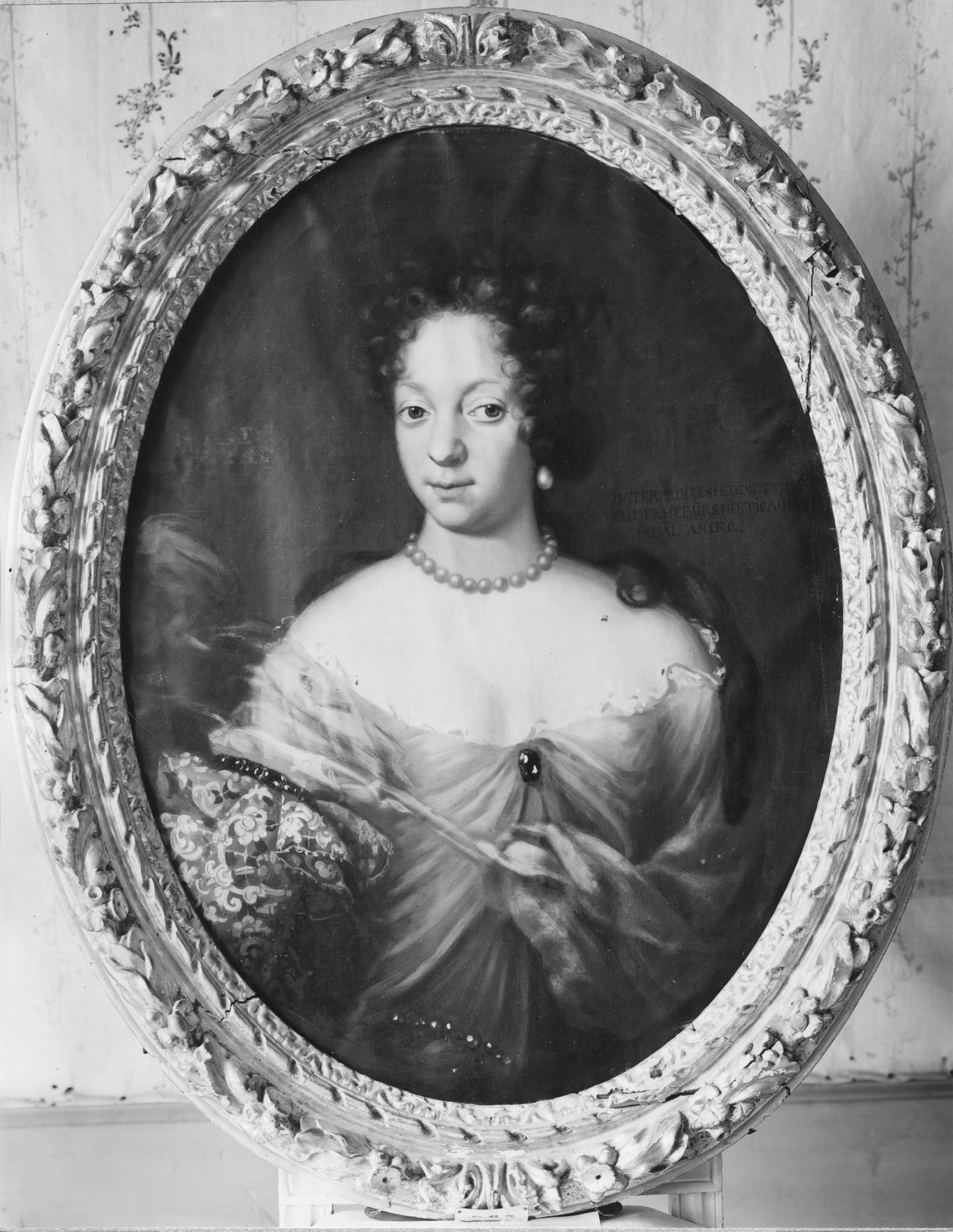

Duchess consort of Saxe-Merseburg-Zörbig
- Tenure: 1691-1715
- Born: 12 January 1666; Güstrow
- Died: 9 August 1735 (aged 69); Zörbig
- Spouse: August, Duke of Saxe-Merseburg-Zörbig
- Issue: Princess Caroline Auguste
- House: Mecklenburg
- Father: Gustav Adolph, Duke of Mecklenburg-Güstrow
- Mother: Magdalene Sibylle of Holstein-Gottorp

Hedwig of Mecklenburg-Güstrow (Hedwig Eleonore; 12 January 1666 – 9 August 1735) was a German noblewoman, a member of the House of Mecklenburg by birth and by marriage a Duchess of Saxe-Merseburg-Zörbig.

Born in Güstrow, she was the eighth of eleven children born from the marriage of Gustav Adolph, Duke of Mecklenburg-Güstrow and Magdalene Sibylle of Holstein-Gottorp. Of her ten older and younger siblings, eight survived to mature adulthood: Marie (by marriage a Duchess of Mecklenburg-Strelitz), Magdalene, Sophie (by marriage a Duchess of Württemberg-Oels), Christine (by marriage a Countess of Stolberg-Gedern), Charles, Hereditary Prince of Mecklenburg-Güstrow, Louise (by marriage a Queen of Denmark and Norway), Elisabeth (by marriage a Duchess of Saxe-Merseburg-Spremberg) and Augusta.

== Life ==
In Güstrow on 1 December 1686, Hedwig married Prince August of Saxe-Merseburg, the second surviving son of Duke Christian I. Five years later (1691), August received the town of Zörbig as his appanage and took up his residence there.

They had eight children of whom only one survived to adulthood:

1. Christiane Magdalene (Zörbig, 11 March 1687 - Merseburg, 21 March 1689), died in early childhood.
2. Stillborn daughter (Alt-Stargard, Mecklenburg, 30 December 1689).
3. Caroline Auguste (Zörbig, 10 March 1691 - Zörbig, 23 September 1743).
4. Hedwig Eleonore (Zörbig, 26 February 1693 - Zörbig, 31 August 1693), died in infancy.
5. Gustav Frederick, Hereditary Prince of Saxe-Merseburg-Zörbig (Zörbig, 28 October 1694 - Zörbig, 24 May 1695), died in infancy.
6. August, Hereditary Prince of Saxe-Merseburg-Zörbig (Zörbig, 26 February 1696 - Zörbig, 26 March 1696), died in infancy.
7. Stillborn twin son (1707).
8. Stillborn twin son (1707).

Hedwig died in Zörbig, aged 69, and was buried in Merseburg Cathedral.

== See also ==
- BWV Anh. 16

Hedwig of Mecklenburg-Güstrow House of Mecklenburg Born: 12 January 1666 Died: 9 August 1735
German royalty
New creation	Duchess consort of Saxe-Merseburg-Zörbig; 1691-1715	Merged to the Duchy of Saxe-Merseburg
