= Elisabeth of Mecklenburg-Güstrow =

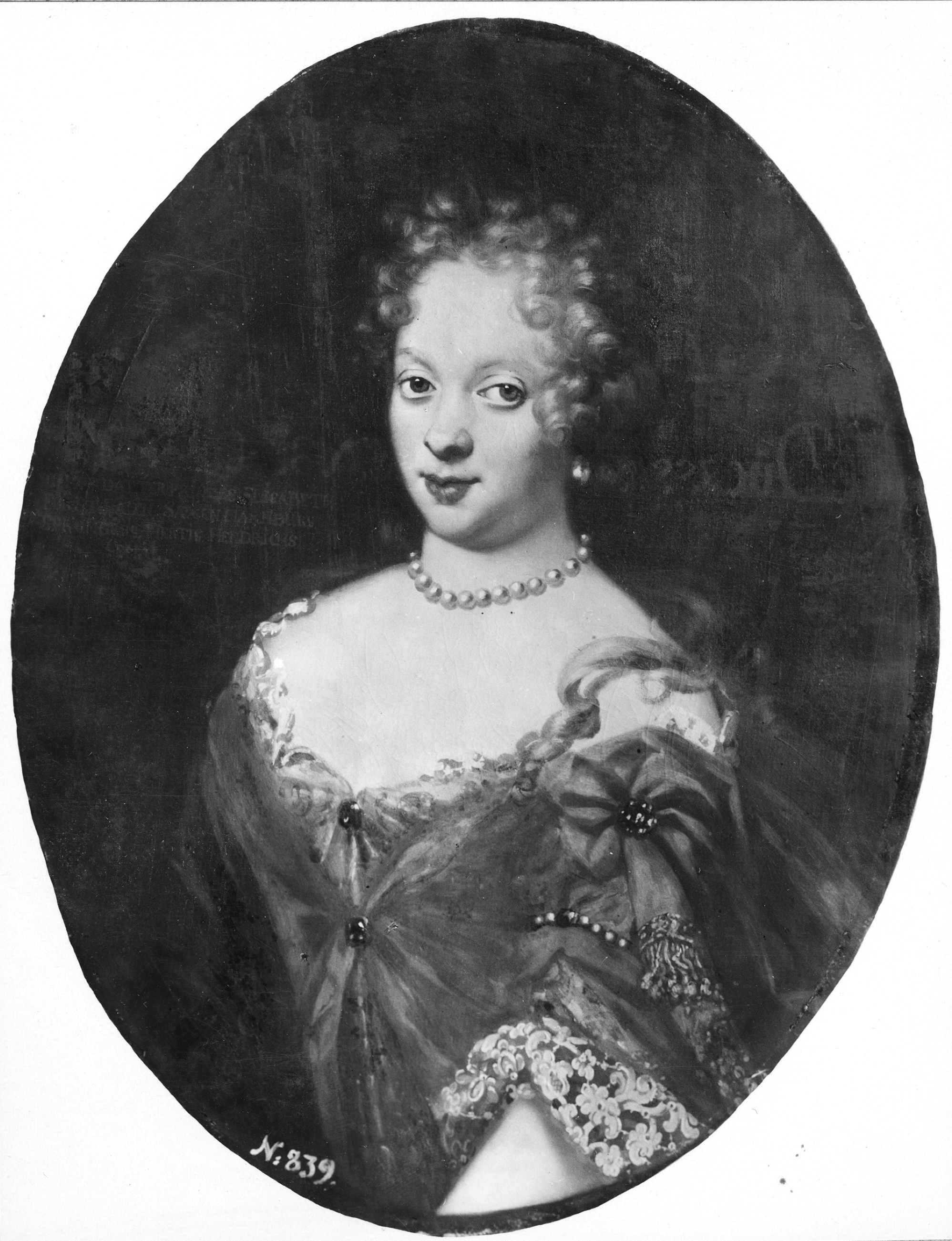
- Portrait attributed to David von Krafft

Duchess consort of Saxe-Merseburg-Spremberg
- Tenure: 1694-1731

Duchess consort of Saxe-Merseburg
- Tenure: 1731-1738
- Born: 3 September 1668; Güstrow
- Died: 25 August 1738 (aged 69); Doberlug
- Spouse: Henry, Duke of Saxe-Merseburg
- Issue: Princess Christiana Fredericka
- House: Mecklenburg
- Father: Gustav Adolph, Duke of Mecklenburg-Güstrow
- Mother: Magdalene Sibylle of Holstein-Gottorp

Elisabeth of Mecklenburg-Güstrow (3 September 1668 – 25 August 1738) was a German noblewoman, a member of the House of Mecklenburg by birth and by marriage a Duchess of Saxe-Merseburg-Spremberg (1692-1731) and Saxe-Merseburg (1731-1738).

Born in Güstrow, she was the tenth of eleven children born from the marriage of Gustav Adolph, Duke of Mecklenburg-Güstrow and Magdalene Sibylle of Holstein-Gottorp. From her ten older and younger siblings, eight survive adulthood: Marie (by marriage a Duchess of Mecklenburg-Strelitz), Magdalene, Sophie (by marriage a Duchess of Württemberg-Oels), Christine (by marriage a Countess of Stolberg-Gedern), Charles, Hereditary Prince of Mecklenburg-Güstrow, Hedwig (by marriage a Duchess of Saxe-Merseburg-Zörbig), Louise (by marriage a Queen of Denmark and Norway) and Augusta.

== Life ==
In Güstrow on 29 March 1692, Elisabeth married Prince Henry of Saxe-Merseburg, the fourth surviving son of Duke Christian I. Two years later (1694), Henry received the town of Spremberg as his appanage and took up his residence there.

The marriage produced three children, of whom only one survived to adulthood:

1. Maurice, Hereditary Prince of Saxe-Spremberg (Spremberg, 29 October 1694 - Spremberg, 11 April 1695), died in infancy.
2. Christiana Fredericka (Spremberg, 17 May 1697 - Spremberg, 21 August 1722).
3. Gustava Magdalena (Spremberg, 2 October 1699 - Spremberg, 3 October 1699), died in infancy.

Elisabeth became Duchess of Saxe-Merseburg in 1731 after her husband inherited the main domains of the family as their last surviving male member. She died in Doberlug in 1738, aged 69, having survived her husband by one month, and was buried in Merseburg Cathedral.

Elisabeth of Mecklenburg-Güstrow House of Mecklenburg Born: 3 September 1668 Died: 25 August 1738
German royalty
New creation	Duchess consort of Saxe-Merseburg-Spremberg; 1694-1731	Merged to the Duchy of Saxe-Merseburg
Preceded by Henriette Charlotte of Nassau-Idstein	Duchess consort of Saxe-Merseburg; 1731-1738	Duchy reverted to the Electorate of Saxony
