= Gustav Adolph, Duke of Mecklenburg-Güstrow =

Last Duke of Mecklenburg-Güstrow and last Administrator of Ratzeburg

Gustav Adolph
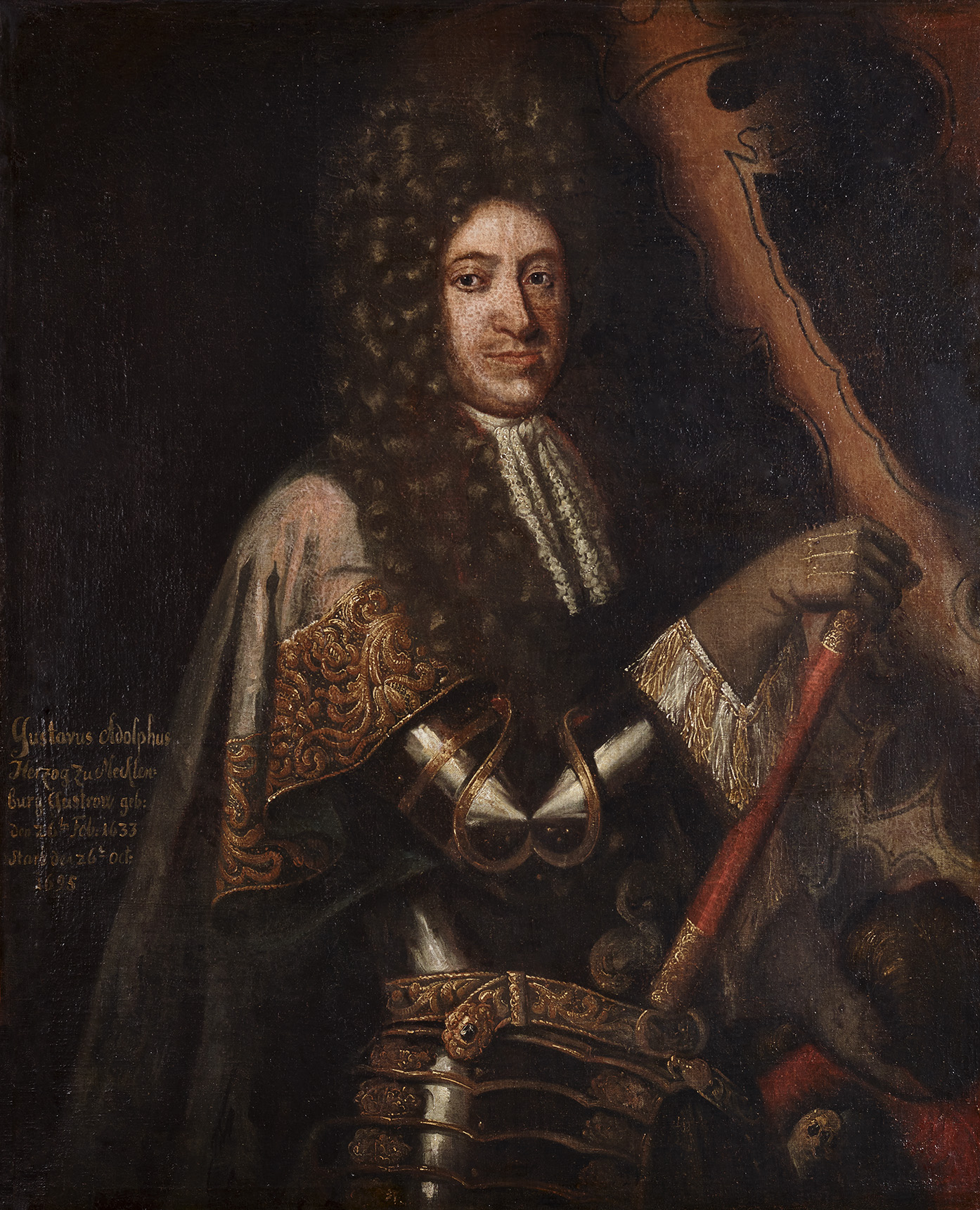
- Portrait by unknown, 17th century
- Born: 26 February 1633; Güstrow
- Died: 6 October 1695 (aged 62); Güstrow
- Spouse: Magdalene Sibylle of Holstein-Gottorp (m. 1654)
- Issue Detail: John, Hereditary Prince of Mecklenburg-Güstrow; Princess Eleonore; Marie, Duchess of Mecklenburg-Strelitz; Princess Magdalene; Sophie, Duchess of Württemberg-Oels; Christine, Countess of Stolberg-Gedern; Charles, Hereditary Prince of Mecklenburg-Güstrow; Hedwig, Duchess of Saxe-Merseburg-Zörbig; Louise, Queen of Denmark; Elisabeth, Duchess of Saxe-Merseburg; Princess Augusta
- House: Mecklenburg
- Father: John Albert II, Duke of Mecklenburg
- Mother: Eleonore Marie of Anhalt-Bernburg

Gustav Adolph, Duke of Mecklenburg [-Güstrow] (26 February 1633 – 6 October 1695) was the last ruler of Mecklenburg-Güstrow from 1636 until his death and last Lutheran Administrator of the Prince-Bishopric of Ratzeburg from 1636 to 1648.

== Life ==
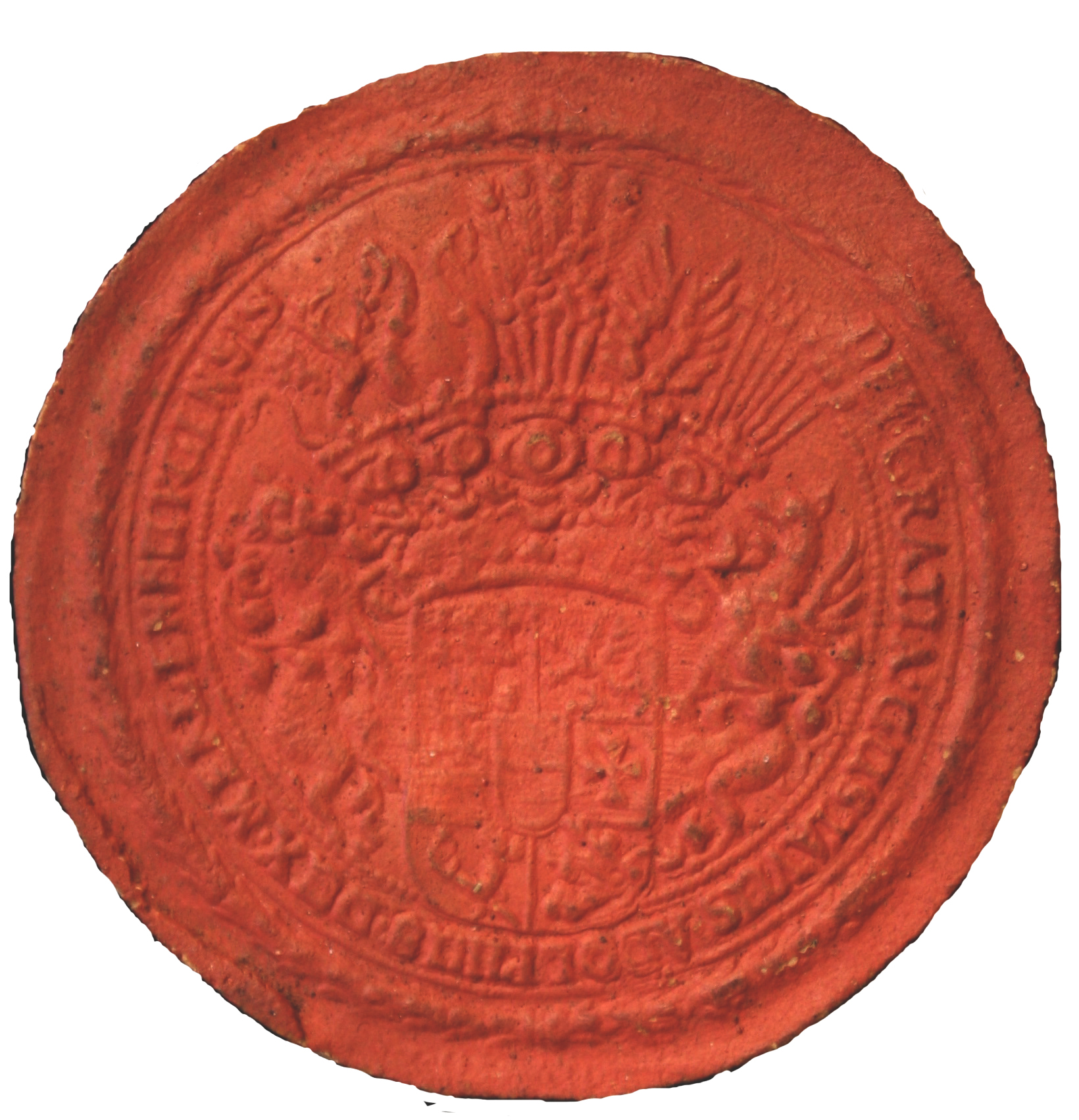
Wafer of Gustav Adolph, 1672

Gustav Adolph was born at the ducal residence in Güstrow, the son of Duke John Albert II and his third wife Eleonore Marie (1600–1657), daughter of Prince Christian I of Anhalt-Bernburg.

As Gustav Adolph was a minor when his father died in 1636, his uncle Duke Adolph Frederick I of Mecklenburg-Schwerin at first became regent at Güstrow. This was fiercely opposed by Gustav Adolph's mother. In 1654 he came of age and married Magdalene Sibylle, a daughter of Duke Frederick III of Holstein-Gottorp. Their marriage produced eleven children:

- Johann, Hereditary Prince of Mecklenburg-Güstrow (2 December 1655 – 6 February 1660).
- Eleonore (1 June 1657 – 24 February 1672).
- Marie (19 June 1659 – 6 January 1701), married on 23 September 1684 to Duke Adolph Frederick II of Mecklenburg-Strelitz.
- Magdalene (5 July 1660 – 19 February 1702).
- Sophie (21 June 1662 – 1 June 1738), married on 6 December 1700 to Duke Christian Ulrich I of Württemberg-Oels.
- Christine (14 August 1663 – 3 August 1749), married on 4 May 1683 to Louis Christian, Count of Stolberg-Gedern.
- Charles, Hereditary Prince of Mecklenburg-Güstrow (18 November 1664 – 15 March 1688), married on 10 August 1687 to Marie Amalie of Brandenburg, a daughter of Elector Frederick William.
- Hedwig (12 January 1666 – 9 August 1735), married on 1 December 1686 to Duke August of Saxe-Merseburg-Zörbig.
- Louise (28 August 1667 – 15 March 1721), married on 5 December 1696 to King Frederick IV of Denmark.
- Elisabeth (3 September 1668 – 25 August 1738), married on 29 March 1692 to Duke Henry of Saxe-Merseburg-Spremberg.
- Augusta (27 December 1674 – 19 May 1756).

The death of the only surviving son, the Hereditary Prince Charles, in 1688 at the age of 23, caused a succession crisis in Mecklenburg-Güstrow. Gustav Adolph's daughter Marie married her cousin Adolphus Frederick II of Mecklenburg, who after the death of his father-in-law claimed the Güstrow heritage, but could not prevail against the ruling duke of Mecklenburg-Schwerin. A younger daughter, Louise in 1695 married the Danish crown prince Frederick IV and in 1699 became queen consort of Denmark.

Gustav Adolph died in Güstrow at the age of 62. The subsequent inheritance conflict within the House of Mecklenburg was settled by the establishment of the Duchy of Mecklenburg-Strelitz in 1701.

== Ancestry ==
Ancestors of Gustav Adolph, Duke of Mecklenburg-Güstrow

8. John Albert I, Duke of Mecklenburg
4. John VII, Duke of Mecklenburg-Schwerin
9. Anna Sophia of Prussia
2. John Albert II, Duke of Mecklenburg
10. Adolf, Duke of Holstein-Gottorp
5. Sophia of Holstein-Gottorp
11. Christine of Hesse
1. Gustav Adolph, Duke of Mecklenburg-Güstrow
12. Joachim Ernest, Prince of Anhalt
6. Christian I, Prince of Anhalt-Bernburg
13. Agnes of Barby-Mühlingen
3. Eleonore Marie of Anhalt-Bernburg
14. Arnold III, Count of Bentheim-Steinfurt-Tecklenburg-Limburg
7. Anna of Bentheim-Tecklenburg
15. Magdalena of Neuenahr-Alpen

Gustav Adolph, Duke of Mecklenburg-Güstrow House of Mecklenburg-Güstrow Cadet branch of the House of Mecklenburg Born: 26 February 1633 Died: 6 October 1695
German nobility
Religious titles
Preceded by Augustus	Administrator of the Prince-Bishopric of Ratzeburg; 1636–1648	prince-bishopric secularised as Principality of Ratzeburg
German nobility
Preceded by John Albert II	Duke of Mecklenburg-Güstrow; 1636–1695	Succeeded by Frederick William as Duke of Mecklenburg-Schwerin
