= Duchess Christine of Mecklenburg-Güstrow =

Christine of Mecklenburg-Güstrow
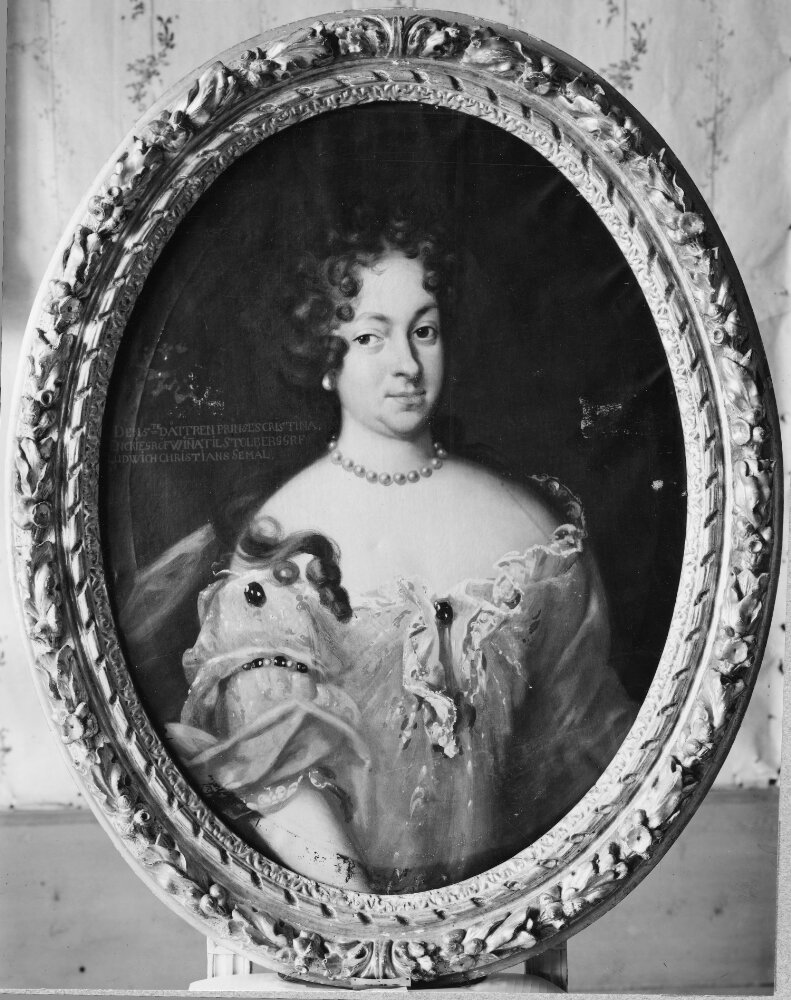

Countess consort of Stolberg-Gedern
- Tenure: 1683-1710
- Born: 14 August 1663; Güstrow
- Died: 3 August 1749 (aged 85); Gedern
- Spouse: Louis Christian, Count of Stolberg-Gedern
- Issue: Fredericka Charlotte, Countess of Solms-Laubach; Emilie Auguste, Countess of Stolberg-Rossla; Christian Ernest, Count of Stolberg-Wernigerode; Christine Eleonore, Countess of Isenburg-Büdingen in Büdingen; Frederick Charles, Prince of Stolberg-Gedern; Ernestine Wilhelmine, Countess of Isenburg-Büdingen in Wächtersbach; Henry August, Count of Stolberg-Schwarza; Countess Sophie Christiane; Ferdinande Henriette, Countess of Erbach-Schönberg; Princess Auguste Marie; Philippina Louise, Countess of Count of Isenburg-Philippseich
- House: Mecklenburg
- Father: Gustav Adolph, Duke of Mecklenburg-Güstrow
- Mother: Magdalene Sibylle of Holstein-Gottorp

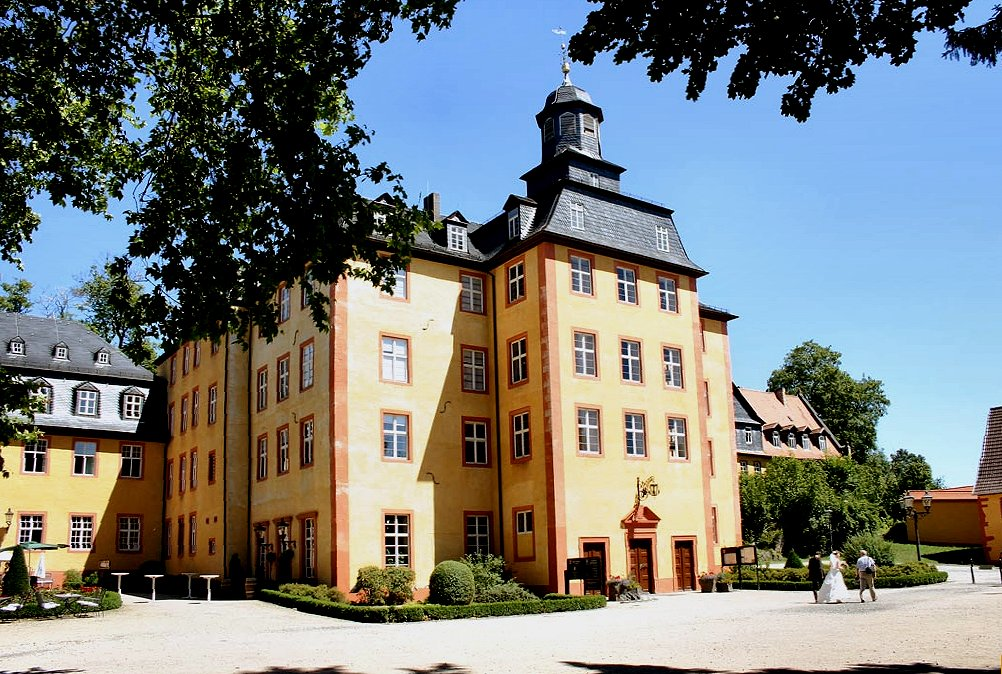
Schloss Gedern, residence of the Stolberg-Gedern line of the family

Christine of Mecklenburg-Güstrow (14 August 1663 – 3 August 1749) was a German noblewoman of the House of Mecklenburg and by marriage a Countess of Stolberg-Gedern.

== Early life and ancestry ==
Born in Güstrow into the Güstrow line of the ancient House of Mecklenburg, she was the sixth of eleven children born from the marriage of Gustav Adolph, Duke of Mecklenburg-Güstrow and Magdalene Sibylle of Holstein-Gottorp.

Of her ten older and younger siblings, eight survived to mature adulthood: Marie (by marriage a Duchess of Mecklenburg-Strelitz), Magdalene, Sophie (by marriage a Duchess of Württemberg-Oels), Charles, Hereditary Prince of Mecklenburg-Güstrow, Hedwig (by marriage a Duchess of Saxe-Merseburg-Zörbig), Louise (by marriage a Queen of Denmark and Norway), Elisabeth (by marriage a Duchess of Saxe-Merseburg-Spremberg) and Augusta.

== Life ==
In Güstrow on 14 May 1683, Christine married Louis Christian, Count of Stolberg-Gedern (1652–1710) as his second wife. Between 1684 and 1705, she had 19 pregnancies and gave birth to 23 children (including 4 sets of twins), of which only 11 survived to adulthood:

1. Gustav Adolph, Hereditary Prince of Stolberg-Gedern (born and died Gedern, 17 January 1684).
2. A daughter (born and died Gedern, 17 January 1684), twin of Gustav Adolph.
3. Gustav Ernest, Hereditary Prince of Stolberg-Gedern (Gedern, 10 March 1685 - Gedern, 14 June 1689), died in early childhood.
4. Fredericka Charlotte (Gedern, 3 April 1686 - Laubach, 10 January 1739), married on 8 December 1709 to Frederick Ernest, Count of Solms-Laubach.
5. Emilie Auguste (Gedern, 11 May 1687 - Rossla, 30 June 1730), married on 1 October 1709 to Jost Christian, Count of Stolberg-Rossla (her first-cousin).
6. Christiana Louise (Gedern, 6 April 1688 - Gedern, 11 August 1691), died in early childhood.
7. Albertine Antonie (Gedern, 15 April 1689 - Gedern, 16 August 1691), died in early childhood.
8. Charles Louis, Hereditary Prince of Stolberg-Gedern (Gedern, 15 April 1689 - Gedern, 6 August 1691), twin of Albertine Antonie, died in early childhood.
9. Gustave Magdalene (Gedern, 6 April 1690 - Gedern, 22 March 1691), died in infancy.
10. Christian Ernest, Count of Stolberg-Wernigerode (Gedern, 2 April 1691 - Wernigerode, 25 October 1771).
11. Christine Eleonore (Gedern, 12 September 1692 - Büdingen, 30 January 1745), married on 8 August 1708 to Ernest Casimir I, Count of Isenburg-Büdingen zu Büdingen.
12. Frederick Charles, Prince of Stolberg-Gedern (Gedern, 11 October 1693 - Gedern, 28 September 1767).
13. Ernestine Wilhelmine (Gedern, 29 January 1695 - Wächtersbach, 7 May 1759), married on 7 December 1725 to Ferdinand Maximilian, Count of Isenburg und Büdingen zu Wächtersbach.
14. Fredericka Louise (Gedern, 20 January 1696 - Gedern, 24 April 1697), died in early childhood.
15. Louis Adolph (Gedern, 17 June 1697 - Gedern, 6 January 1698), died in infancy.
16. Henry August, Count of Stolberg-Schwarza (Gedern, 17 June 1697 - Schwarza, 14 September 1748), twin of Louis Adolph.
17. Sophie Christiane (Gedern, 17 August 1698 - Gedern, 14 June 1771), died unmarried.
18. Ferdinande Henriette (Gedern, 2 October 1699 - Schönberg, Odenwald, 31 January 1750), married on 15 December 1719 to George August, Count of Erbach-Schönberg. Through her, Christine was a great-great-great-grandmother of Queen Victoria of the United Kingdom.
19. Rudolph Lebrecht (Gedern, 17 September 1701 - Gedern, 6 April 1702), died in infancy.
20. Louis Christian (Gedern, 17 September 1701 - Gedern, 22 November 1701), twin of Rudolph Lebrecht, died in infancy.
21. Auguste Marie (Gedern, 28 November 1702 - Herford, 3 July 1768), a nun in Herford, created a princess in 1742.
22. Caroline Adolphine (Gedern, 27 April 1704 - Gedern, 10 February 1707), died in early childhood.
23. Philippina Louise (Gedern, 20 October 1705 - Philippseich, 1 November 1744), married on 2 April 1725 to William Maurice II, Count of Isenburg-Philippseich.

Only six of Christine's children were still alive at the time of her death.

== See also ==
- List of people with the most children
