= Frederick II of Hesse-Kassel =

Landgrave of Hesse-Kassel from 1760 to 1785

Frederick II
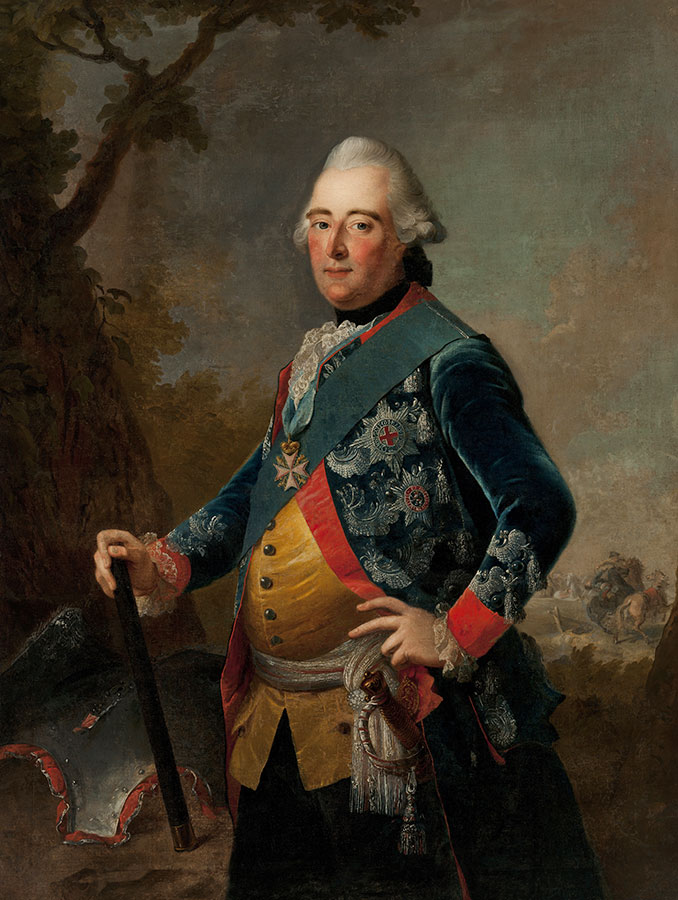
- Portrait by Johann Heinrich Tischbein

Landgrave of Hesse-Kassel
- Reign: 1 February 1760 – 31 October 1785
- Predecessor: William VIII
- Successor: William IX
- Born: 14 August 1720; Kassel
- Died: 31 October 1785 (aged 65); Kassel
- Spouse: Princess Mary of Great Britain (m. 1740; died 1772) Margravine Philippine of Brandenburg-Schwedt (m. 1773)
- Issue: Prince William; William I, Elector of Hesse; Prince Charles; Prince Frederick
- House: Hesse
- Father: William VIII, Landgrave of Hesse-Kassel
- Mother: Dorothea Wilhelmina of Saxe-Zeitz
- Religion: Roman Catholicism, prev. Calvinism

Frederick II (German: Landgraf Friedrich II. von Hessen-Kassel) (14 August 1720 – 31 October 1785) was Landgrave of Hesse-Kassel (or Hesse-Cassel) from 1760 to 1785. He ruled as an enlightened despot, and raised money by renting soldiers (called "Hessians") to Great Britain to help fight the American Revolutionary War. He combined Enlightenment ideas with Christian values, cameralist plans for central control of the economy, and a militaristic approach toward international diplomacy.

== Early life ==
Frederick was born at Kassel in Hesse, the son of William VIII, Landgrave of Hesse-Kassel and his wife Dorothea Wilhelmine of Saxe-Zeitz. His paternal grandfather was Charles I, Landgrave of Hesse-Kassel, and his paternal uncle was Frederick I of Sweden. His education was initially entrusted to Colonel August Moritz von Donop and then from 1726 to 1733 to the Swiss theologian and philosopher, Jean-Pierre de Crousaz.

== Marriages and children ==
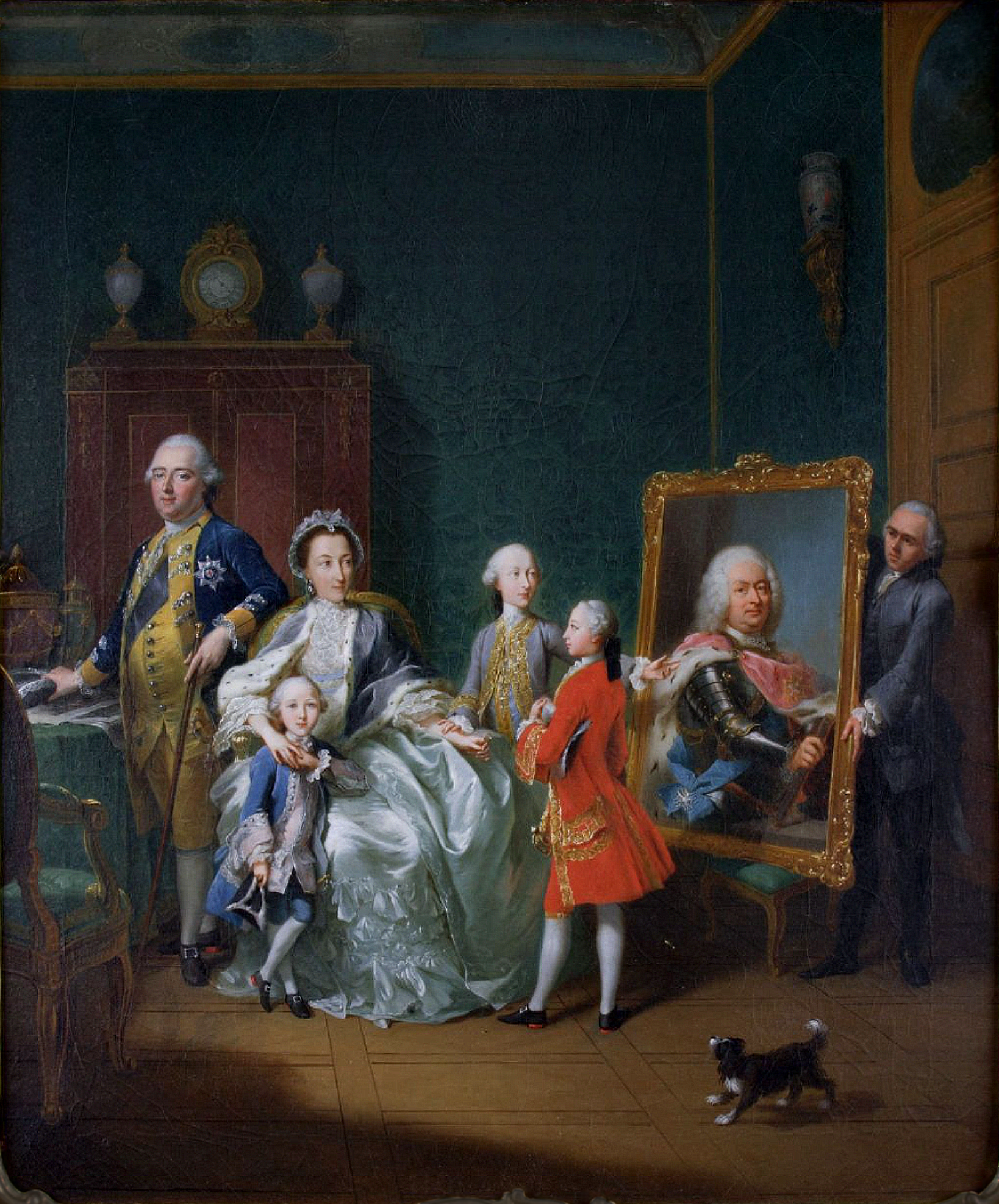
Hereditary Prince Frederick with his family by Johann Heinrich Tischbein, 1754.

On 8 May 1740, by proxy in London, and on 28 June 1740 in person in Kassel, Frederick married Princess Mary, fourth daughter of King George II of Great Britain and Caroline of Ansbach. The King favoured the marriage of his daughter with a Protestant noble.

They had four sons:

1. William (25 December 1741 – 1 July 1742)
2. William I, Elector of Hesse (3 June 1743 – 27 February 1821)
3. Charles (19 December 1744 – 17 August 1836), father of Princess Louise Caroline of Hesse-Kassel and grandfather of Christian IX of Denmark.
4. Frederick (11 September 1747 – 20 May 1837), father of Prince William of Hesse-Kassel and grandfather of Queen Louise of Denmark.

In December 1745, Frederick landed in Scotland with 6000 Hessian troops to support his father-in-law, George II of Great Britain, in dealing with the Jacobite rising. Although he supported the "Protestant succession" in Great Britain on this occasion, Frederick later converted from Calvinism to Catholicism. In February 1749, Frederick and his father visited the Archbishop-Elector of Cologne, Clemens August of Bavaria, who received Frederick into the Catholic Church.

Despite his exertions in support of her father, Frederick's marriage with the British princess was not a happy one. The couple were living apart from each other by 1747, and were formally separated in 1755. Mary moved to Denmark the following year to care for the children of her late sister Louise of Great Britain, who had died in 1751. All three of the couple's surviving sons moved with Mary to Denmark. Two of them, including Frederick's heir William, later married Danish princesses, their first cousins. The younger sons lived permanently in Denmark, rising to high office in the court of their cousin; only William returned to Germany upon inheriting the principality of Hanau. He also later succeeded Frederick as Landgrave of Hesse-Kassel.

Mary died in 1772, and Frederick lost little time in marrying again. On 10 January 1773, at Berlin, he married Margravine Philippine, daughter of Frederick William, Margrave of Brandenburg-Schwedt and Sophia Dorothea of Prussia. No children were born of this marriage.

== Ruler ==
After being formally separated from his wife in 1755, Friedrich entered active service in the Prussian military. In 1760, he succeeded his father as Landgrave of Hesse-Kassel. Despite Frederick's Catholicism, the principality remained Calvinist, and Frederick's children were raised as Protestants in Denmark.

During the 17th and 18th centuries, it was a fairly widespread practice for smaller principalities to rent out troops to other princes. However, this was carried on to excess in Hesse-Kassel, which maintained 7% of its population under arms throughout the eighteenth century. Frederick hired out so many troops to his nephew, King George III of Great Britain, for use in the American War of Independence, that "Hessian" has become an American term for all German soldiers deployed by the British in the War. Frederick used the revenue to finance his patronage of the arts and his opulent lifestyle. The architect Simon Louis du Ry transformed for Frederick II the town of Kassel into a modern capital.

Landgrave Frederick II died in 1785 at Weißenstein castle (Schloss Wilhelmshöhe) in Kassel. He was succeeded by his eldest surviving son, William.

== Ancestry ==
Ancestors of Frederick II of Hesse-Kassel

8. William VI, Landgrave of Hesse-Kassel
4. Charles I, Landgrave of Hesse-Kassel
9. Princess Hedwig Sophie of Brandenburg
2. William VIII, Landgrave of Hesse-Kassel
10. Jacob Kettler
5. Maria Amalia of Courland
11. Princess Louise Charlotte of Brandenburg
1. Frederick II, Landgrave of Hesse-Kassel
12. Maurice, Duke of Saxe-Zeitz
6. Moritz Wilhelm, Duke of Saxe-Zeitz
13. Dorothea Maria of Saxe-Weimar, Duchess of Saxe-Zeitz
3. Princess Dorothea Wilhelmine of Saxe-Zeitz
14. Frederick William, Elector of Brandenburg
7. Marie Amalie of Brandenburg
15. Princess Dorothea Sophie of Schleswig-Holstein-Sonderburg-Glücksburg

Frederick II of Hesse-Kassel House of Hesse Born: 14 August 1720 Died: 31 October 1785
Regnal titles
Preceded by William VIII	Landgrave of Hesse-Kassel; 1760–1785	Succeeded by William IX
