= Magdalena Sibylla of Holstein-Gottorp =

Duchess of Mecklenburg-Güstrow (1639–1719)

Magdalena Sibylle of Holstein-Gottorp
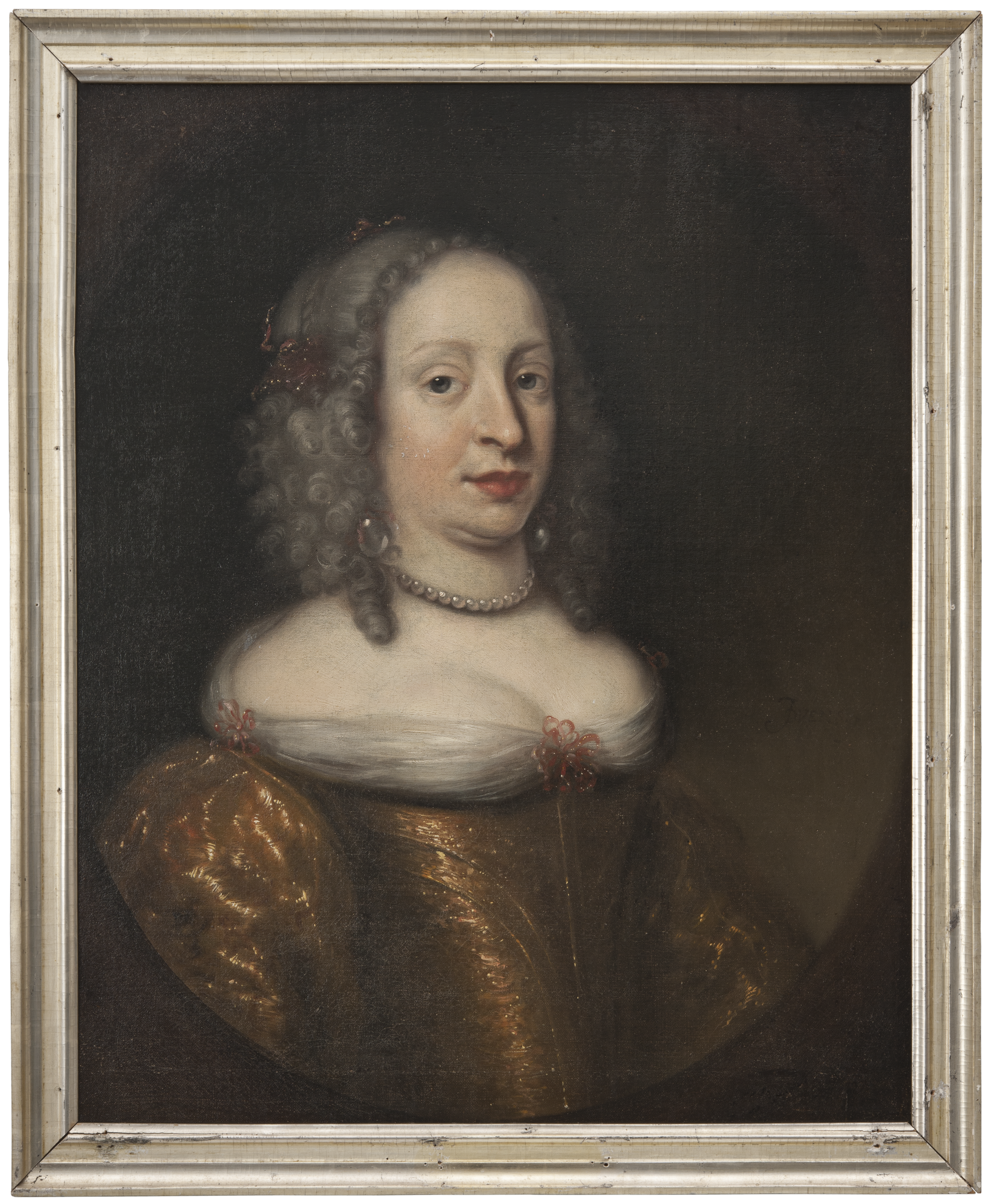
- Portrait attributed to Jürgen Ovens, 1651
- Born: 24 November 1631; Gottorp Castle
- Died: 22 September 1719 (aged 87); Güstrow
- Spouse: Gustav Adolph, Duke of Mecklenburg-Güstrow (m. 1654; died 1695)
- Issue Detail: John, Hereditary Prince of Mecklenburg-Güstrow; Princess Eleonore; Marie, Duchess of Mecklenburg-Strelitz; Princess Magdalene; Sophie, Duchess of Württemberg-Oels; Christine, Countess of Stolberg-Gedern; Charles, Hereditary Prince of Mecklenburg-Güstrow; Hedwig, Duchess of Saxe-Merseburg-Zörbig; Louise, Queen of Denmark; Elisabeth, Duchess of Saxe-Merseburg; Princess Augusta
- House: Holstein-Gottorp (by birth); Mecklenburg (by marriage)
- Father: Frederick III, Duke of Holstein-Gottorp
- Mother: Duchess Marie Elisabeth of Saxony

Magdalena Sibylle of Holstein-Gottorp (also spelled Magdalena Sibylla; 24 November 1631 at Gottorp Castle – 22 September 1719 in Güstrow) was a Duchess of Holstein-Gottorp by birth and by marriage a Duchess of Mecklenburg-Güstrow. From 1654 to 1695, she was the consort of Duke Gustav Adolph of Mecklenburg-Güstrow.

== Background ==
Magdalene Sybille was the second daughter of Duke Frederick III of Schleswig-Holstein-Gottorp (1597–1659) and his wife Marie Elisabeth of Saxony (1610–1684).

== Marriage and issue ==
On 28 December 1654, she married Gustav Adolph, the ruling Duke of Mecklenburg-Güstrow. Although nine of their eleven children lived to mature adulthood, they had no surviving male heirs. This led to a succession dispute that was settled by the Partition of Hamburg (1701), which redivided the interior of the Duchy of Mecklenburg among the surviving lines.

- Johann, Hereditary Prince of Mecklenburg-Güstrow (2 December 1655 – 6 February 1660), died in early childhood.
- Eleonore (1 June 1657 – 24 February 1672), died in adolescence.
- Marie (June 19, 1659 – 6 January 1701), married on 23 September 1684 to Duke Adolph Frederick II of Mecklenburg-Strelitz.
- Magdalene (5 July 1660 – 19 February 1702).
- Sophie (21 June 1662 – 1 June 1738), married on 6 December 1700 to Duke Christian Ulrich I of Württemberg-Oels.
- Christine (14 August 1663 – 3 August 1749), married on 4 May 1683 to Louis Christian, Count of Stolberg-Gedern.
- Charles, Hereditary Prince of Mecklenburg-Güstrow (18 November 1664 – 15 March 1688), married on 10 August 1687 to Marie Amalie of Brandenburg, a daughter of Elector Frederick William. He died unexpectedly of smallpox.
- Hedwig (12 January 1666 – 9 August 1735), married on 1 December 1686 to Duke August of Saxe-Merseburg-Zörbig.
- Louise (28 August 1667 – 15 March 1721), married on 5 December 1696 to King Frederick IV of Denmark.
- Elisabeth (3 September 1668 – 25 August 1738), married on 29 March 1692 to Duke Henry of Saxe-Merseburg-Spremberg.
- Augusta (27 December 1674 – 19 May 1756).

== Gallery ==
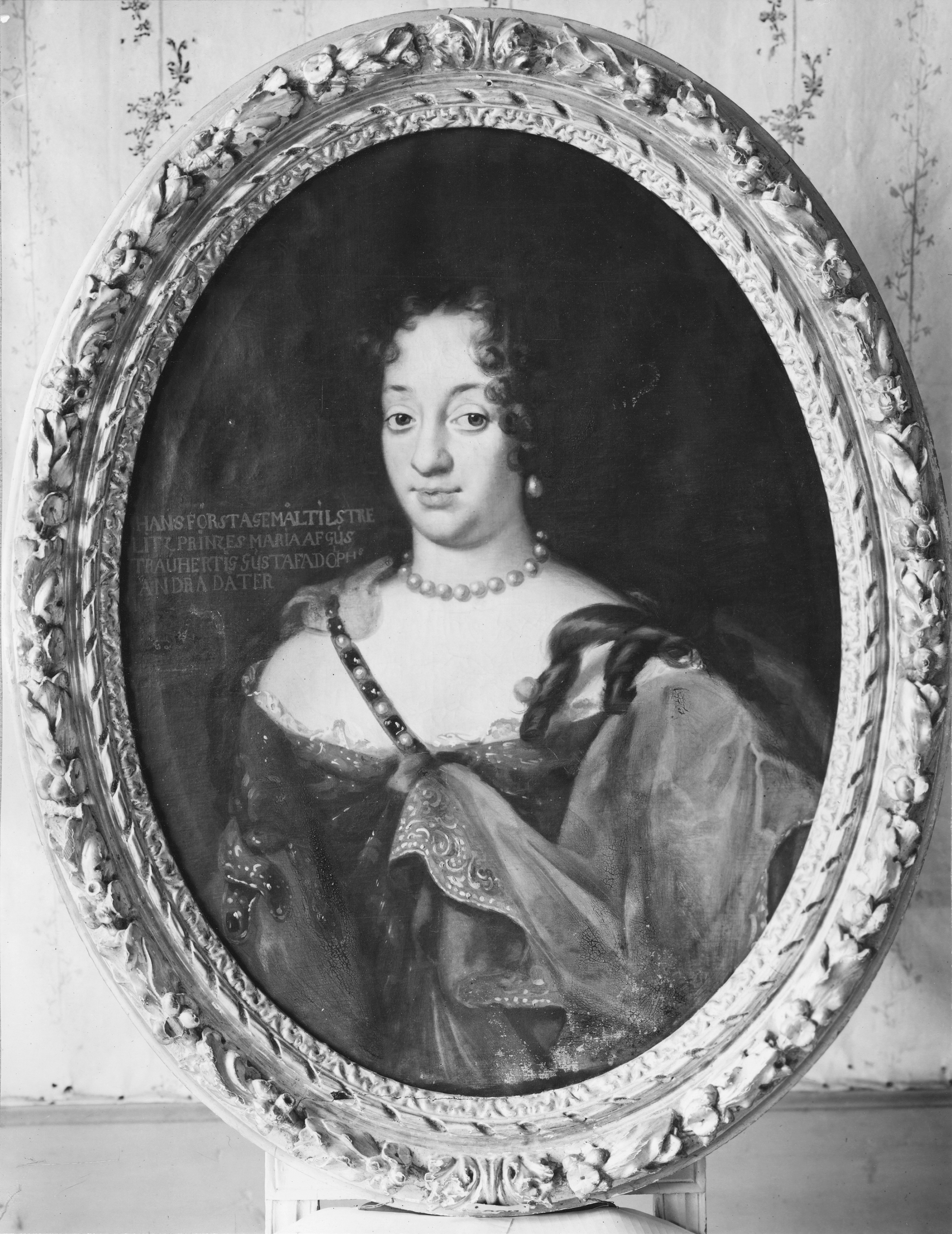
Marie of Mecklenburg-Güstrow

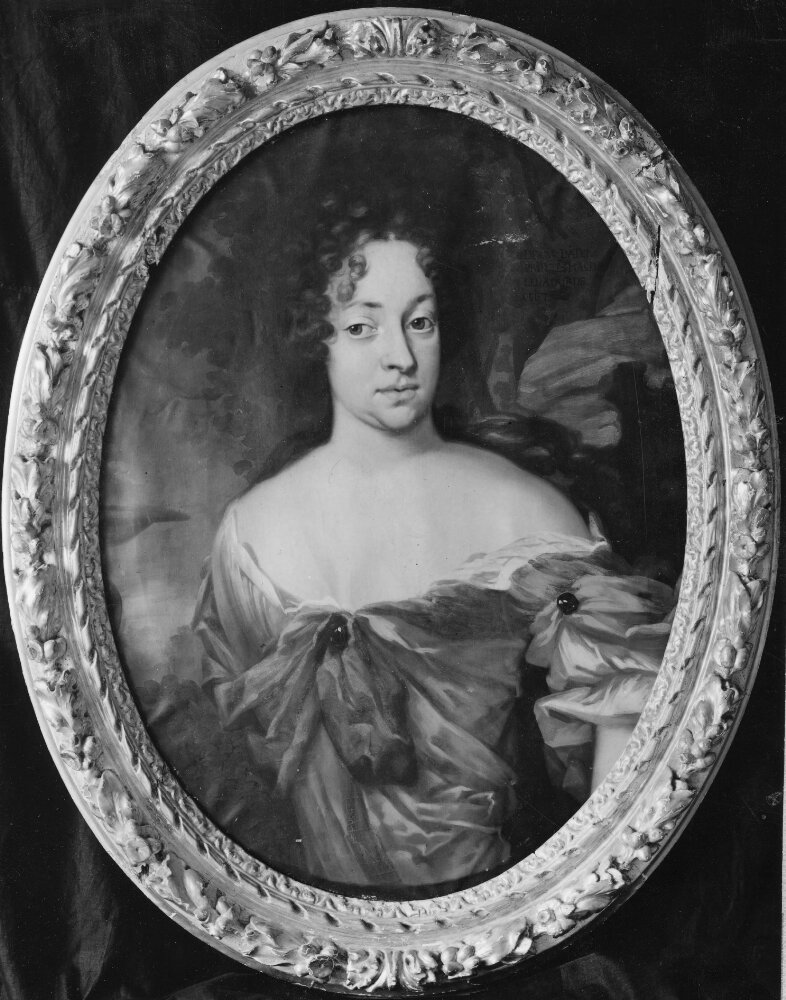
Magdalene of Mecklenburg-Güstrow

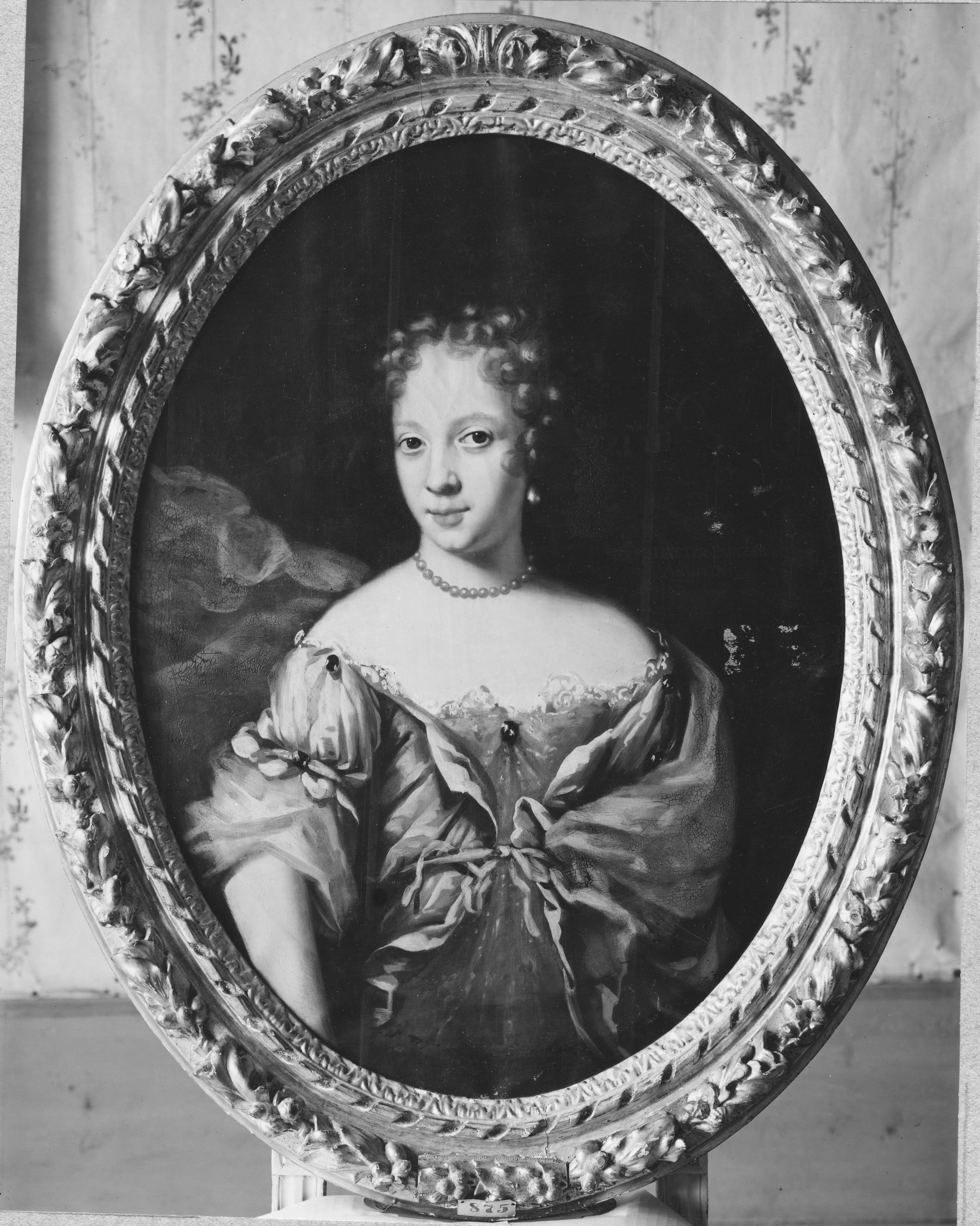
Augusta of Mecklenburg-Güstrow

== Widowhood ==
After her husband's death, she remained a widow for 26 years. She retained a small court in Güstrow. However, after the Mecklenburg-Güstrow line of dukes died out, the court in Güstrow lost its former glory and significance.

== Ancestry ==
Ancestors of Magdalena Sibylla of Holstein-Gottorp

8. Adolf, Duke of Holstein-Gottorp
4. John Adolph, Duke of Holstein-Gottorp
9. Christine of Hesse
2. Frederick III, Duke of Holstein-Gottorp
10. Frederick II of Denmark
5. Augusta of Denmark
11. Sophie of Mecklenburg-Güstrow
1. Magdalene Sibylle of Holstein-Gottorp
12. Christian I, Elector of Saxony
6. John George I, Elector of Saxony
13. Sophie of Brandenburg
3. Duchess Marie Elisabeth of Saxony
14. Albert Frederick, Duke of Prussia
7. Duchess Magdalene Sibylle of Prussia
15. Marie Eleonore of Cleves
