= Christiana of Schleswig-Holstein-Sonderburg-Glücksburg =

Duchess of Saxe-Merseburg (1634–1701)

Princess Christiana
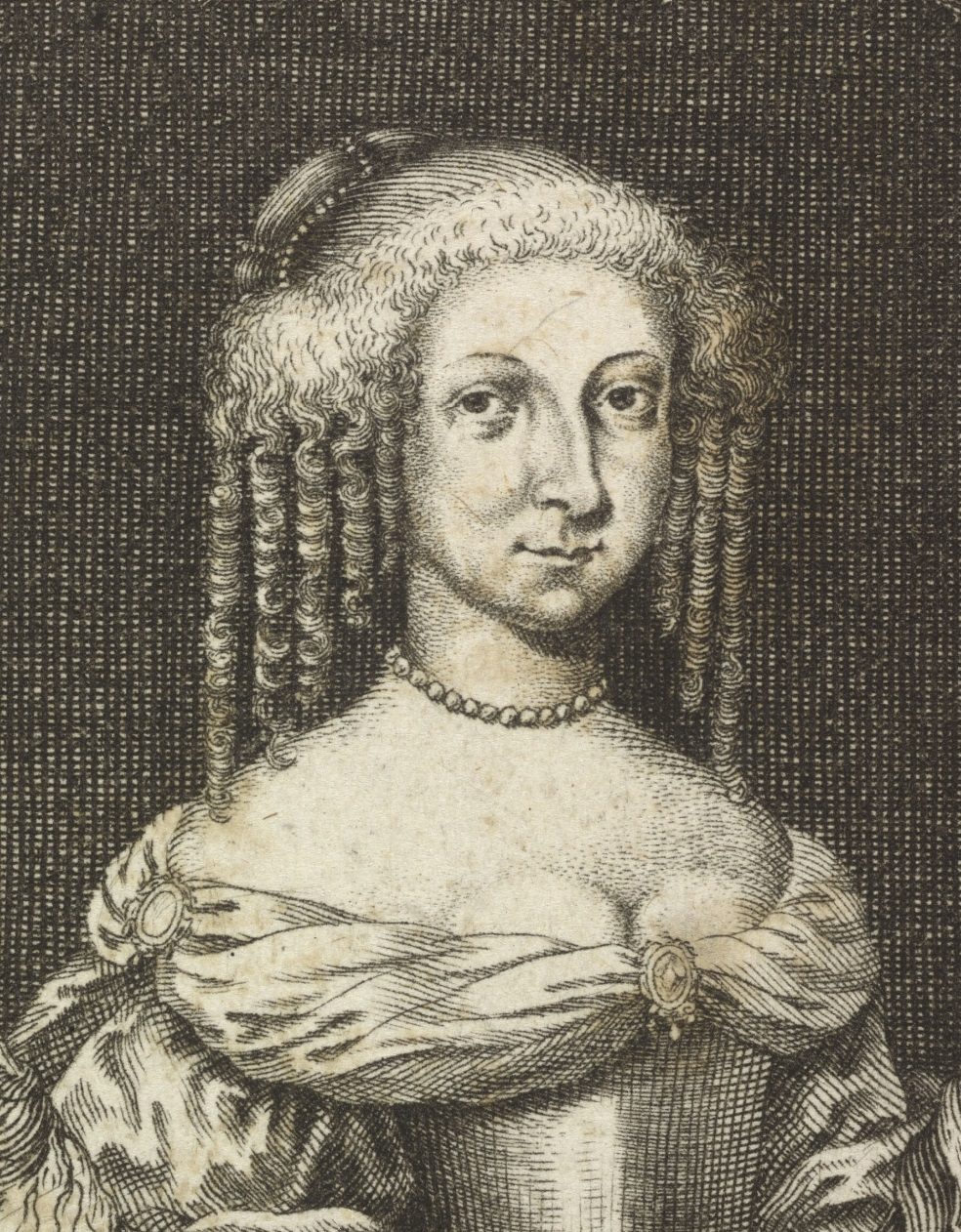
- Born: 22 September 1634; Copenhagen, Denmark
- Died: 20 May 1701 (aged 66); Delitzsch Castle
- Noble family: House of Schleswig-Holstein-Sonderburg-Glücksburg (by birth); House of Saxe-Merseburg (by marriage)
- Spouse: Christian I, Duke of Saxe-Merseburg
- Issue: Magdalene Sophie; Johann Georg; Christian II, Duke of Saxe-Merseburg; August, Duke of Saxe-Merseburg-Zörbig; Philipp, Duke of Saxe-Merseburg-Lauchstädt; Christiane, Duchess of Saxe-Eisenberg; Sophie Hedwig, Duchess of Saxe-Saalfeld; Heinrich, Duke of Saxe-Merseburg; Maurice; Sibylle Maria, Duchess of Württemberg-Oels
- Father: Philip, Duke of Schleswig-Holstein-Sonderburg-Glücksburg
- Mother: Sophie Hedwig of Saxe-Lauenburg

Princess Christiana of Schleswig-Holstein-Sonderburg-Glücksburg, often referred to as Christiane (22 September 1634 in Copenhagen – 20 May 1701 at Delitzsch Castle) was the consort of Christian I, Duke of Saxe-Merseburg, who was the ruling Duke of Saxe-Merseburg from 1650 until his death.

== Life ==
Christiana was the fourth daughter, and the ninth of 15 children, of Philip, Duke of Schleswig-Holstein-Sonderburg-Glücksburg and his wife, Sophie Hedwig of Saxe-Lauenburg. Christiana was born in Copenhagen, Denmark. She was raised by Magdalene Sibylle of Saxony, the widow of the Danish Crown Prince, at her widow seat Nyköpingshus.

On 19 November 1650, at the age of 16, Christiana married at Dresden Castle to Christian I, Duke of Saxe-Merseburg, the third son of Prince-Elector John George I of Saxony and his second wife, Duchess Magdalene Sibylle of Prussia. This was part of a double wedding: Christiana's elder sister Sophie Hedwig married Christian's younger brother Maurice. The double wedding was followed by four weeks of celebrations, including ballet and other performances, tournaments, parades and fireworks.

After her husband died in 1691, Christiana retreated to her widow seat, Delitzsch Castle, which she had received in 1688, replacing the earlier jointure Sangerhausen Castle. Delitzsch Castle had been renovated and remodeled to serve as her residence. However, the renovated had not been completed when she moved in on 31 May 1692. During her time at Delitsch, Christiana added a French formal garden to the castle.

== Marriage and issue ==
Christian and Christiana had eleven children:

- Magdalene Sophie (19 October 1651 in Dresden – 29 March 1675 in Merseburg)
- John George (4 December 1652 in Merseburg – 3 January 1654 in Merseburg)
- Christian II, Duke of Saxe-Merseburg (19 November 1653 in Merseburg – 20 October 1694 in Merseburg), inherited Merseburg.
- August (15 February 1655 in Merseburg, – 27 March 1715 in Zörbig), inherited Zörbig.
- Stillborn son (1 February 1656 in Merseburg)
- Philip (26 October 1657 in Merseburg – killed in action on 1 July 1690 at Fleurus); inherited Lauchstädt.
- Christiane (1 June 1659 Merseburg – 13 March 1679 in Eisenberg), married on 13 February 1677 to Christian, Duke of Saxe-Eisenberg.
- Sophie Hedwig (4 August 1660 in Merseburg – 2 August 1686 in Saalfeld), married on 18 February 1680 to Johann Ernst, Duke of Saxe-Saalfeld.
- Heinrich, Duke of Saxe-Merseburg (2 September 1661 in Merseburg – 28 July 1738 in Doberlug), inherited Spremberg; later (1731) also inherited Merseburg.
- Maurice (29 October 1662 in Merseburg – 21 April 1664 in Merseburg)
- Sibylle Maria (28 October 1667 in Merseburg – 9 October 1693 in Bernstadt); married on 27 October 1683 to Christian Ulrich I, Duke of Württemberg-Oels.

== Bibliography ==
- Ute Essegern: Fürstinnen am kursächsischen Hof. Lebenskonzepte und Lebensläufe zwischen Familie, Hof und Politik in der ersten Hälfte des 17. Jahrhunderts, in the series Schriften zur sächsischen Geschichte und Volkskunde, vol. 19, Leipziger Universitätsverlag, Leipzig, 2007, ISBN 978-3-86583-074-6, p. 383–385 (Abstract online)
- Uta Deppe: Die Festkultur am Dresdner Hofe Johann Georgs II. von Sachsen (1660–1679), in the series Bau + Kunst. Schleswig-Holsteinische Schriften zur Kunstgeschichte, vol. 13, Ludwig, Kiel, 2006, ISBN 3-933598-94-X, p. 14 (Online).
