= Fredericka Charlotte of Stolberg-Gedern =

German noblewoman (1686–1739)

- Born: 3 April 1686; Gedern, Hesse
- Died: 10 January 1739 (aged 52); Laubach, Hesse
- Spouses: Frederick Ernest, Count of Solms-Laubach
- Father: Louis Christian, Count of Stolberg-Gedern
- Mother: Christine of Mecklenburg-Güstrow

Friederike Charlotte of Stolberg-Gedern (3 April 1686 - 10 January 1739) was a German noblewoman of the House of Stolberg and by marriage a Countess of Solms-Laubach.

== Early life and marriage ==
Born Friederike Charlotte on April 3, 1686, in Gedern, Hesse, she was the third of the twenty-three children of Count Louis Christian of Stolberg-Gedern (1652 -1710) and Christine of Mecklenburg-Güstrow (1663-1749). Her elder siblings, twins Gustav Adolph and an unnamed sister, had died previously on January 17, 1684.

Friedrike was twenty-three years old when she married Friedrich Ernst, Count of Solms-Laubach on December 8, 1709, in Gedern. Friedrich Ernst was the president of the Reichskammergerichts and was succeeded by his surviving sons, Friedrich Magnus II and Christian August. Together they had thirteen children of which only three would survive into adulthood:

Name	Lifespan	Notes
Friederike Ernestine zu Solms-Laubach	1710-1711	Died in infancy.
Friedrich Magnus II zu Solms-Laubach	21 November 1711 - 17 August 1738	President of the Imperial Chamber Court in Wetzlar. Never married and had no issue.
Karl Leopold zu Solms-Laubach	1713-1713	Died in infancy.
Christian August zu Solms-Laubach	1714-1784	President of the Imperial Chamber Court in Wetzlar. Married Elisabeth Amalie Friederike of Isenburg-Büdingen; had issue.
Adolf Heinrich zu Solms-Laubach	1715-1715	Died in infancy.
Ludwig Karl zu Solms-Laubach	1716-1716	Died in infancy.
Magdalene Christine zu Solms-Laubach	1717-1719	Died in early childhood.
Ferdinand Otto zu Solms-Laubach	1718-1719	Died in infancy.
Luise Charlotte zu Solms-Laubach	1720-1723	Died in early childhood.
Marie Sophie Wilhelmine zu Solms-Laubach	1721-1793	Married Charles Christian Erdmann, Duke of Württemberg-Oels; had issue.
Johan Kuno zu Solms-Laubach	1722-1722	Twin of Karl Franz; died in infancy.
Karl Franz zu Solms-Laubach	1722-1722	Twin of Johan Kuno; died in infancy.
Karl Heinrich	1723-1723	Died in infancy.

== Death ==
Friederike was only 53 years old when she died on January 10, 1739, at SchloÏ Solms, Laubach, Hesse. She was buried in the local Evangelical church.
