= Princess Dorothea Wilhelmine of Saxe-Zeitz =

Princess William of Hesse-Kassel (1691–1743)

Dorothea Wilhelmine
- Princess William of Hesse-Kassel
- Born: 20 March 1691; Bad Elster
- Died: 17 March 1743 (aged 51); Kassel
- Spouse: Prince William of Hesse-Kassel (m. 1717)
- Issue: Prince Charles; Frederick II, Landgrave of Hesse-Kassel; Princess Maria Amalia
- House: Wettin
- Father: Maurice William, Duke of Saxe-Zeitz
- Mother: Marie Amalie of Brandenburg

Duchess Dorothea Wilhelmine of Saxe-Zeitz (20 March 1691 – 17 March 1743) was a duchess of Saxe-Zeitz by birth and by marriage Landgravine of Hesse-Kassel.

== Life ==
Dorothea Wilhelmine was a daughter of the Duke Maurice William of Saxe-Zeitz from his marriage to Princess Marie Amalie of Brandenburg, daughter of the Elector Frederick William I of Brandenburg. By 1710 all her siblings had died and so, after her father's death Dorothea Wilhelmine was the last surviving member of the house of Saxe-Zeitz.

She married on 27 September 1717 in Zeitz with future Landgrave William VIII of Hesse-Kassel. Queen Caroline of Great Britain reported to the Duchess of Orleans, the Landgravine "was ugly and had a weird head".

Dorothea Wilhelmine became mentally ill and no longer appeared in public after 1725. The new first lady at court was the Landgrave's favorite Barbara Christine von Bernhold whom he made Countess Bernold of Eschau while Dorothea Wilhelmine was still alive.

== Issue ==
From their marriage, Dorothea Wilhelmine had the following children:

- Charles (1718–1719)
- Frederick II (1720–1785), Landgrave of Hesse-Kassel

married 1740 Princess Mary of Great Britain (1723–1772)

- Maria Amalia (1721–1744), she died while engaged to be married with Margrave Charles Frederick Albert of Brandenburg-Schwedt
