= Christian I of Saxe-Merseburg =

Christian I
- Duke of Saxe-Merseburg
- Reign: 1657 – 1691
- Successor: Christian II
- Born: 27 October 1615; Dresden
- Died: 18 October 1691 (aged 75); Merseburg
- Spouse: Christiana of Schleswig-Holstein-Sonderburg-Glücksburg
- House: Wettin

Christian I of Saxe-Merseburg (27 October 1615 – 18 October 1691), was the first duke of Saxe-Merseburg and a member of the House of Wettin.

He was the sixth (third surviving) son of Johann Georg I, Elector of Saxony, and his second wife Magdalene Sibylle of Prussia.

== Life ==
As a younger son, Christian had little prospect of inheriting the Electorate of Saxony, and instead received from his father in 1650 the administration of the former Bishopric of Merseburg, which had been confiscated after the Reformation. He was also elected by the Chapter of the cathedral.

In a testament signed on 20 July 1652, the Elector John George I settled on an official division of the Albertine lands. Christian moved to Merseburg with his wife and children on 30 September 1653 and set up a household of his own. His court soon encompassed 150 people.

Christian took formal possession of his lands on 22 April 1657, a few months after the funeral of his father on 27 January 1657. According to the will of John George I, Christian received Merseburg and the cities of Bad Lauchstädt, Schkeuditz, Lützen, and Zwenkauand with their castles, half of the towns of Brehna, Zörbig, and Finsterwalde, and the Margraviate of Lower Lusatia, including the towns and castles of Lübben, Dobrilugk, Finsterwalde, Guben, Luckau, Calau, and Spremberg; this settlement created the Duchy of Saxe-Merseburg with Christian as its ruler.

When the House of Biberstein became extinct on 9 January 1668, Christian became ruler of Forst, with all its castles and vassal villages, including Döbern in the Electorate of Saxony, which created new disputes with his brother, John George II, its ruler. On 11 August a formal division of the new territories was settled on. By this agreement, the towns of Delitzsch and Bitterfeld (which Christian received in 1660), plus Zörbig, were returned to the Electorate of Saxony. Nonetheless, Zörbig was given back to Christian in 1681.

On 25 November 1659, Christian gave Count Erdmann Leopold of Promnitz his approval to permit some Protestant refugees from Silesia, mainly from the duchies of Sagan and Glogau, to live quietly in Neudorf. In his honor, they renamed the village Christiansdorf (now known as Krzystkowice).

Christian's older brother, John George II, found himself frustrated by his late father's will, since it divided the lands of the Electorate contrary to the principle of primogeniture. He tried to retrieve the lands of his brothers (including Christian), because he feared that the unity of the Electorate was in danger; finally, after several discussions, Christian and his younger brothers reluctantly accepted the overlordship of the Elector. However, the Elector John George III, son of John George II, tried again to retrieve the appanages of his uncles and cousins by annulling prior agreements upon his accession in 1680. For the rest of his reign, Christian was perpetually threatened with open conflict with his nephew the Elector.

In 1655 Christian I was accepted into the Fruitbearing Society.

== Marriage and issue ==
In Dresden on 19 November 1650, Christian married Christiana, a daughter of Philip, Duke of Schleswig-Holstein-Sonderburg-Glücksburg in a double marriage in which his brother Maurice married Christiana's sister Sophie Hedwig. Christian and Christiana had eleven children:

- Magdalene Sophie (b. Dresden, 19 October 1651 – d. Merseburg, 29 March 1675) died unmarried and without issue.
- Johann Georg (b. Merseburg, 4 December 1652 – d. Merseburg, 3 January 1654) died in early childhood.
- Christian II, Duke of Saxe-Merseburg (b. Merseburg, 19 November 1653 – d. Merseburg, 20 October 1694).
- August (b. Merseburg, 15 February 1655 – d. Zörbig, 27 March 1715), inherited Zörbig.
- Stillborn son (Merseburg, 1 February 1656).
- Philipp (b. Merseburg, 26 October 1657 – killed in action at Fleurus, 1 July 1690), inherited Lauchstädt.
- Christiane (b. Merseburg, 1 June 1659 – d. Eisenberg, 13 March 1679), married on 13 February 1677 to Christian, Duke of Saxe-Eisenberg.
- Sophie Hedwig (b. Merseburg, 4 August 1660 – d. Saalfeld, 2 August 1686), married on 18 February 1680 to Johann Ernst, Duke of Saxe-Saalfeld.
- Heinrich (b. Merseburg, 2 September 1661 – d. Doberlug, 28 July 1738), inherited Spremberg; later (1731) also inherited Merseburg.
- Maurice (b. Merseburg, 29 October 1662 – d. Merseburg, 21 April 1664) died in early childhood.
- Sibylle Maria (b. Merseburg, 28 October 1667 – d. Bernstadt, 9 October 1693), married on 27 October 1683 to Christian Ulrich I, Duke of Württemberg-Oels.

Christian I of Saxe-Merseburg House of Wettin Born: 27 October 1615 Died: 18 October 1691
Preceded by new creation	Duke of Saxe-Merseburg; 1657–1691	Succeeded by Christian II
