= Marie Amalie of Brandenburg =

Duchess of Saxe-Zeitz (1670–1739)

Maria Amalia of Brandenburg-Schwedt
- Hereditary Princess of Mecklenburg-Güstrow
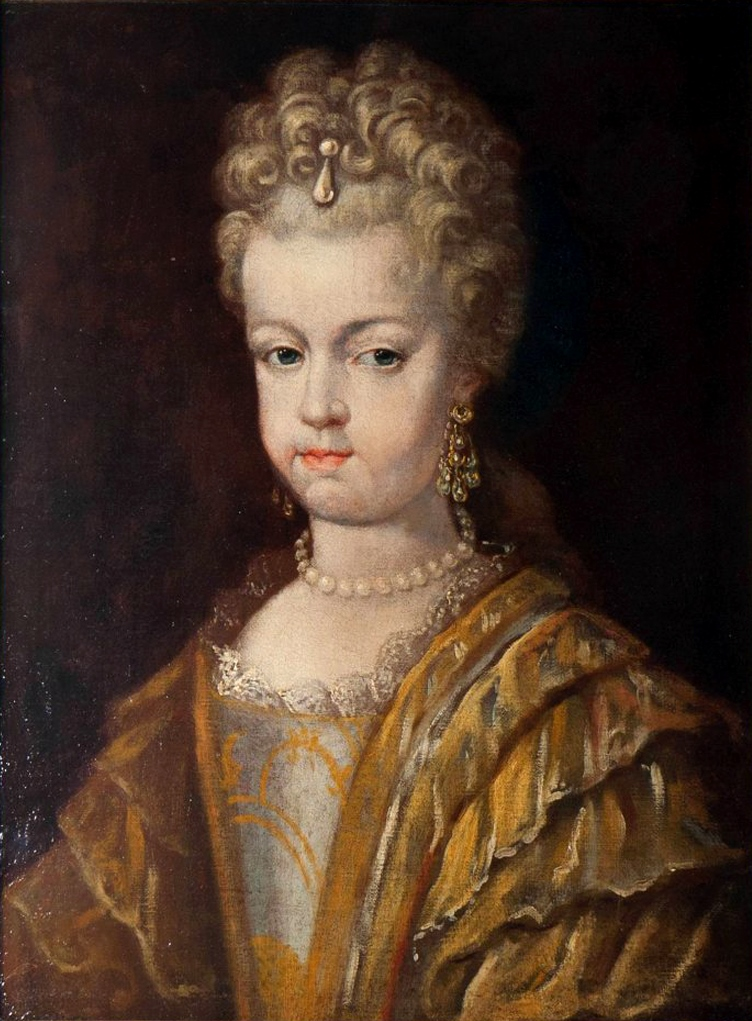

Duchess consort of Saxe-Zeitz
- Tenure: 25 June 1689 – 15 November 1718
- Born: 26 November 1670; Cölln
- Died: 17 November 1739 (aged 68); Bertholdsburg Castle in Schleusingen
- Burial: Martinskirche, Kassel
- Spouse: Charles of Mecklenburg-Güstrow (m. 1687; died 1688) Maurice William of Saxe-Zeitz (m. 1689; died 1718)
- Issue Detail: Dorothea Wilhelmine of Saxe-Zeitz
- House: Hohenzollern
- Father: Frederick William, Elector of Brandenburg
- Mother: Sophia Dorothea of Schleswig-Holstein-Sonderburg-Glücksburg

Maria Amalia of Brandenburg-Schwedt (26 November 1670 – 17 November 1739) was a princess from the Brandenburg-Schwedt line of the House of Hohenzollern and by marriage a Duchess of Saxe-Zeitz.

== Family ==
She was the daughter of the "Great Elector" Frederick William of Brandenburg from his second marriage with Sophia Dorothea of Schleswig-Holstein-Sonderburg-Glücksburg, daughter of Duke Philip of Schleswig-Holstein-Sonderburg-Glücksburg.

== Life ==
In 1709, while she was a duchess, she visited the William Fountain, a medicinal spring in Schleusingen. She promoted the development of Schleusingen as a spa.

She died in 1739, at the age of 68, at the castle in Schleusingen that had earlier served as the seat of the Counts of Henneberg-Schleusingen. She had received this castle as her widow seat. Via her daughter, she was related to the Landgraviate family in Hesse and on that basis, she was buried in the royal crypt in the Martinskirche, Kassel.

== Marriage and issue ==
Her first marriage was on 20 August 1687 in Potsdam with Prince Charles of Mecklenburg-Güstrow, the son of the Duke Gustav Adolph of Mecklenburg-Güstrow and Magdalene Sibylle of Holstein-Gottorp. Their only child was born on 15 March 1688 and died later that day. Her husband also died that day.

She married her second husband on 25 June 1689 in Potsdam. He was Duke Maurice William of Saxe-Zeitz, the son of Duke Maurice of Saxe-Zeitz and Dorothea Maria of Saxe-Weimar. She survived him by 21 years. They had the following children:

1. Frederick William (Moritzburg, 26 March 1690 – Moritzburg, 15 May 1690).
2. Dorothea Wilhelmine (Moritzburg, 20 March 1691 – Kassel, 17 March 1743), married on 27 September 1717 to Landgrave William VIII of Hesse-Kassel.
3. Karoline Amalie (Moritzburg, 24 May 1693 – Moritzburg, 5 September 1694).
4. Sophia Charlotte (Moritzburg, 25 April 1695 – Moritzburg, 18 June 1696).
5. Frederick Augustus (Moritzburg, 12 August 1700 – Halle, 17 February 1710).
