= Heinrich, Duke of Saxe-Merseburg =

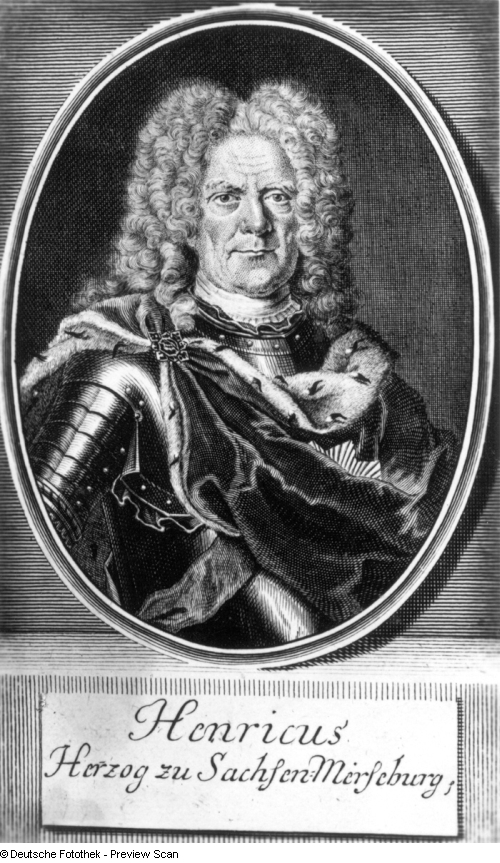
Heinrich, Duke of Saxe-Merseburg.

Heinrich, Duke of Saxe-Merseburg (Merseburg, 2 September 1661 – Doberlug, 28 July 1738), was a duke of Saxe-Merseburg and member of the House of Wettin.

He was the sixth (but fourth surviving) son of Christian I, Duke of Saxe-Merseburg and Christiana of Schleswig-Holstein-Sonderburg-Glücksburg.

== Life ==
In order to give his three younger sons lands to generate income for their support, Duke Christian I assigned to each of them small territories as appanages before he died. Their administration remained under the control of the Saxe-Merseburg main line, however, and they were only able to exercise limited powers over their territories. In 1694 Heinrich received the town of Spremberg and founded the line of Saxe-Merseburg-Spremberg.

Heinrich's rule in Spremberg led to an exceptional period of artistic patronage when he had Schloss Spremberg expanded to serve as his summer residence. Two magnificent three-story wings were built in the east and west connected by a wooden gallery on the courtside whose tower was provided with a tent roof.

He also established a pleasure park where he could indulge his love for the hunt. His notorious preference for hunting was later immortalized in a part of Spremberg that is named after him: "Heinrichsfeld."

The city was rebuilt with Heinrich's support after the big fire of 30 July 1705. For the craftsmen, he bestowed privileges which led to the blossoming of their trade. Heinrich is also regarded as a major patron of the arts. He appointed Johann Theodor Roemhildt in 1726 as his "Hofkapellmeister" (head of the court musical establishment) a post he also held later in Merseburg. From the sculptor Johann Michael Hoppenhaupt he ordered a Medaillenkabinett on his own design which represents today the single piece of original furniture in the museum in the Schloss Merseburg.

The death of his young nephew Frederick Erdmann in 1714 left Heinrich as the next in line to succeed to the duchy of Saxe-Merseburg. After Heinrich's nephew Maurice Wilhelm died without male issue on 21 April 1731, the sixty-nine-year-old Heinrich inherited the duchy.

He continued to foster economic and artistic activities on the model of his late nephew. In 1735 he initiated the building of a duke's pavilion in Lauchstädt and in 1738 he had built the so-called High Water Art (German: Oberen Wasserkunst), a well-house and commercial house in Merseburg-Oberaltenburg. His sculptor and architect Johann Michael Hoppenhaupt was responsible for the designs.

== Marriage and issue ==
In Güstrow on 29 March 1692 Heinrich married Elisabeth of Mecklenburg-Güstrow, sister of Hedwig, the wife of Heinrich's brother August, Duke of Saxe-Merseburg-Zörbig. They had three children:

1. Maurice, Hereditary Prince of Saxe-Spremberg (b. Spremberg, 29 October 1694 – d. Spremberg, 11 April 1695) died in infancy.
2. Christiana Fredericka (b. Spremberg, 17 May 1697 – d. Spremberg, 21 August 1722) died unmarried and without issue.
3. Gustava Magdalena (b. Spremberg, 2 October 1699 – d. Spremberg, 3 October 1699) died in infancy.

Without surviving male issue, the line of Saxe-Merseburg became extinct upon his death.

Heinrich, Duke of Saxe-Merseburg House of Wettin Born: 2 September 1661 Died: 28 July 1738
Preceded by Maurice Wilhelm	Duke of Saxe-Merseburg; 1731–1738	Succeeded by duchy reverted to the Electorate of Saxony
