= August, Duke of Saxe-Merseburg-Zörbig =

German prince (1655-1715)

August, Duke of Saxe-Merseburg-Zörbig (Merseburg, 15 February 1655 – Zörbig, 27 March 1715), was a German prince and member of the House of Wettin.

He was the third but second surviving son of Christian I, Duke of Saxe-Merseburg and Christiana of Schleswig-Holstein-Sonderburg-Glücksburg.

== Life ==
In order to provide his three younger sons with an income befitting their status, Duke Christian I, assigned to each of them before his death a small territory as appanage; however, these territories remained dependent on the senior Saxe-Merseburg line, and their sovereign powers were severely limited. August received the town of Zörbig in 1691 and founded the line of Saxe-Merseburg-Zörbig.

In consequence, August relocated his household from Alt-Stargard, which he had received from his father-in-law as a dowry, to Zörbig. His rule there caused the town to flourish in an exceptional manner. In particular, he continued the reconstruction measures started by his father in the region damaged by the Thirty Years' War.

In 1694 he ordered Castle Zörbig to be rebuilt into a new and comfortable residence; however, August died before the works were finished. After his death, the castle was assigned to his widow Hedwig and their only surviving daughter Caroline as their residence.

Duke August died on 27 March 1715 at the age of 60. His body was conveyed to Merseburg and entombed in an ostentatious coffin made from tin in the princely crypt of Merseburg Cathedral. Since he had no surviving male heir, the territory of Saxe-Merseburg-Zörbig was reunited with the duchy of Saxe-Merseburg, and his appanage returned to the Saxe-Merseburg line represented by his nephew Maurice Wilhelm who, however, passed it to August's widow as a life estate.

== Marriage and issue ==
On 1 December 1686 August married Hedwig of Mecklenburg-Güstrow in Güstrow. They had eight children:

1. Christiane Magdalene (b. Zörbig, 11 March 1687 – d. Merseburg, 21 March 1689) died in early childhood.
2. Stillborn daughter (Alt-Stargard, Mecklenburg, 30 December 1689).
3. Caroline Auguste (b. Zörbig, 10 March 1691 – d. Zörbig, 23 September 1743) died unmarried and without issue.
4. Hedwig Eleonore (b. Zörbig, 26 February 1693 – d. Zörbig, 31 August 1693) died in infancy.
5. Gustav Frederick, Hereditary Prince of Saxe-Merseburg-Zörbig (b. Zörbig, 28 October 1694 – d. Zörbig, 24 May 1695) died in infancy.
6. August, Hereditary Prince of Saxe-Merseburg-Zörbig (b. Zörbig, 26 February 1696 – d. Zörbig, 26 March 1696) died in infancy.
7. Stillborn twin sons (1707).
