= Saxe-Merseburg =

European polity

Duchy of Saxe-Merseburg Herzogtum Sachsen-Merseburg (German)
- 1657–1738
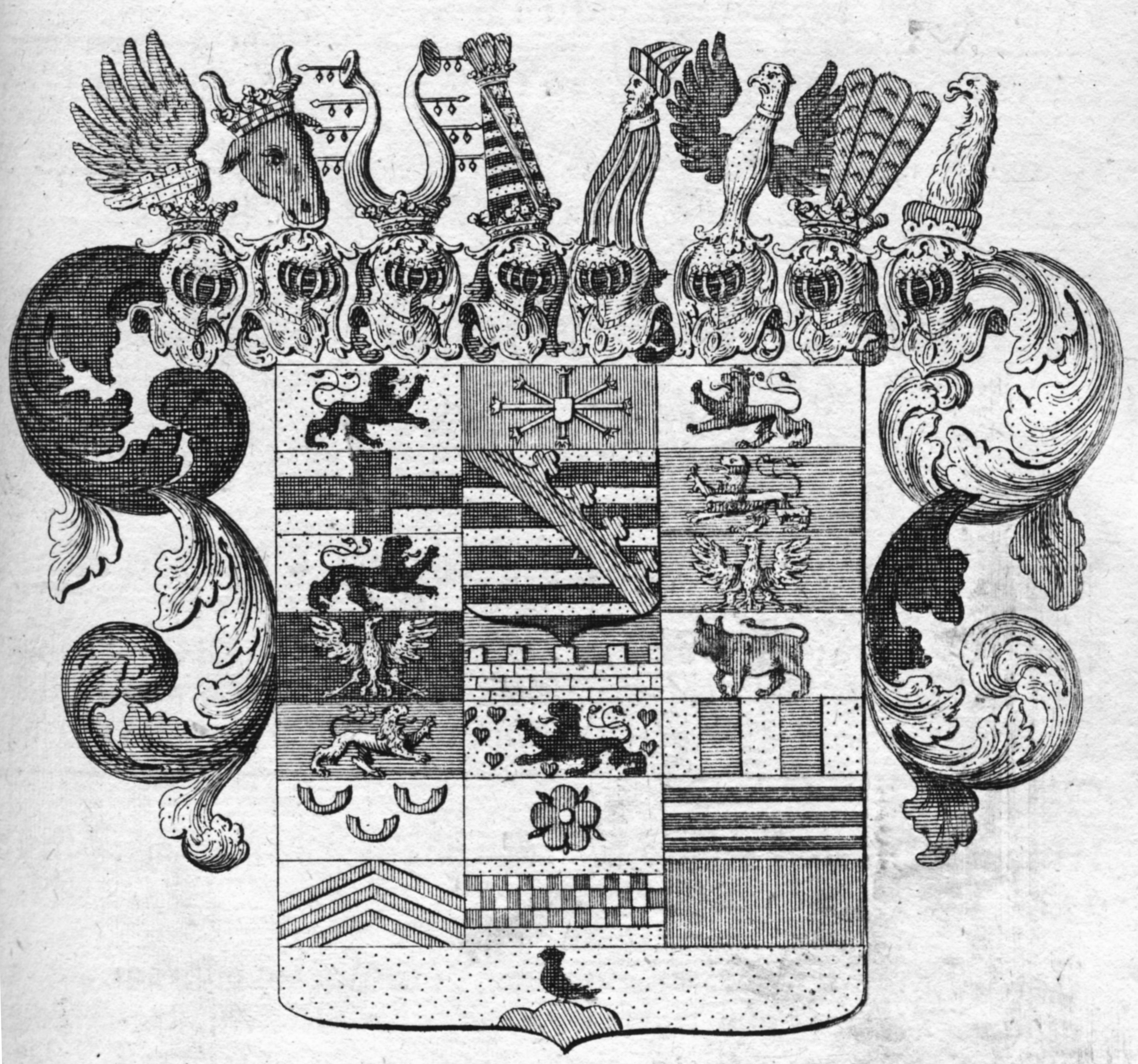
- Coat of arms
- Status: State of the Holy Roman Empire; Secundogeniture of Saxony
- Capital: Merseburg
- Government: Duchy
- Duke
  - 1657–1691: Christian I
  - 1691–1694: Christian II
  - 1694: Christian III Maurice
  - 1694–1731: Maurice Wilhelm
  - 1731–1738: Heinrich
- Historical era: Early modern Europe
  - Death of Elector John George I: 1656
  - Split off from Saxony: 1657
  - Fell back to Saxony: 1738
Preceded by	Succeeded by
Electorate of Saxony	Electorate of Saxony
- Today part of: Germany

The Duchy of Saxe-Merseburg was a duchy of the Holy Roman Empire, with Merseburg as its capital. It existed from 1656 or 1657 to 1738 and was owned by an Albertine secundogeniture of the Saxon House of Wettin.

== History ==
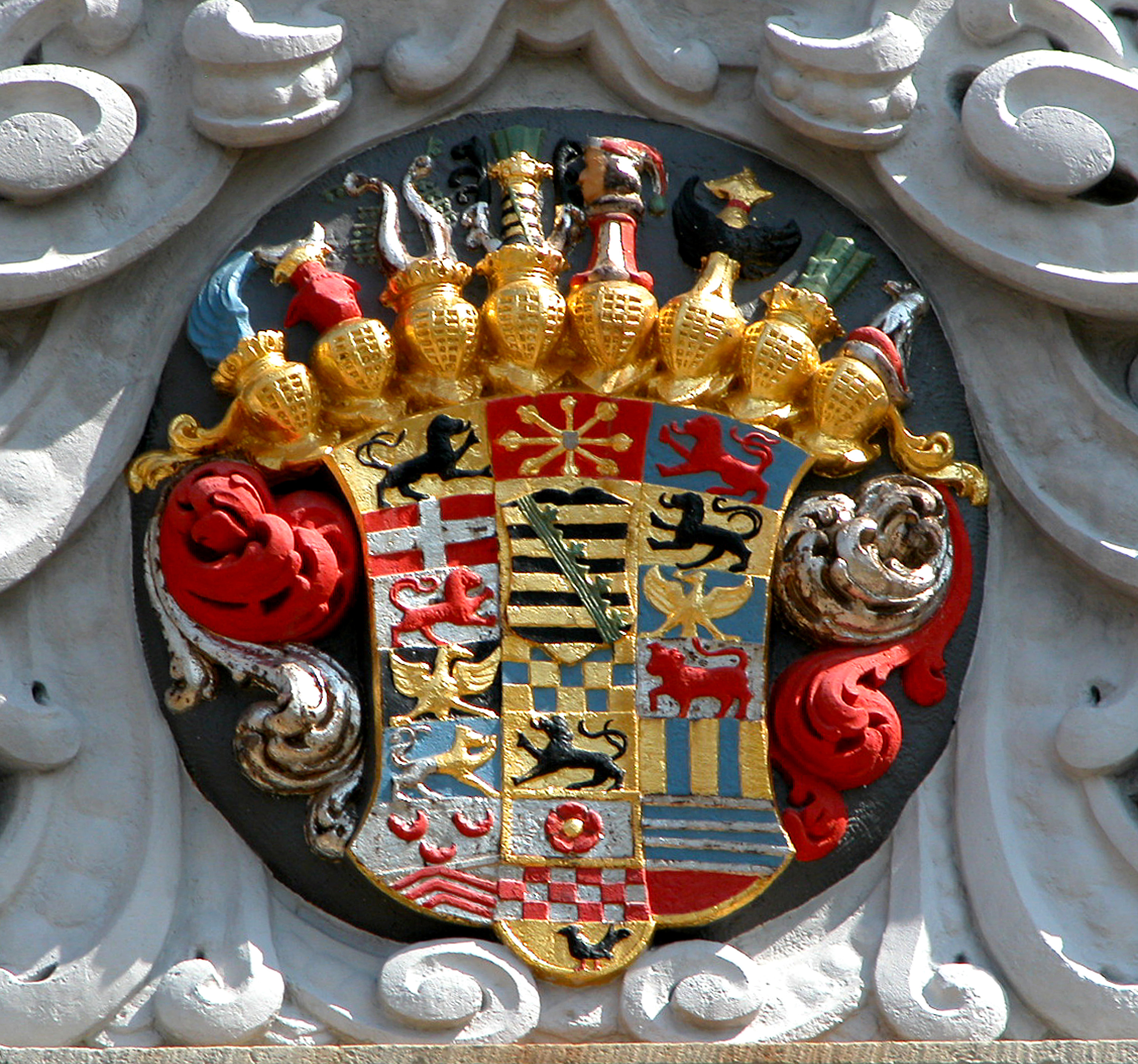
Coat of arms of the Duchy of Saxe-Merseburg, Doberlug castle, Doberlug-Kirchhain

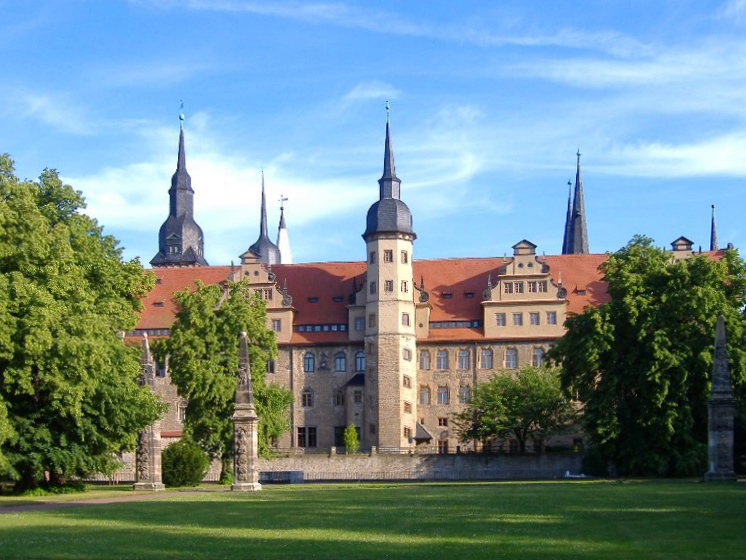
Merseburg Castle, Saxony-Anhalt

The Wettin Elector John George I of Saxony stipulated in his will dated 20 July 1652 that his three younger sons should receive secundogeniture principalities. After the elector died on 8 October 1656, his sons concluded the "friend-brotherly main treaty" in the Saxon residence of Dresden on 22 April 1657 and a further treaty in 1663 delineating their territories and sovereign rights definitively. The treaties created three duchies: Saxe-Zeitz, Saxe-Weissenfels, and Saxe-Merseburg.

Prince Christian, the third eldest son, received, among other properties, the estates of the former Bishopric of Merseburg, secularised in 1565: the castles, cities and districts of Merseburg, Plagwitz, Rückmarsdorf, Delitzsch (with Delitzsch Castle), Bad Lauchstädt, Schkeuditz, Lützen, Bitterfeld, Zörbig, the County of Brehna as well as the Margraviate of Lower Lusatia, including the cities and castles of Lübben, Doberlug, Finsterwalde, Döbern, Forst and Guben. Many of these territories had belonged to the Diocese of Merseburg until it was secularized in 1562.

The area of Saxe-Merseburg stretched to the western city limits of Leipzig. The customs station was in what is now the inner city district of Lindenau.

After the death of the last male heir of the Saxon branch line in 1738, the Duchy of Saxe-Merseburg fell back to the Electorate of Saxony.

== Rulers ==
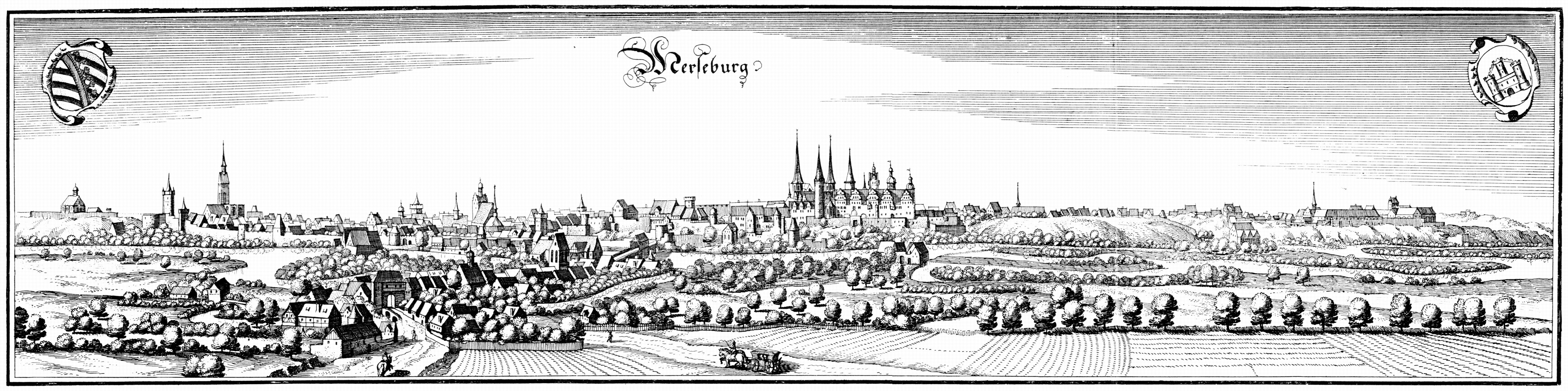
Merseburg in 1650.

- 1656-1691 Christian I (born: 27 October 1615 in Dresden; died: 18 October 1691 in Merseburg)
- 1691-1694 Christian II (born: 19 November 1653 in Merseburg; died: 20 October 1694 in Merseburg)
- 1694 Christian III Maurice (born: 7 November 1680 in Merseburg; died: 14 November 1694 in Merseburg), under the regency of Elector Frederick August I of Saxony and the guardianship of his mother Erdmuthe Dorothea of Saxe-Zeitz
- 1694-1731 Maurice Wilhelm (born: 5 February 1688 in Merseburg; died: 21 April 1731 in Merseburg), until 1712 under the regency of Elector Frederick August I of Saxony and the guardianship of his mother Erdmuthe Dorothea of Saxe-Zeitz
- 1731-1738 Heinrich (born: 2 September 1661 in Merseburg; died: 28 July 1738 in Doberlug), previously already Duke of Saxe-Merseburg-Spremberg

== Cadet lines ==
To supply his three younger sons with incomes befitting a duke, Duke Christian I created apanages for his younger sons during his lifetime. These territories remained dependent on the main line and their sovereignty was severely restricted. They were named after their owner's residences and disappeared with the death of their first duke, because none of them fathered surviving male heirs. Before it died out, the Saxe-Merseburg-Spremberg line inherited all of Saxe-Merseburg.

- Until 1715 August (born: 15 February 1655 in Merseburg; died: 27 March 1715 in Zörbig), Duke of Saxe-Merseburg-Zörbig
- Until 1690 Philipp (born: 26 October 1657 in Merseburg; died: 1 July 1690 in Fleurus), Duke of Saxe-Merseburg-Lauchstädt
- Until 1731 Heinrich (born: 2 September 1661 in Merseburg; died: 28 July 1738 in Doberlug), Duke of Saxe-Merseburg-Spremberg until 1731, inherited Saxe-Merseburg in 1731
