= Louise of Mecklenburg-Güstrow =

Queen of Denmark and Norway from 1699 to 1721

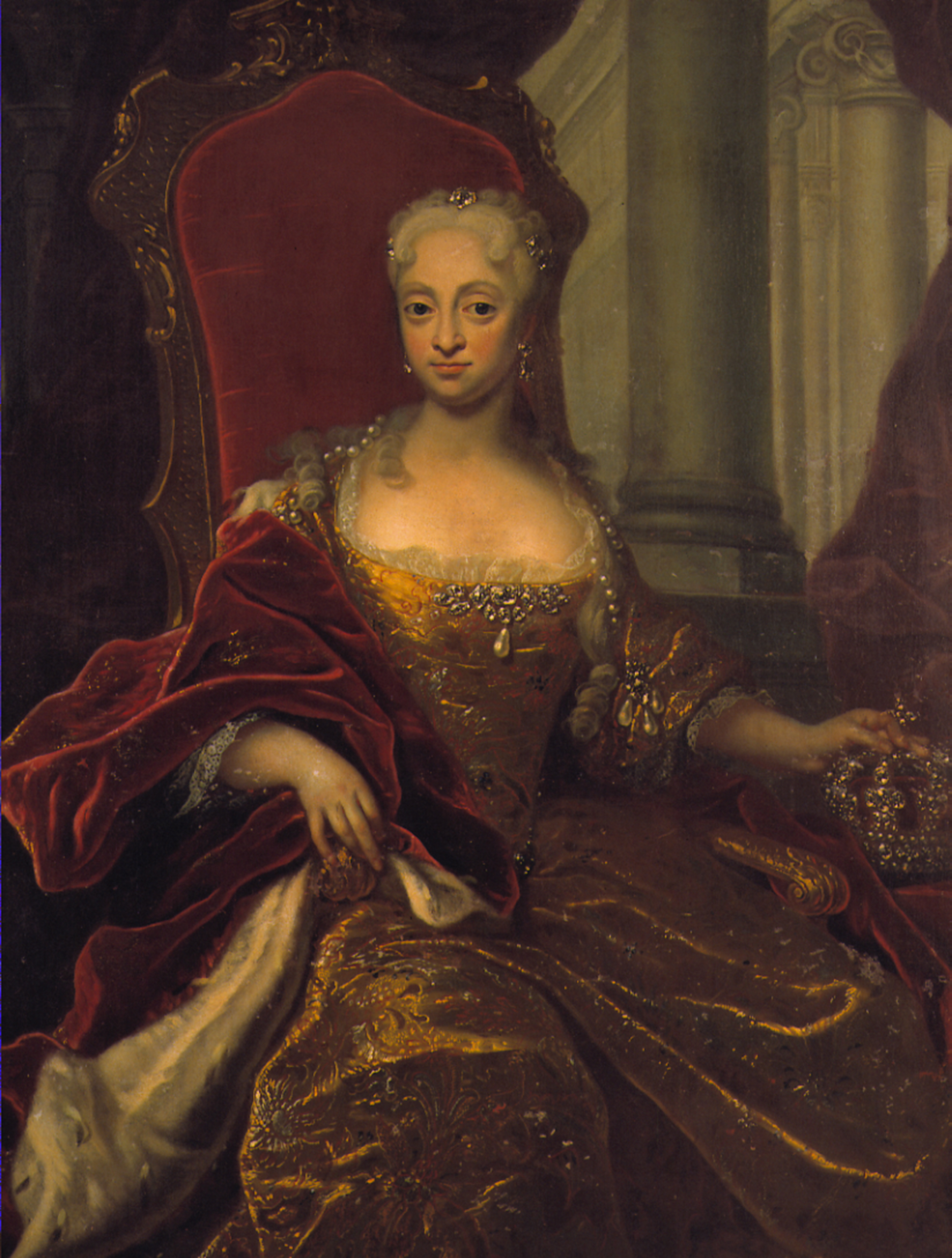
- Portrait by Johann Salomon Wahl, c. 1720

Queen consort of Denmark and Norway
- Tenure: 25 August 1699 – 15 March 1721
- Coronation: 15 April 1700
- Born: 28 August 1667; Güstrow
- Died: 15 March 1721 (aged 53); Copenhagen
- Burial: Roskilde Cathedral
- Spouse: Frederick IV of Denmark (m. 1695)
- Issue more...: Christian VI; Princess Charlotte Amalie
- House: Mecklenburg
- Father: Gustav Adolph, Duke of Mecklenburg-Güstrow
- Mother: Magdalene Sibylle of Holstein-Gottorp

Louise of Mecklenburg-Güstrow (28 August 1667 – 15 March 1721) was Queen of Denmark and Norway as the first wife of King Frederick IV of Denmark. In 1708–09, she was regent during her husband's trip to Italy.

== Early life ==
Louise was born in Güstrow on 28 August 1667 in the family of Duke Gustav Adolph of Mecklenburg-Güstrow and Duchess Magdalena Sibylla of Holstein-Gottorp as a great-great-granddaughter of Frederick II of Denmark. Louise grew up into a tiny court characterized by pietistic feelings and rigid religiosity, led by her father, who wrote religious songs in pietistic spirit.

In 1695, Louise was selected by Crown Prince Frederick as his bride. When it was deemed time for Frederick to marry and provide an heir to the throne, he was sent on a journey to Germany to choose a bride from some of the Protestant Princely houses. When he reached Güstrow, he chose Louise because of her beauty, and his choice was wholeheartedly accepted as suitable from both the Danish royal house as well as from her family. He reportedly also expected her to accept any potential adultery from his side without protests.

== Crown Princess ==
On 5 December 1695, Louise married Crown Prince Frederik in Güstrow followed by their formal entry in to Copenhagen. Initially, the marriage was described as happy; Louise reciprocated Frederick's attraction, and the French ambassador noted: "The crown princess loves her spouse intensely, and he lives with her in complete bliss". Only two of their five children survived to adulthood: King Christian VI of Denmark and Princess Charlotte Amalie of Denmark.

== Queen ==
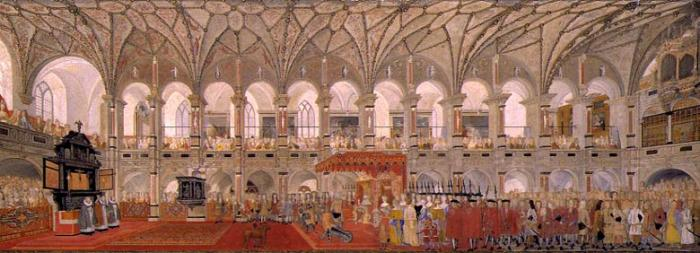
Anointing of Frederick IV and Queen Louise in the Chapel of Frederiksborg Palace by Bendix Grodtschilling the Youngest.

At the death of Christian V on 25 August 1699, the couple became King and Queen of Denmark and Norway. They were crowned on 15 April 1700 in the Chapel of Frederiksborg Palace. In parallel, Frederick's infatuation with Louise had passed, and he involved himself in a number of public affairs, notably with Elisabeth Helene von Vieregg (1699-1704), Charlotte Helene von Schindel (1704-11) and Anna Sophie Reventlow (1712–21). Frederick even entered two morganatic marriages; in 1703, he committed bigamy with his mistress Elisabeth Helene von Vieregg, and in 1712 with Anna Sophie Reventlow. The day after Queen Louise's funeral, Frederick IV married Anna Sophie Reventlow again, and less than two months later, he had her crowned.

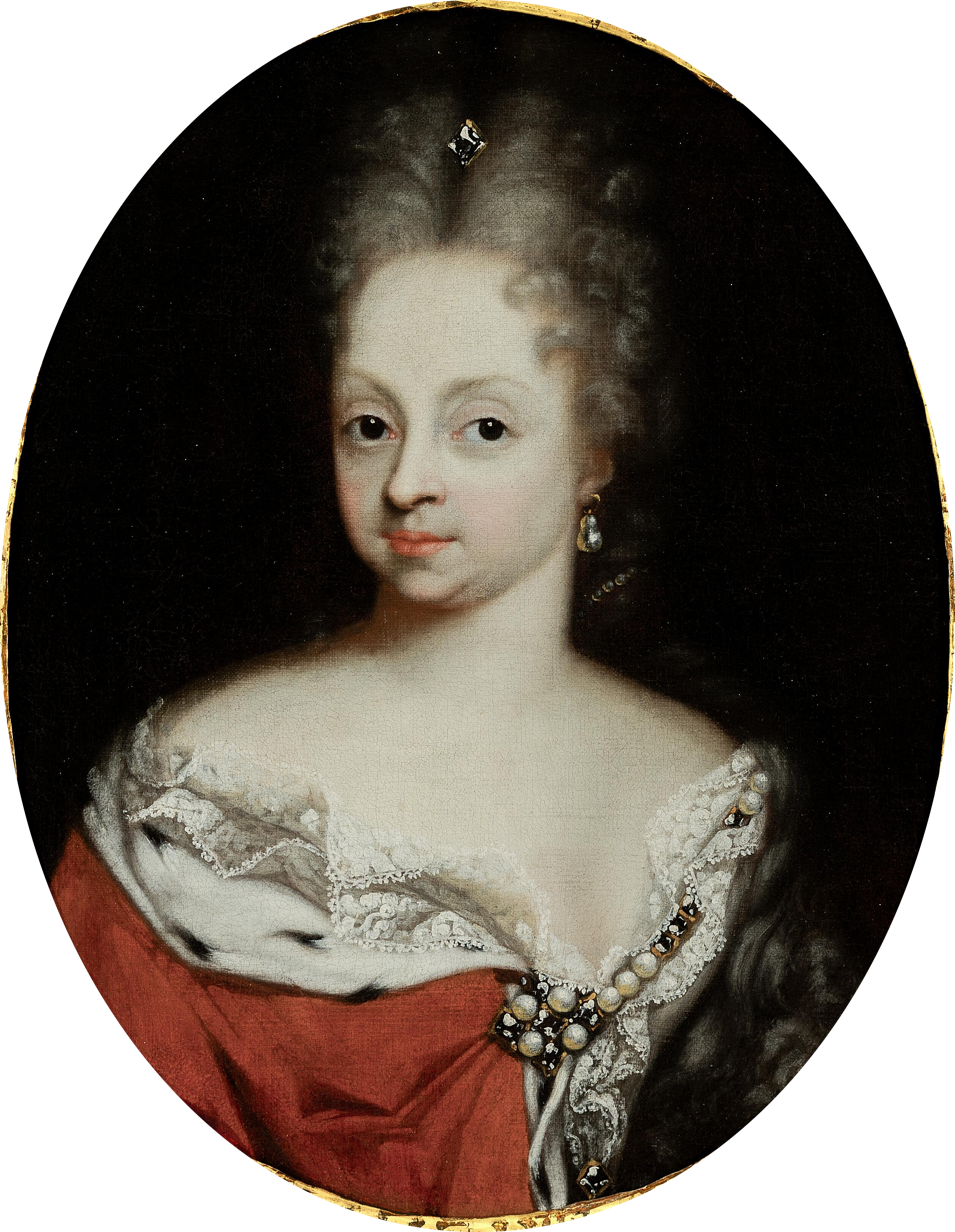
Portrait by Jacques d'Agar, c. 1700

Unlike Frederick IV, she never gained popularity with the population. Louise figured in her role as queen at official ceremonies, but was otherwise ignored at court, and her isolated and quiet life has made her less known in history. The official mistresses and wives by bigamy of the king were given their own titles, residences and courts, and their houses were frequented by the king and thereby by the nobility, while Queen Louise was ignored and deprived of her role as the female center in court life which her rank would otherwise have entitled her. Her social isolation became particularly severe after the king's second bigamy with Anna Sophie Reventlow in 1712, and during her last nine years her life was described as a shadow, while she only appeared at the king's side in official ceremonies where the presence of the queen was demanded by etiquette.

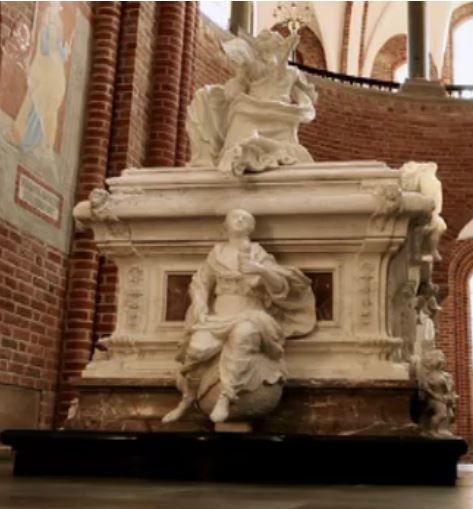
Louise's sarcophagus at Roskilde Cathedral.

Louise suffered because of her husband's infidelity. It is mentioned that she caused embarrassing scenes at court during Frederick's affairs and that she had a bad temperament. Her jealousy attracted great attention, and it was said that Frederick could not enter her rooms without Louise beginning to "cry, raise and walk about like a furie", which caused him to leave in anger, after which she "walked about for three or four hours, turning her hands and crying copiously."

Queen Louise was strongly influenced by Pietism, and she sought solace in religion. Her main interest was reading religious books. Her collection of 400 books, which was donated to the royal library after her death, was mainly composed of ascetic religious literature in German. After her death, her interest in religion was praised by the clergy, who compared her with the legendary Queen Esther and referred to her as a saint. Louise was close to her son Christian, who was deeply influenced by her religious devotion and swore to avenge the sorrow his father's second bigamy with Anna Sophie Reventlow caused his mother on Reventlow, a promise he did keep after the death of his father.

Very little is known about Louise, her interests and personality, because of her reclusive lifestyle, other than her jealousy over her husband's adultery and her religious devotions. She did own a couple of estates as part of her dower as queen, notably Hørsholm, but does not appear to have taken any interest in them.

She died in Copenhagen on 15 March 1721 and was buried in the Roskilde Cathedral.

== Children ==
| Name | Birth | Death | Notes |
|---|---|---|---|
| Christian | 28 June 1697 | 1 October 1698 | died in infancy |
| Christian VI of Denmark | 10 December 1699 | 6 August 1746 | married margravine Sophie Magdalene of Brandenburg-Kulmbach, had issue |
| Frederik Charles | 23 October 1701 | 7 January 1702 | died in infancy |
| George | 6 January 1703 | 12 March 1704 | died in infancy |
| Charlotte Amalie | 6 October 1706 | 28 October 1782 | died unmarried |

== Bibliography ==
- N. D. Riegels: Udkast til fjerde Friderichs hist. after Hoier 1–11. 1795–99.
- A. Hojer: König Fr. IV glorwürdigstes Leben 1–11, 1829.
- Jens Moller i Det skand. lit. selsk.s skr. XXIII, 1832 3–196.
- Ellen Jørgensen and J. Skovgaard: Danske dronninger, 1909–10 189–94.
- Fr. Weilbach i Hist. t. 10. r. III, 1935 256–66.
- Ingrid llsoe i Fund og forskn. XXII, 1975–76 107–20.

== Ancestry ==
Ancestors of Louise of Mecklenburg-Güstrow

8. John VII, Duke of Mecklenburg-Schwerin
4. John Albert II, Duke of Mecklenburg-Güstrow
9. Princess Sophia of Schleswig-Holstein-Gottorp
2. Gustav Adolf, Duke of Mecklenburg-Güstrow
10. Christian I, Prince of Anhalt-Bernburg
5. Princess Eleonore Marie of Anhalt-Bernburg
11. Countess Anna of Bentheim-Tecklenburg
1. Louise of Mecklenburg-Güstrow
12. John Adolf, Duke of Schleswig-Holstein-Gottorp
6. Frederick III, Duke of Schleswig-Holstein-Gottorp
13. Princess Augusta of Denmark
3. Magdalene Sibylle of Holstein-Gottorp
14. John George I, Elector of Saxony
7. Duchess Marie Elisabeth of Saxony
15. Duchess Magdalene Sibylle of Prussia

Louise of Mecklenburg-Güstrow House of Mecklenburg-Schwerin Cadet branch of the House of Mecklenburg Born: 28 August 1667 Died: 15 March 1721
Danish royalty
| Preceded by Charlotte Amalie of Hesse-Kassel | Queen consort of Denmark and Norway; 1699–1721 | Succeeded by Anne Sophie Reventlow |
