= Karl, Hereditary Prince of Mecklenburg-Güstrow =

Karl of Mecklenburg-Güstrow
- Hereditary Prince of Mecklenburg-Güstrow
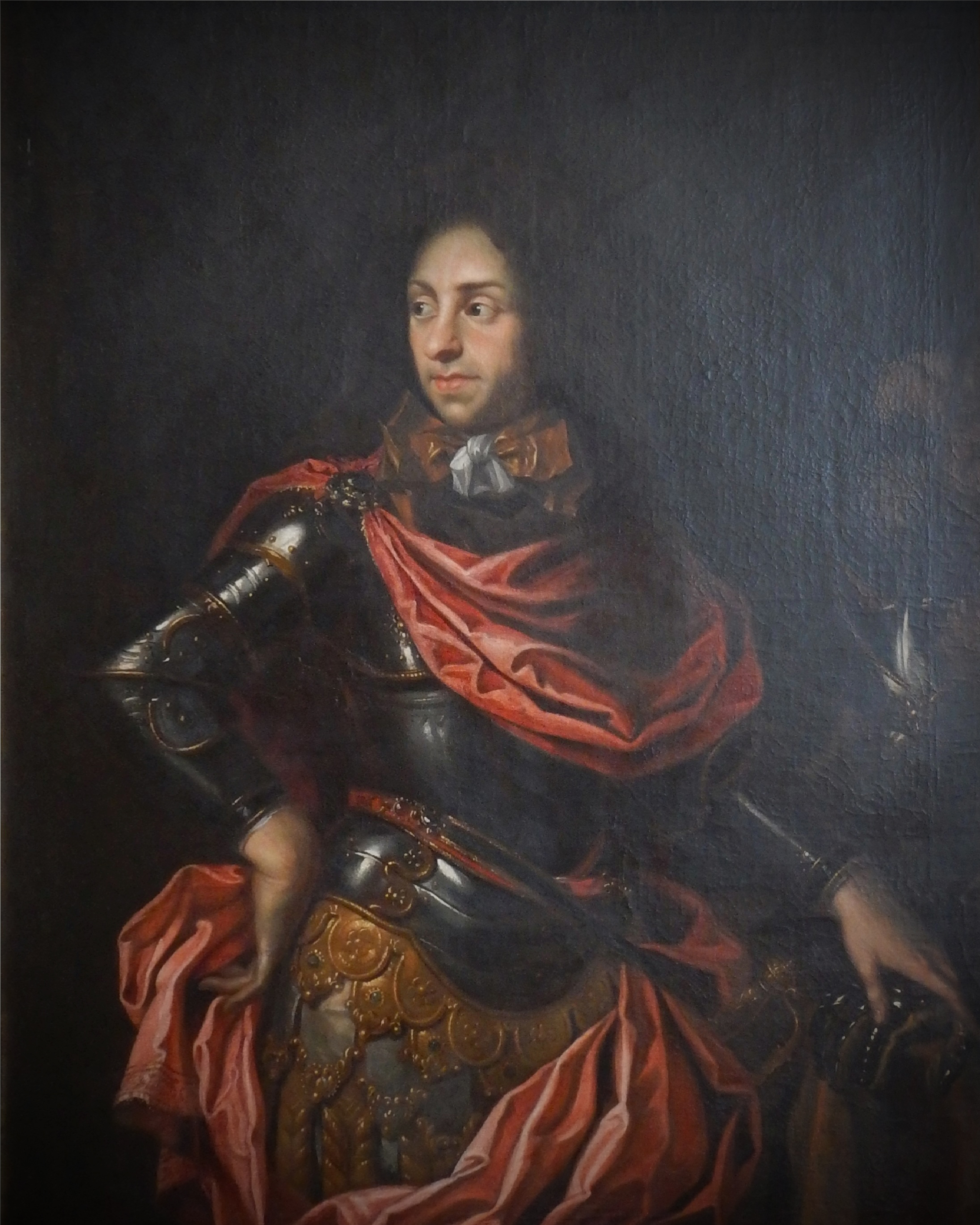
- Portrait by Gedeon Romandon
- Born: 18 November 1664; Güstrow
- Died: 15 March 1688 (aged 23); Güstrow
- Spouse: Marie Amalie of Brandenburg (m. 1687)
- House: House of Mecklenburg
- Father: Gustav Adolph, Duke of Mecklenburg-Güstrow
- Mother: Magdalene Sibylle of Holstein-Gottorp

Karl, Hereditary Prince of Mecklenburg-Güstrow (18 November 1664 in Güstrow – 15 March 1688 in Güstrow) was the hereditary prince of Mecklenburg-Güstrow. He was a son of Gustavus Adolph and his wife Magdalene Sibylle née Duchess of Schleswig-Holstein-Gottorp, a daughter of Frederick III.

== Life ==
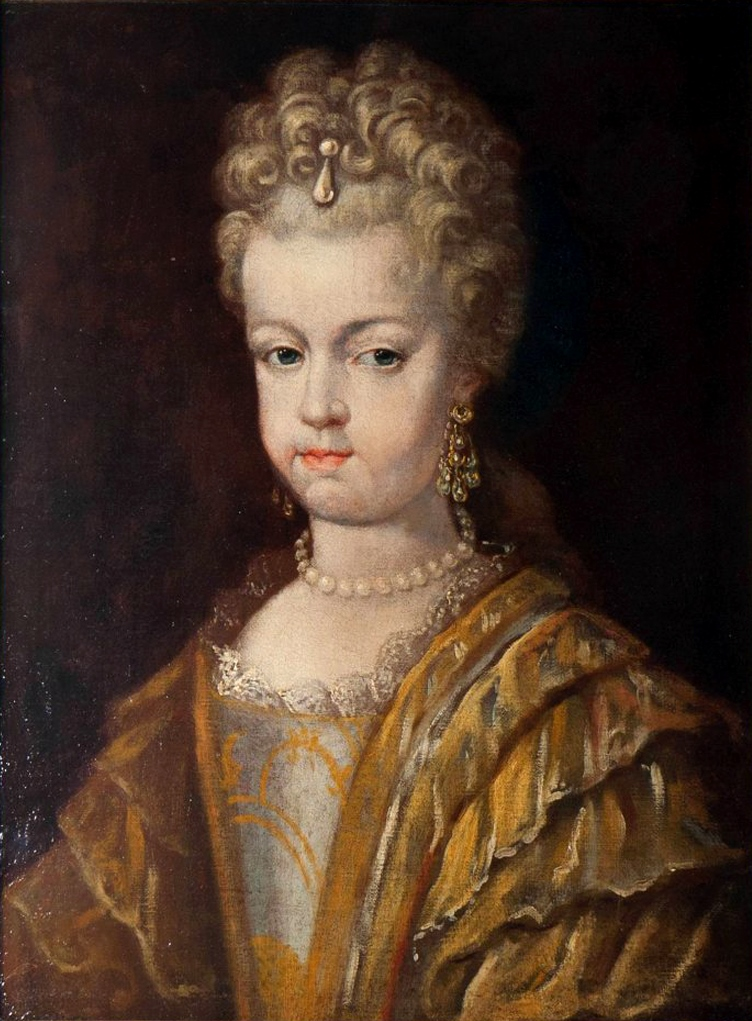
Duchess Maria Amalia of Saxony-Zeitz c 1700

Charles married on 10 August 1687 in Potsdam to Marie Amalie of Brandenburg, the daughter of the "Great Elector" Frederick William of Brandenburg. The marriage remained childless. He died unexpectedly of smallpox. He was the last surviving son of his father, and his wife lost her child when she learned of his fate, so that the Mecklenburg-Güstrow line died out when his father died in 1695.

His brother-in-law, Duke Adolf Frederick II of Mecklenburg-Strelitz claimed Mecklenburg-Güstrow. However Duke Frederick William of Mecklenburg-Schwerin disagreed and the legal situation was unclear, leading to a long succession dispute. The dispute was settled in the Partition of Hamburg, in which the relationship between Mecklenburg-Schwerin and Mecklenburg-Strelitz was redefined and Mecklenburg-Güstrow was given to Mecklenburg-Schwerin.
