= Zörbig =

- Town
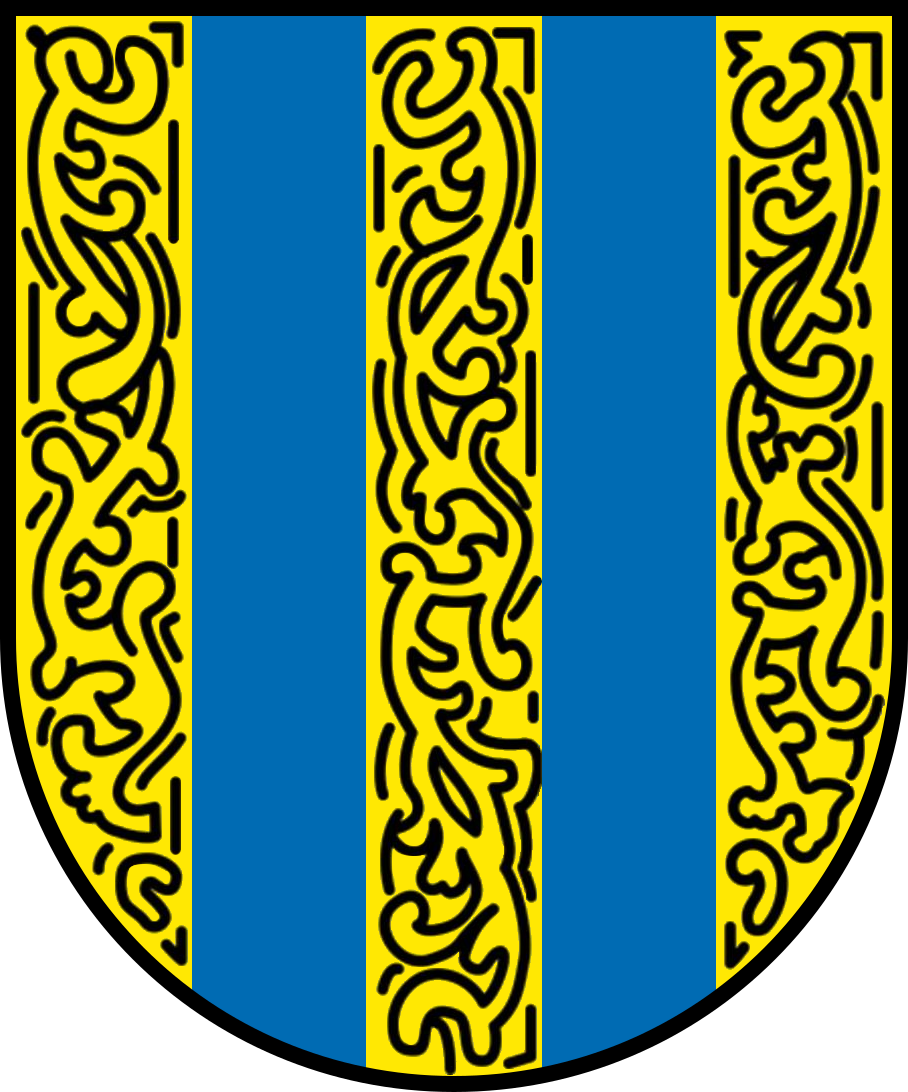
- Coat of arms

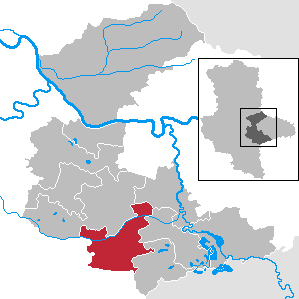
- Location of Zörbig within Anhalt-Bitterfeld district
- Interactive map of Zörbig
- Location within Germany Location within Saxony-Anhalt
- Coordinates: 51°37′N 12°7′E
- Country: Germany
- State: Saxony-Anhalt
- District: Anhalt-Bitterfeld

Government
  - Mayor (2019–26): Matthias Egert

Area
  - Total: 113.68 km^{2} (43.89 sq mi)
- Elevation: 89 m (292 ft)

Population (2025-12-31)
  - Total: 8,787
  - Density: 77.30/km^{2} (200.2/sq mi)
- Time zone: UTC+01:00 (CET)
  - Summer (DST): UTC+02:00 (CEST)
- Postal codes: 06780, 06369
- Dialling codes: 034956, 034975
- Vehicle registration: ABI
- Website: www.stadt-zoerbig.de

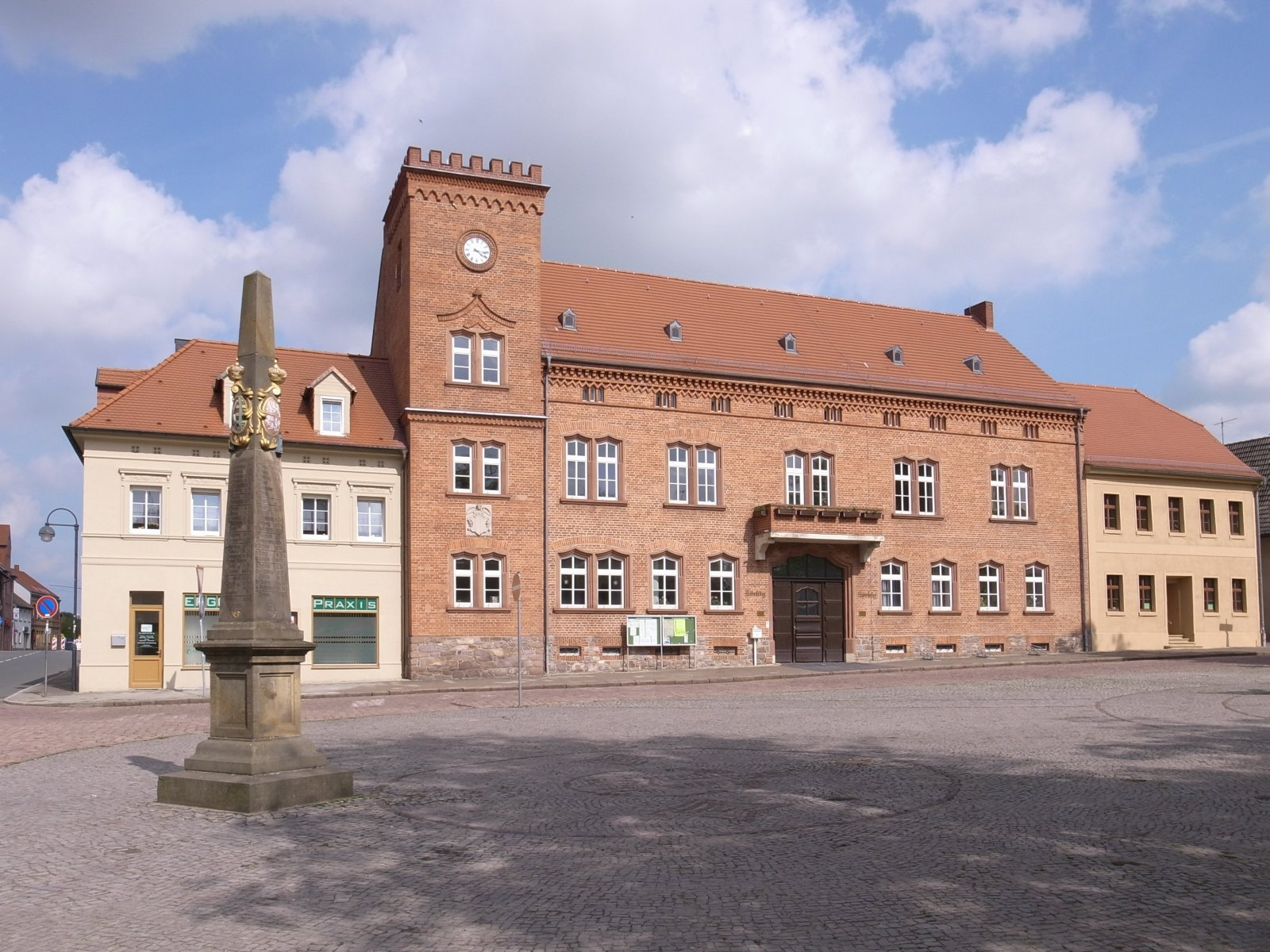
Town hall.

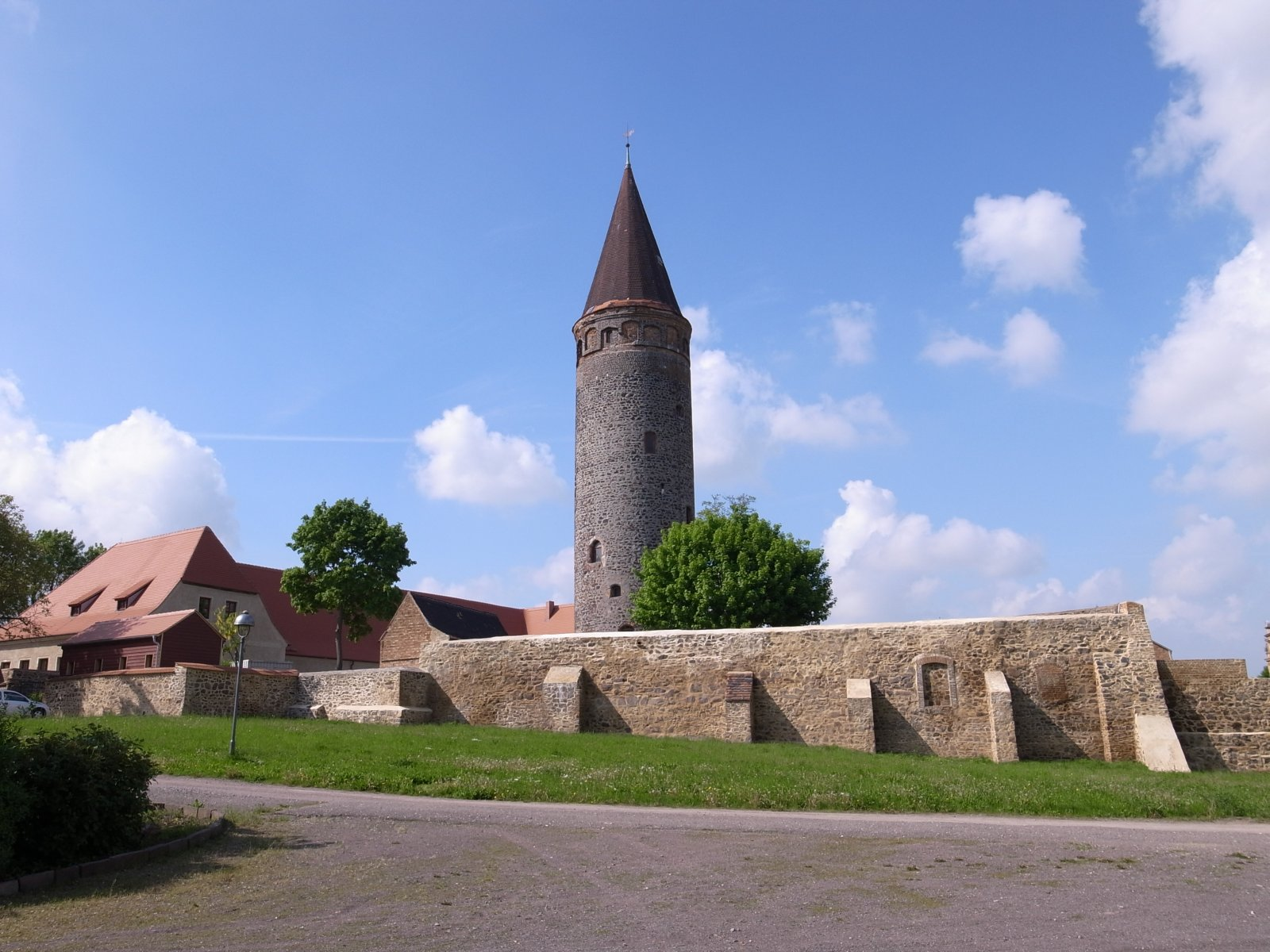
Castle.

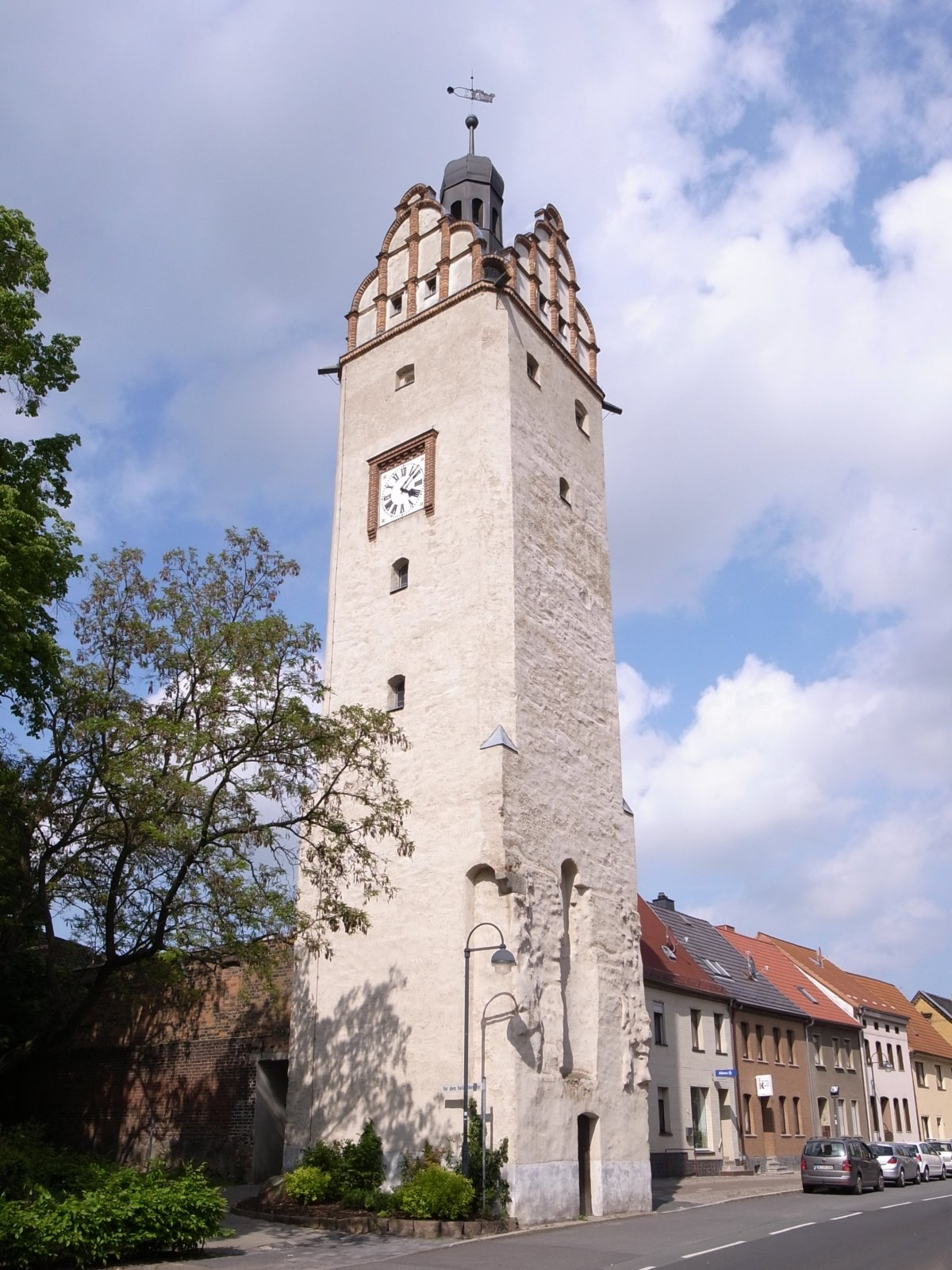
"Hallescher Turm".

Zörbig (German pronunciation: [ˈtsœʁbɪç]) is a town in the district of Anhalt-Bitterfeld in Saxony-Anhalt, Germany. It is situated approximately 15 km west of Bitterfeld, and 20 km northeast of Halle (Saale). Zörbig is well known for its molasses made from sugar beets.

== Geography ==
The town Zörbig consists of the following Ortschaften or municipal divisions:

- Cösitz
- Göttnitz
- Großzöberitz
- Löberitz
- Quetzdölsdorf
- Salzfurtkapelle
- Schortewitz
- Schrenz
- Spören
- Stumsdorf
- Zörbig

== People ==
- Thomas Selle (1599–1663), composer and church musician
- Johann Jacob Reiske (1716–1774), Graezist, Arabist and Byzantinist
- August Gottlieb Richter (1742–1812), surgeon
- Carl Marx (1911–1991), painter, pupil at the Bauhaus Dessau 1931-33
