= Countess Henriette Charlotte of Nassau-Idstein =

Henriette Charlotte of Nassau-Idstein
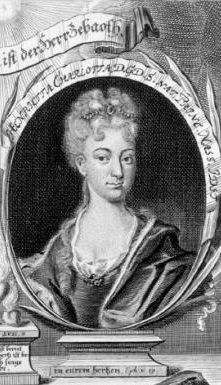

Duchess consort of Saxe-Merseburg
- Tenure: 1711-1731
- Born: 9 November 1693; Idstein Castle, Idstein
- Died: 8 April 1734 (aged 40); Delitzsch Castle, Delitzsch
- Spouse: Maurice Wilhelm, Duke of Saxe-Merseburg
- Issue: Princess Fredericka Ulrike
- House: Nassau
- Father: George August, Count of Nassau-Idstein
- Mother: Henriette Dorothea of Oettingen-Oettingen

Henriette Charlotte of Nassau-Idstein (9 November 1693 – 8 April 1734), was a German noblewoman member of the House of Nassau and by marriage Duchess of Saxe-Merseburg.

Born in Idstein Castle, Idstein, she was the fourth of twelve children born from the marriage of George August, Count and since 1688 Prince of Nassau-Saarbrücken-Idstein and Henriette Dorothea of Oettingen-Oettingen. From her eleven older and younger siblings, only four survived to adulthood: Christine Louise (by marriage Princess of East Frisia), Albertine Juliane (by marriage Hereditary Princess of Saxe-Eisenach), Auguste Fredericka (by marriage Princess of Nassau-Weilburg) and Johannette Wilhelmine (by marriage Countess of Lippe-Detmold).

== Life ==
In Idstein on 4 November 1711, Henriette Charlotte secretly married Maurice Wilhelm, Duke of Saxe-Merseburg.

After eight years of childless union, on 23 June 1720, the Duchess gave birth to a daughter, Fredericka Ulrike, who died within hours. Although she officially appears as the Duke's daughter, it is highly probable that she was the product of the affair of her mother with Friedrich Carl von Pöllnitz, Henriette Charlotte's Hofmarshal and lover for several years.

After her husband's death in 1731, Henriette Charlotte retired to Delitzsch Castle, Delitzsch, where she openly lived with von Pöllnitz until her death three years later, aged 40. She was buried in the Stadtkirche SS Peter und Paul, Delitzsch.

Countess Henriette Charlotte of Nassau-Idstein House of Nassau Born: 9 November 1693 Died: 8 April 1734
German royalty
Vacant Title last held by Erdmuthe Dorothea of Saxe-Zeitz	Duchess consort of Saxe-Merseburg; 1711-1731	Succeeded by Elisabeth of Mecklenburg-Güstrow
