= Christian III Maurice =

Christian III Maurice (Merseburg, 7 November 1680 – Merseburg, 14 November 1694), was a duke of Saxe-Merseburg and member of the House of Wettin.

== Life ==
The eldest son of Christian II, Duke of Saxe-Merseburg, and Erdmuthe Dorothea of Saxe-Zeitz, at age 13 Christian Maurice succeeded his father upon his death on 20 October 1694. During his minority, the Elector Frederick August I of Saxony took over the administration of the duchy as regent. However, the custody of the young duke was mainly the responsibility of his mother, the dowager duchess Erdmuthe Dorothea, who also took an interest in governing the duchy.

The new duke died of smallpox after having reigned for only twenty-five days and was succeeded by his younger brother Maurice Wilhelm.

Preceded by Christian II	Duke of Saxe-Merseburg; 1694	Succeeded by Maurice Wilhelm
