= Idstein =

- Town
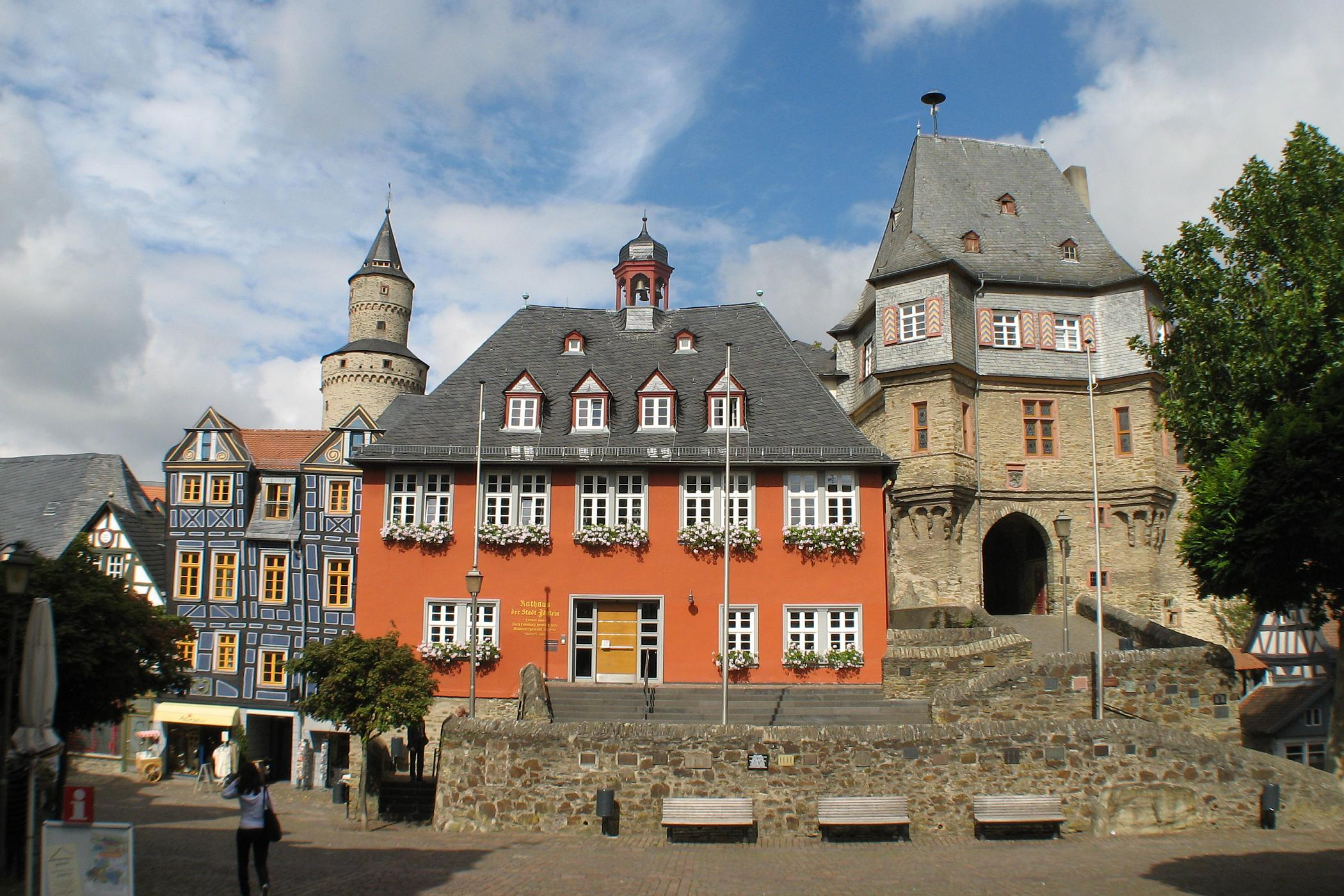
- Rathaus, entrance to the castle and Hexenturm

- Flag Coat of arms

- Location of Idstein within Rheingau-Taunus-Kreis district
- Interactive map of Idstein
- Location within Germany Location within Hesse
- Coordinates: 50°13′17″N 8°16′11″E
- Country: Germany
- State: Hesse
- Admin. region: Darmstadt
- District: Rheingau-Taunus-Kreis

Government
  - Mayor (2019–25): Christian Herfurth (CDU)

Area
  - Total: 79.76 km^{2} (30.80 sq mi)
- Elevation: 517 m (1,696 ft)

Population (2025-12-31)
  - Total: 25,724
  - Density: 322.5/km^{2} (835.3/sq mi)
- Time zone: UTC+01:00 (CET)
  - Summer (DST): UTC+02:00 (CEST)
- Postal codes: 65510
- Dialling codes: 06126
- Vehicle registration: RÜD, SWA
- Website: www.idstein.de

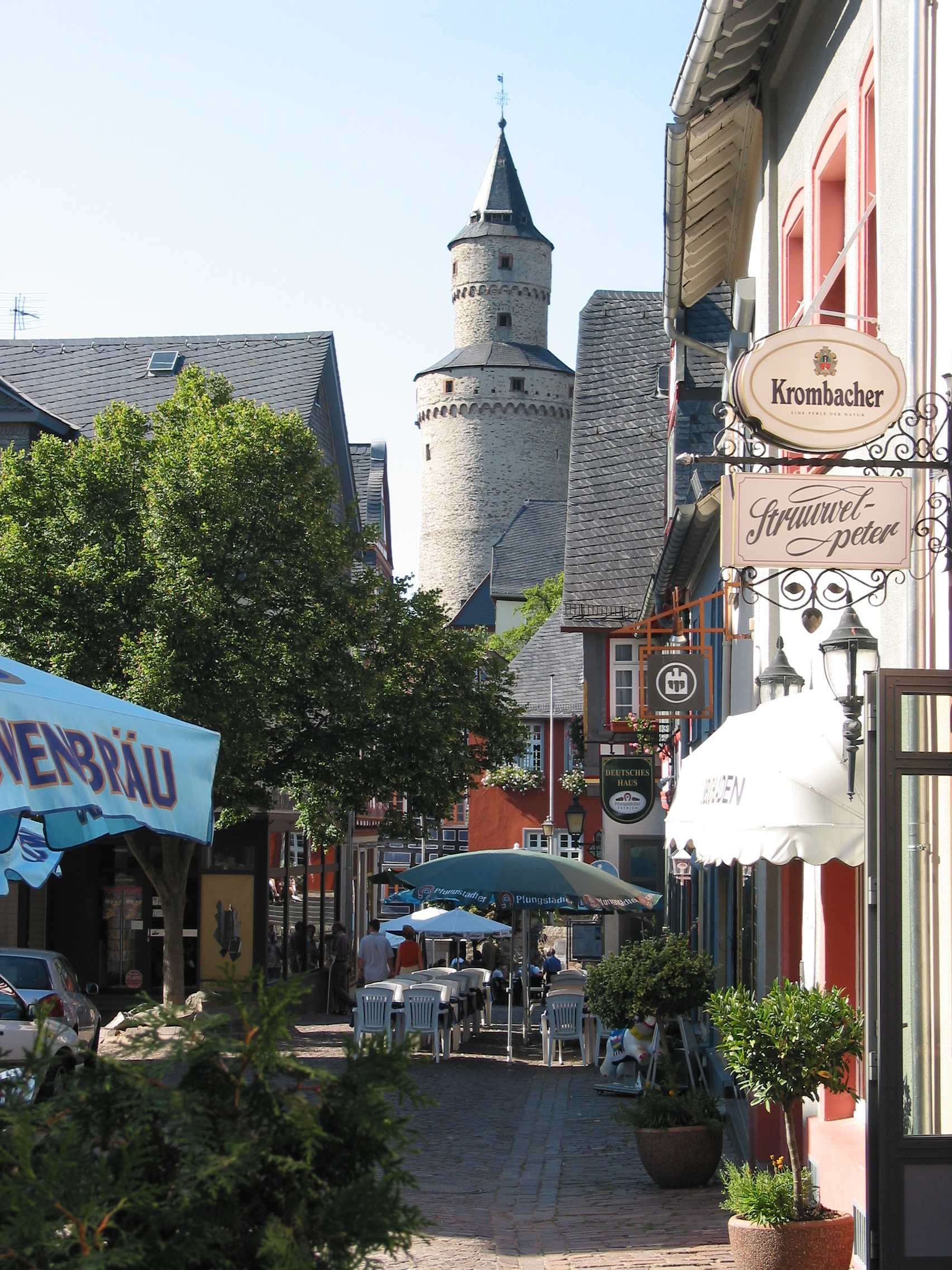
The Hexenturm (Witches' Tower)

Idstein (German: [ˈɪtʃtaɪn]) is a town of about 25,000 inhabitants in the Rheingau-Taunus-Kreis in the Regierungsbezirk of Darmstadt in Hesse, Germany. Because of its well preserved historical Altstadt (old town), it is part of the Deutsche Fachwerkstraße (German Timber-Frame Road), connecting towns with fine fachwerk buildings and houses. In 2002, the town hosted the 42nd Hessentag state festival.

== Geography ==
=== Location ===
Idstein lies in the Taunus mountain range, about 16 kilometres (10 miles) north of Wiesbaden. The town's landmark is the Hexenturm (Witches' Tower), a 12th-century bergfried and part of Idstein Castle.

The Old Town is found between the two brooks running through town, the Wolfsbach in the east and the Wörsbach in the west, on a high ridge reaching up to 400 m (1,300 ft) above sea level. This comes to an end in the Old Town's north end with the castle and palace crags, behind which the two brooks run together. On the Wolfsbach, remnants of the like-named, now forsaken village can still be made out. The estate agent Gassenbach in the town's south goes back to an old settlement called Gassenbach; for the last few years, it has belonged to the Domäne Mechtildshausen, an organic farming operation.

West of town, beyond the Wörsbach valley, lies another high ridge with peaks ranging from the Hohe Kanzel (592 m or 1,942 ft) to the Roßberg (426 m or 1,398 ft) and the Rügert (402 m or 1,319 ft) to the Rosenkippel (379 m or 1,243 ft); to the south, the Galgenberg (348 m or 1,142 ft) forms another high area over to the Dasbach Heath. Just under the western heights run the Autobahn A 3 and the Cologne-Frankfurt high-speed rail line (in the Idsteintunnel along the slope).

On the other side of the Rügert are the constituent communities of Oberauroff and Niederauroff in the valley of the Auroffer Bach.

North of Idstein, the Wörsbach valley reaches into the Goldener Grund, fertile cropland that stretches all the way to the Lahn valley.

=== Neighbouring communities ===
Idstein borders in the north on the town of Bad Camberg (Limburg-Weilburg) and the community of Waldems (Rheingau-Taunus-Kreis), in the east on the community of Glashütten (Hochtaunuskreis), in the southeast on the town of Eppstein (Main-Taunus-Kreis), in the south on the community of Niedernhausen, in the southwest on the town of Taunusstein and in the west on the community of Hünstetten (all three in the Rheingau-Taunus-Kreis).

=== Constituent communities ===
The town is made up of a main town bearing the same name as the whole and eleven other, formerly independent villages:

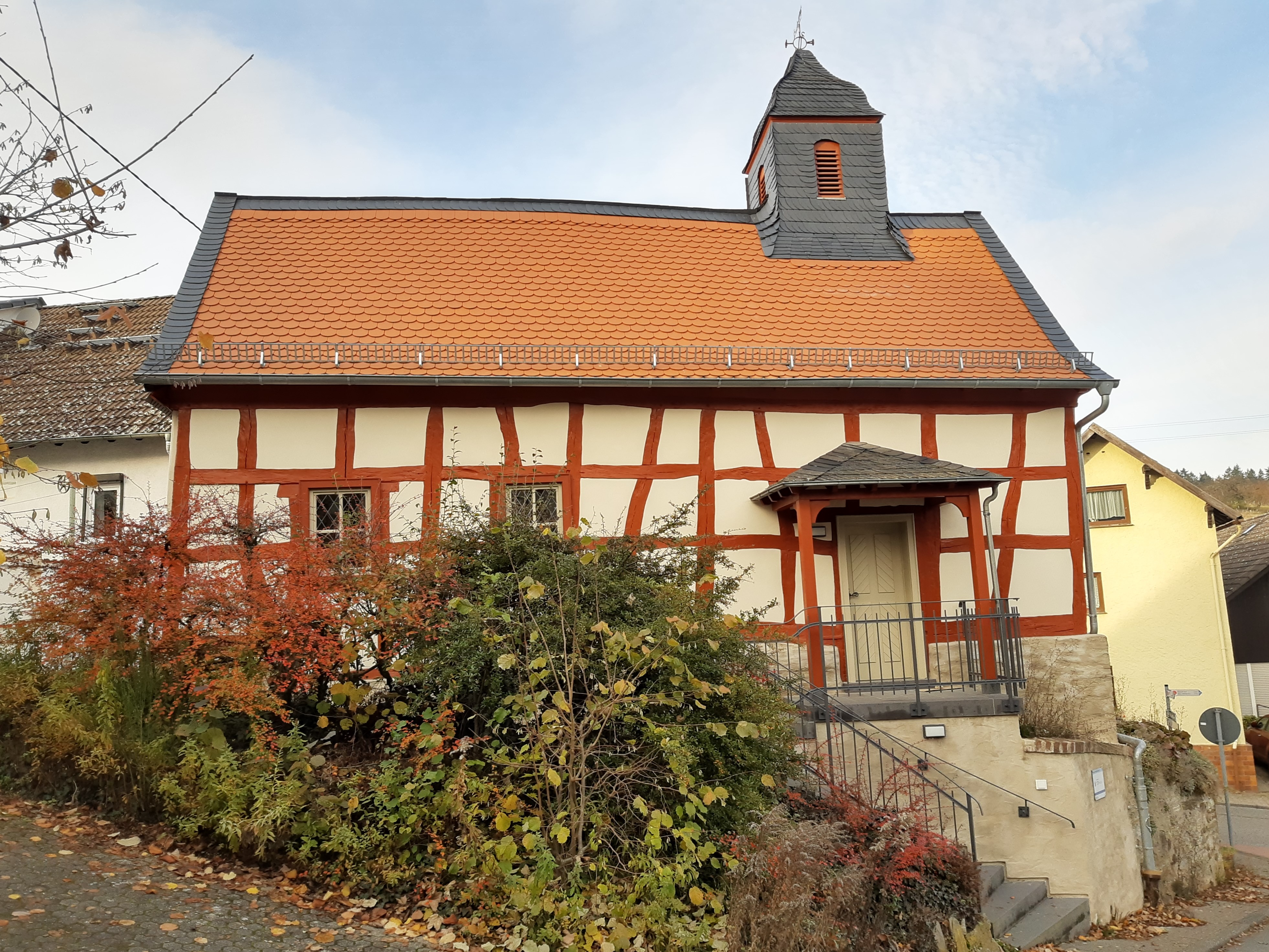
Türmchen in Ehrenbach

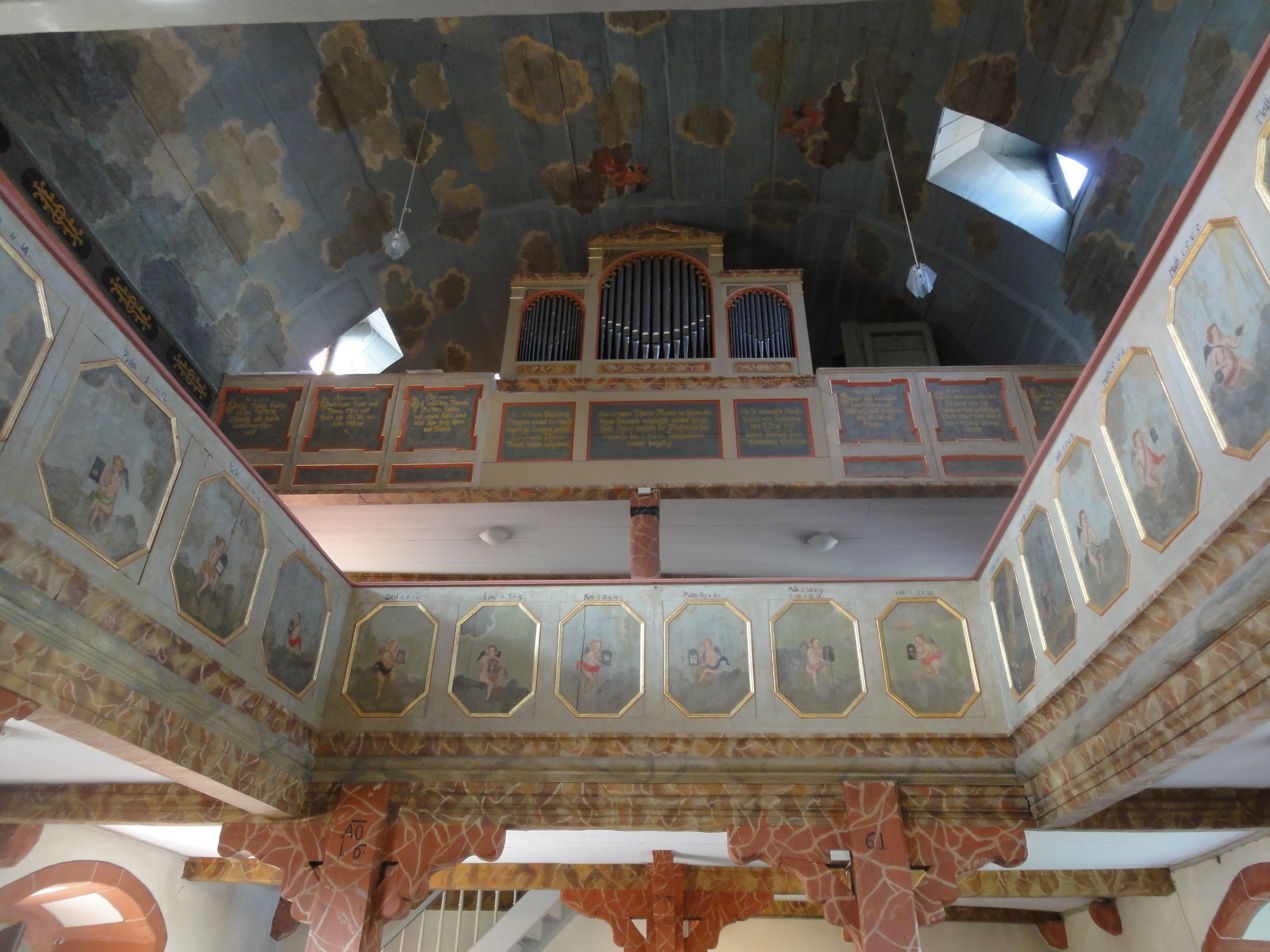
Baroque interior of the Christuskirche, Walsdorf

Stadtteil	Inhabitants
Idstein (main town)	15,605
Dasbach	326
Ehrenbach	303
Eschenhahn	773
Heftrich	1,619
Kröftel	524
Lenzhahn	261
Niederauroff	390
Nieder-Oberrod	576
Oberauroff	322
Walsdorf	1,535
Wörsdorf	3,638

Until 1977, Idstein belonged to the Untertaunuskreis (district seat, Bad Schwalbach), which in the course of district reform was merged with the Rheingau-Kreis into the new Rheingau-Taunus-Kreis. With about 25,700 inhabitants, Idstein is the second biggest town in the district (after Taunusstein).

== History ==
Idstein, which had its first documentary mention in 1102 as Etichenstein, was granted town and market rights in 1287 by King Rudolph of Habsburg. Besides the above-mentioned Hexenturm near the old Nassau castle, the town has a mediaeval town centre with many timber-frame buildings. The town's oldest preserved house was originally built in 1410.

From the documentary mention in 1102 until 1721, Idstein was, with interruptions, residence of the Counts of Nassau-Idstein and other Nassau lines. One of the Counts, Adolf of Germany, was, as a compromise candidate, the Holy Roman Emperor from 1292 to 1298, later falling in battle against the anti-king Albrecht I of Habsburg.

The Nassau Counts' holdings were subdivided many times among heirs, with the parts being brought together again whenever a line died out. This yielded an older Nassau-Idstein line from 1480 to 1509, later merging once again with Nassau-Wiesbaden and Nassau-Weilburg and, from 1629 to 1721, a newer Nassau-Idstein line.

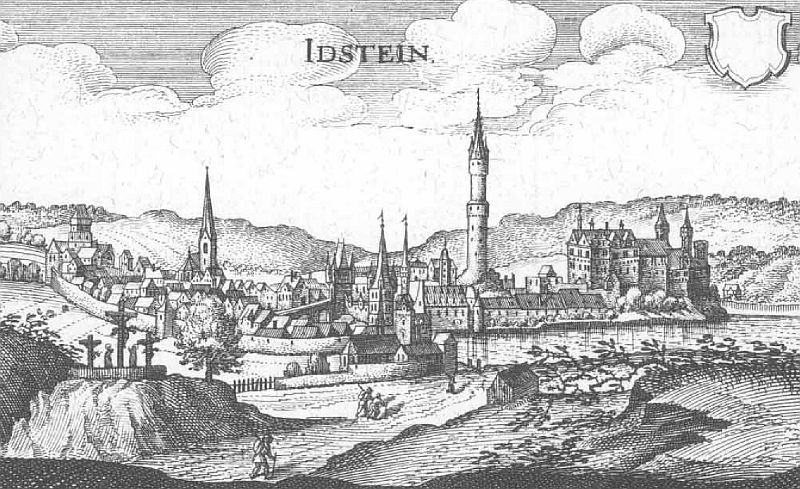
Idstein – extract from Topographia Hassiae by Matthäus Merian the Younger, 1655

In the 17th century, Count Johann of Nassau-Idstein persecuted witches in Idstein.

In 1721, Idstein passed to Nassau-Ottweiler, and in 1728 to Nassau-Usingen, thereby losing its status as a residence town, although it became the seat of the Nassau Archives and of an Oberamt.

Nassau-Usingen was united with Nassau-Weilburg in 1806 into the Duchy of Nassau, becoming a member of the Confederation of the Rhine. After the Austro-Prussian War in 1866, Prussia annexed the Duchy as the Prussian province of Hesse-Nassau.

The residential palace from the 17th century is used by the Pestalozzischule as a school building. It was expanded with a new building below the palace.

From the late 18th century to the mid 20th, Idstein was the centre of an important leather industry. During the Second World War, many women became forced labour for work in the tanneries. In 1959, the dominant tannery in the middle of the town core was shut down for economic reasons. The lands right at the edge of the Old Town lay empty and were used until the 1980s as a carpark. Today, new shops and apartments surround the Löherplatz, which is now a marketplace.

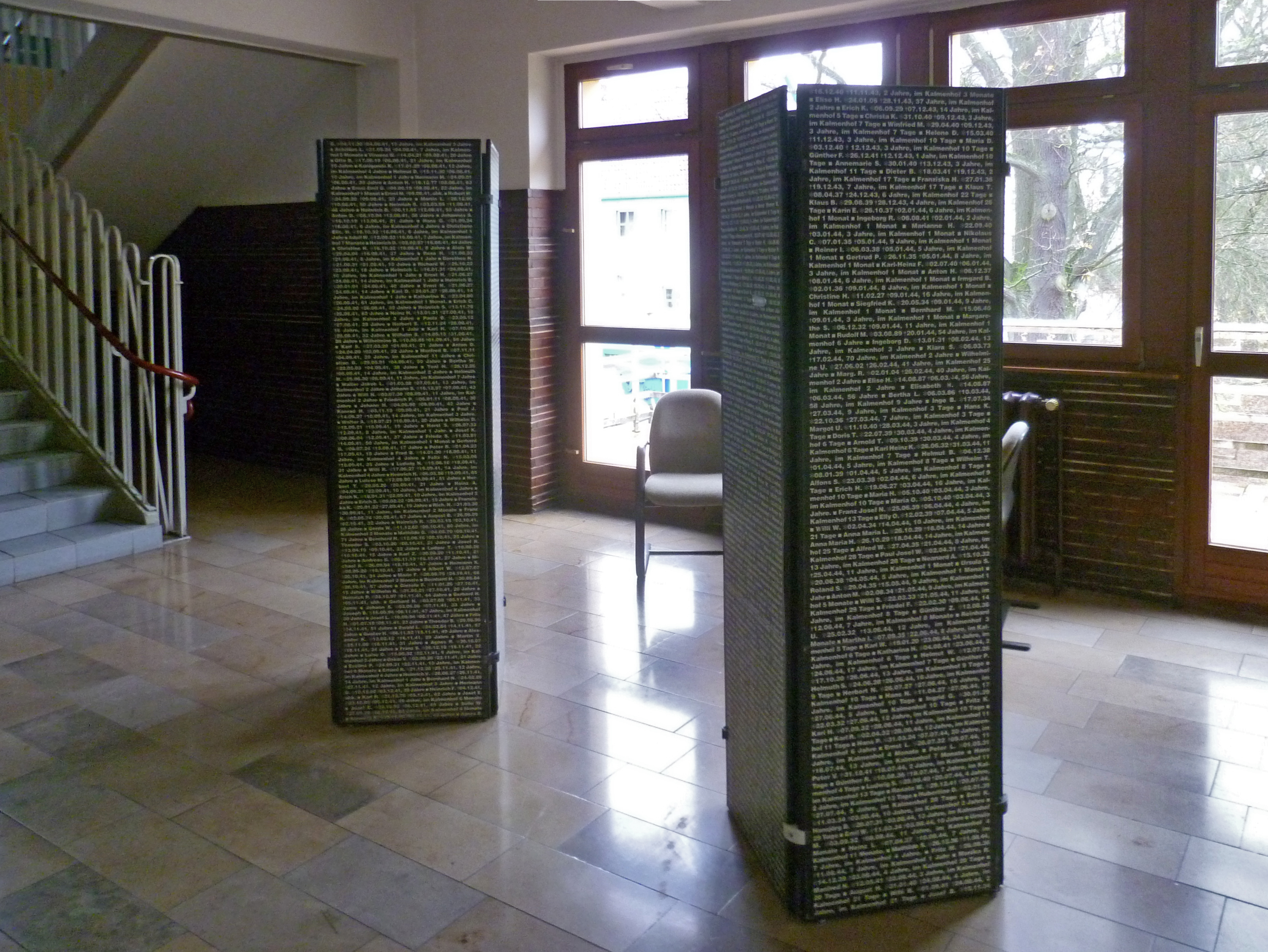
A memorial at the Kalmenhof clinic, listing the names of the victims murdered there

The private Kalmenhof clinic in Idstein was drawn into the Nazi Euthanasia programme. Under Action T4, the Kalmenhof served as a way station for Hadamar killing centre. After the gassings at Hadamar came to an end in the face of public protests, especially from the churches, the Kalmenhof itself, in the course of Aktion Brandt, became a killing institute; patients here were murdered with poison injections.

Shortly after the war, reports of young wards being mishandled came to light.

Eleven formerly independent villages were merged as of 1971 into Idstein, under the framework of municipal reform.

== Population development ==
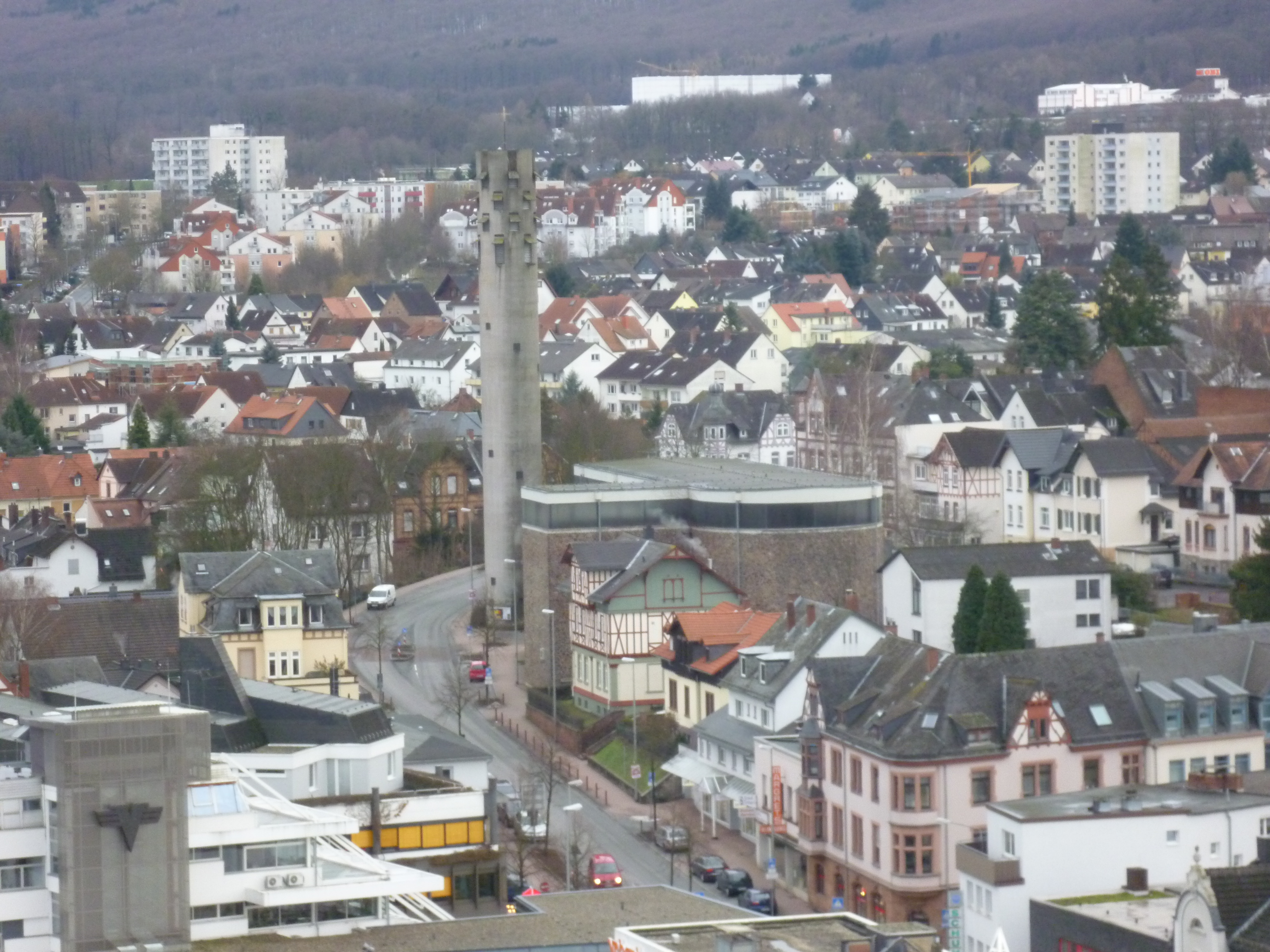
View from the Hexenturm to St. Martin, 2010

(as of 31 December)

Year	Population
1998	22,346
1999	22,611
2000	22,611
2001	22,786
2002	22,998
2003	22,893
2004	22,894
2005	23,229
2006	25,696

== Politics ==
=== Coat of arms ===
The town's arms might be described thus: Azure a round castle wall embattled with two portcullises open, the wall enclosing two towers, the whole Or, with peaked roofs gules, between the portcullises an inescutcheon azure with a lion rampant Or armed and langued gules among six billets Or.

The inescutcheon is the arms borne by the House of Nassau. The town's flag also bears this design set against orange and blue, Nassau's colours.

== Twin towns – sister cities ==
Idstein is twinned with:

- Heusden, Netherlands
- Lana, Italy
- Şile, Turkey
- Uglich, Russia
- Zwijndrecht, Belgium

== Economy and infrastructure ==
=== Transport ===
Idstein has an interchange on the Autobahn A 3 north of Wiesbaden between Niedernhausen and Bad Camberg, and a railway station with direct connections to Limburg an der Lahn, Frankfurt am Main and Wiesbaden.

The building of a bypass, Bundesstraße 275, lessened the traffic in the historic Old Town. However, the traffic volume in the town core is still very high.

At intersections in the town core, roundabouts have improved the traffic flow, in some places noticeably. The Südtangente (south "tangent" road), which had been planned since 1981, was completed in 2009, reducing traffic in town further. It links two new development areas. Of the €9,000,000 for the project, roughly 60% was borne by the state of Hesse.

=== Local transport ===
Within Idstein town limits are two railway stations on the Main-Lahn Railway (Main-Lahn-Bahn), Idstein and Wörsdorf. Hourly trains serving the Frankfurt/Wiesbaden–Niedernhausen–Limburg line run into the evening. In Niedernhausen there is also a transfer point with S-Bahn line S2 towards Dietzenbach through the Frankfurt and Offenbach S-Bahn tunnels.

The Idstein town bus (de Idstaaner) serves 3 lines:

- 221 Railway station–Eisenbach–Taubenberg–Gänsberg–ZOB Schulgasse–Railway station (formerly 401)
- 222 Railway station–ZOB Schulgasse–Gänsberg–Taubenberg–Eisenbach–Railway station (formerly 402)
- 223 (booster line) Railway station–Dasbach–Heftrich–Niederrod (formerly 403)

The town bus is run by ORN (Omnibusverkehr Rhein-Nahe). It uses mainly Midi low-floor buses built by MAN. Most journeys made by bus 223 are arranged in response to demand.

Moreover, many regional buses also serve Idstein, linking important areas not served by the town bus as they go.

- 220 Idstein–Niedernhausen–Oberjosbach (formerly 5460)
- 224 Idstein–Ehrenbach–Görsroth–Idstein
- 225 Railway station–ZOB–Nassauviertel–Hünstetten–Neuhof–(Wiesbaden)
- 226 Railway station–ZOB–Nassauviertel–Wallrabenstein–Ketternschwalbach (formerly 103)
- 227 Görsroth–Idstein
- 230 Idstein–Esch–Bad Camberg (formerly 5465)
- 233 Idstein/Bad Camberg–Esch–Wüstems
- 239 Idstein–Waldems
- 271 ZOB–Railway station–Am Wörtzgarten–Neuhof–Platte–Wiesbaden main railway station (formerly 5461)

Since timetable changes in July 2007, many journeys, particularly on weekends or in the evening, have been served by demand-responsive buses.

Bus services in the countryside around Idstein (the Idsteiner Land) are likewise run by ORN, which contracts the work out to companies such as Omnibus Mester from Eppstein-Bremthal, Omnibus Weber, Paul-Reisen or Wahl-Reisen (all from Hünstetten).

=== Established businesses ===
Roughly 200 small and midsize businesses, mainly in crafts and retail sales, characterize Idstein's business life; four out of every five have fewer than ten employees.

Among the bigger businesses in town are, for instance, Motorola Solutions Germany GmbH, Serviceware SE, Jack Wolfskin, DG-Verlag (distribution and logistics), ERNST SCHMITZ Logistics & Technical Services GmbH, Black & Decker Deutschland GmbH, INGENIUMDESIGN, Hochschule Fresenius gGmbH, Lebensmittelmärkte Uwe Georg e.K. and Titleist.

Another important employer and factor in the economy is the Landeswohlfahrtsverband Hessen (Hesse State Welfare Federation) with its SPZ (paediatric centre) Kalmenhof, an institution aiding youths and people with handicaps.

As an historical and middle centre in Idsteiner Land, Idstein has a retail structure. Its location on the Frankfurt/Wiesbaden – Limburg railway and the A 3 and a number of commuters put the shopping centres in Limburg an der Lahn and Wiesbaden as well as those throughout the Frankfurt Rhine Main Region in direct competition with the local retailers.

=== Major building projects ===
In the course of the 2002 Hessentag, many great building (and sometimes conversion) projects were undertaken. The building of the connecting road Tiergartenspange reduced traffic in the Old Town.

Three new building areas have been developed:

- Nassau-Viertel (mixed-use area in the town's northwest along Bundesstraße 275)
- South bypass road
- Taunusviertel (in the town's southeast)

==== Major building projects since Hessentag ====
- New building work on the Grundschule Auf der Au (primary school) and the Erich-Kästner-Schule (completed 2005)
- New building work on the police station (inner town, completed 2006) in connection with conversion work on the Amtsgericht (court, still in progress)
- New building work on the Campus Europa Hochschule Fresenius (college in the inner town, under construction)
- New building work on the Tournesol-Allwetterbad (swimming pool) with biomass power station in the Nassau-Viertel
- New building work on the health centre/hospital
- Kappus-Anlage (at the "railway station roundabout"): doctors' centre and discount market (completed 2008)
- Ramp onto the A 3 from Bundesstraße 275 towards Frankfurt (completed: April 2008)

=== Public institutions ===
- Idstein Protestant parish
- Idstein St. Martin Catholic parish
- Idstein volunteer fire brigade
- Idstein youth centre

=== State institutions ===
- Amtsgericht (court)
- Technisches Hilfswerk (THW)
- Sozialpädagogisches Zentrum Kalmenhof (State Welfare Federation institution)

=== Education ===
- Taubenbergschule (primary school)
- Alteburgschule Heftrich (primary school)
- Franz-Kade-Schule (Wörsdorf primary school)
- Limesschule (cooperative comprehensive school with Hauptschule and Realschule branches)
- Grundschule Auf der Au (primary school)
- Erich Kästner-Schule (school for those in need of learning help)
- Pestalozzischule (Gymnasium)
- Hochschule Fresenius (college)
- Volkshochschule Rheingau-Taunus (folk high school)

=== Hospital ===
In 2008, the hospital moved into a new €22,000,000, 90-bed building on an 18,000 m^{2} (190,000 sq ft) plot on Robert-Koch-Straße. The state provided a subsidy of €17,200,000 (earlier, €3,000,000 came from the district, which had forgone part of the buying price for the former district hospitals at Idstein und Bad Schwalbach).

=== Swimming pool ===
A partly prefabricated all-weather pool came into being (after some delays) in spring 2010 in the Nassau-Viertel for €19,000,000. The town is subsidizing the more than €2,500,000 plot on Bundesstraße 275 and the yearly €500,000 operating costs. For the manufacturer, it is, with its cupola, biomass power plant and natural bathing pond a demonstration project near Frankfurt Airport.

== Culture and sightseeing ==
=== Buildings ===
==== Unionskirche ====
The Unionskirche, whose outer appearance is quite plain, holds within its splendour. The building history of the church, originally consecrated to Saint Martin of Tours as a monastery church, reaches back to the 13th century. In the mid 14th century a new building in the Gothic style arose, which was remodeled in the 17th century.

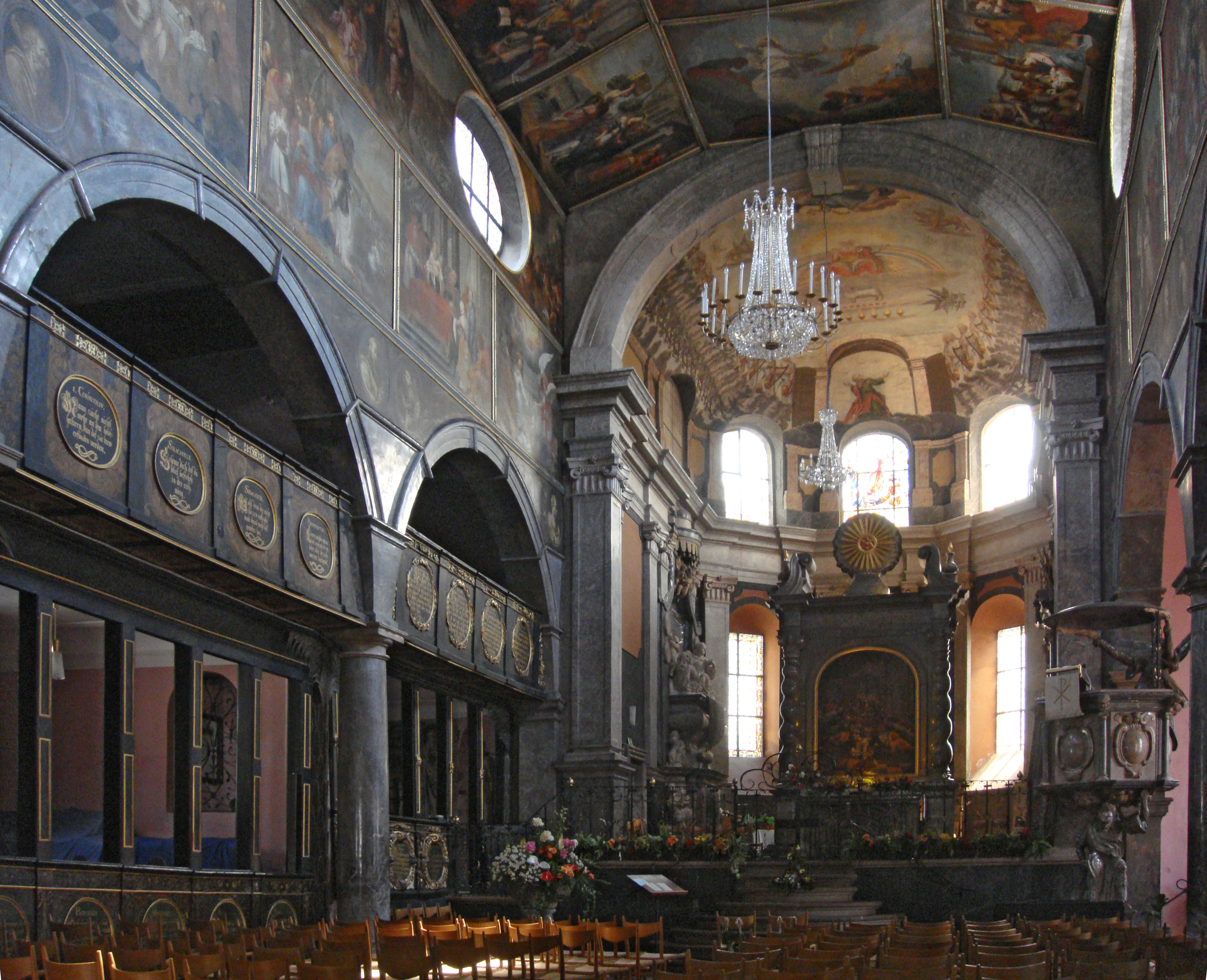
Inside of the Unionskirche towards the main altar.

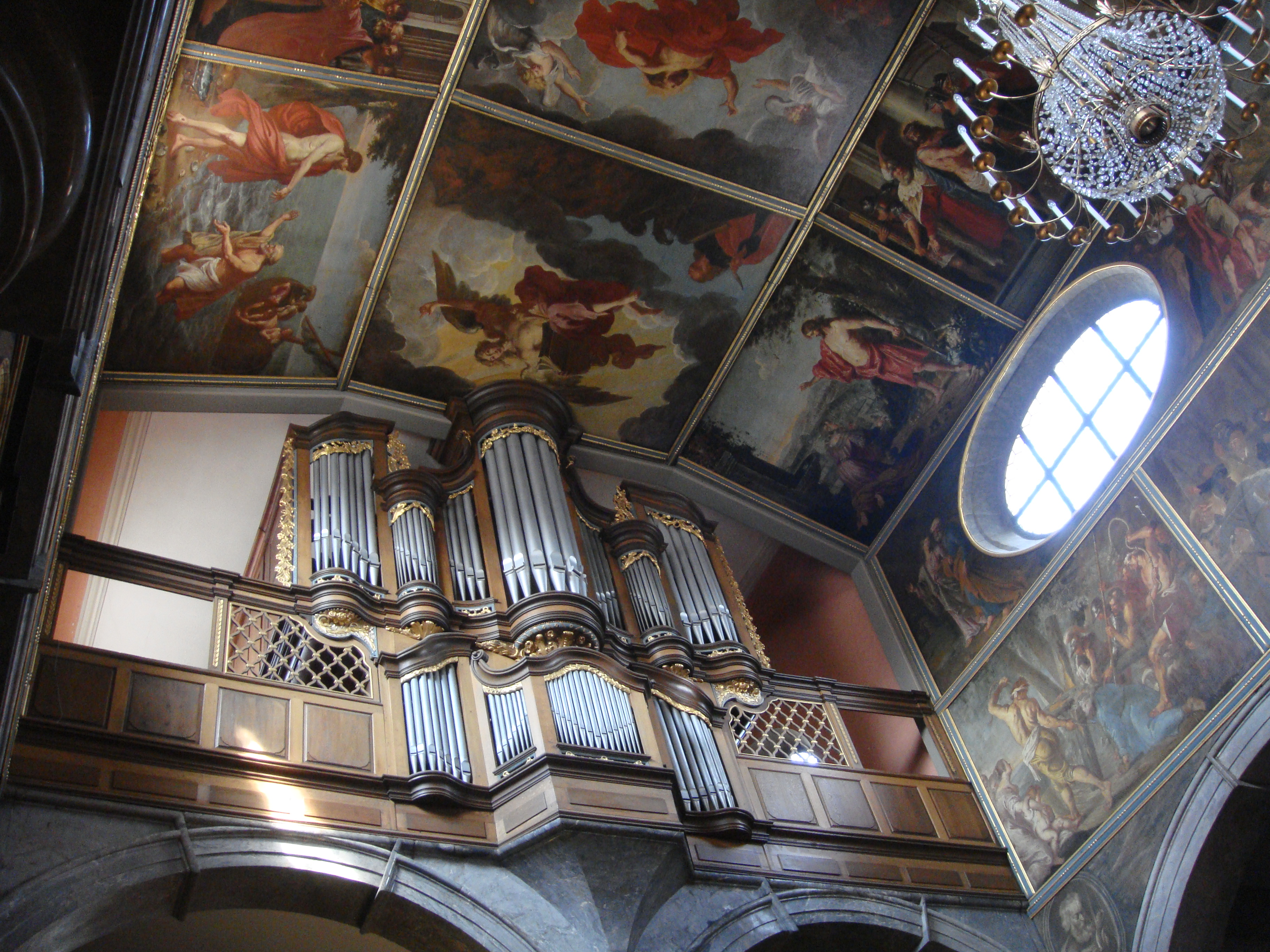
Walcker organ and ceiling

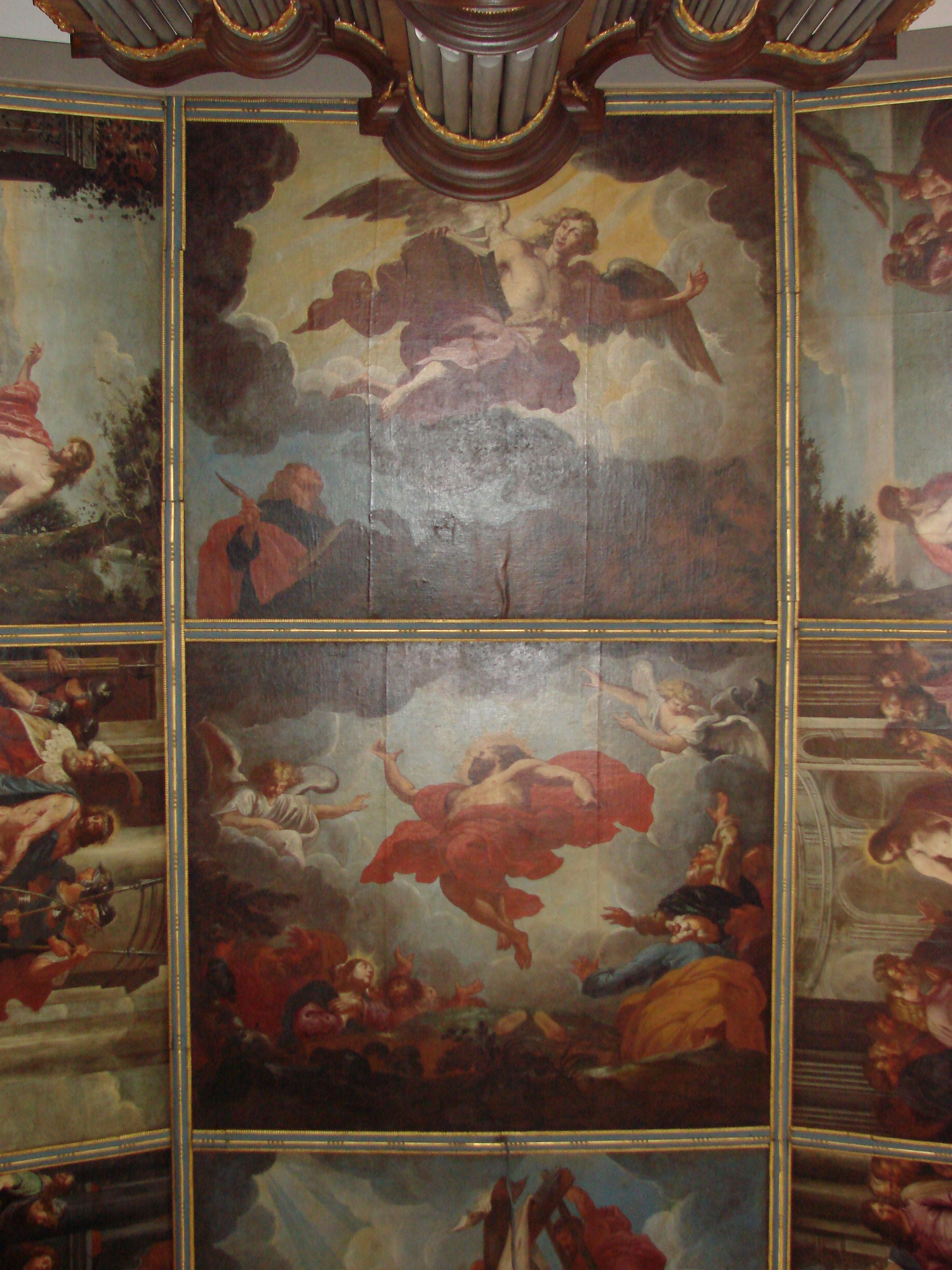
Ceiling

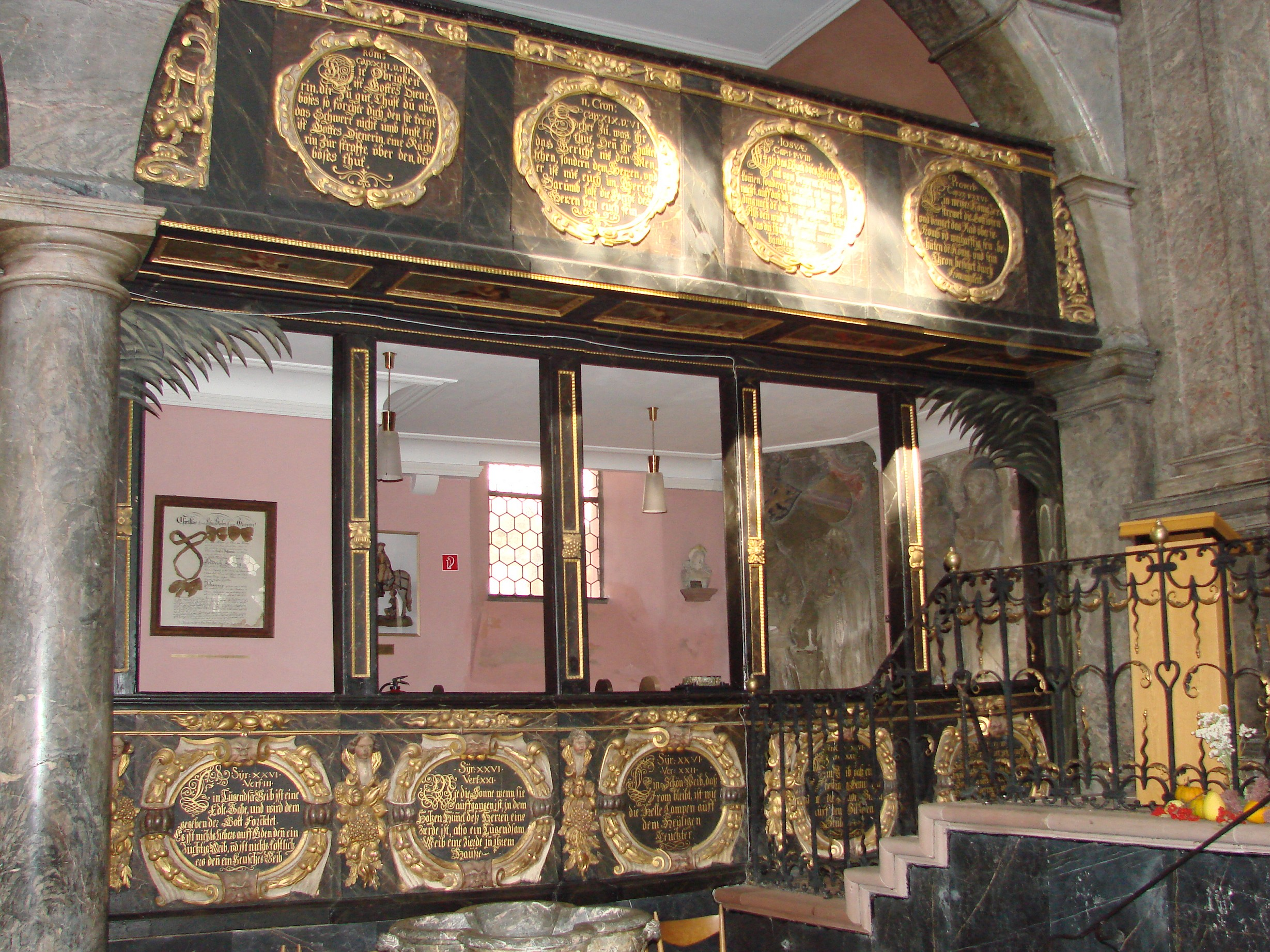
Reiterchörlein

In 1553 Idstein turned Lutheran. The church was decorated in Baroque style in the 17th century, unusually rich for a Protestant church. The ceiling in the main nave was thoroughly covered with large-scale oil paintings from the Dutch school of Rubens. Several well known works by Rubens form the basis of scenes from the life of Christ on the walls and ceiling; for example The Wedding at Cana on the south wall is largely based on Rubens's painting The Feast of Herod which hangs today in the National Gallery of Scotland in Edinburgh.

The church's name refers to the church union declared in Idstein in 1817 whereby the Reformed and Lutheran churches in the Duchy of Nassau united to the Protestant Church in Nassau, today the Protestant Church in Hesse and Nassau.

==== Residence palace ====
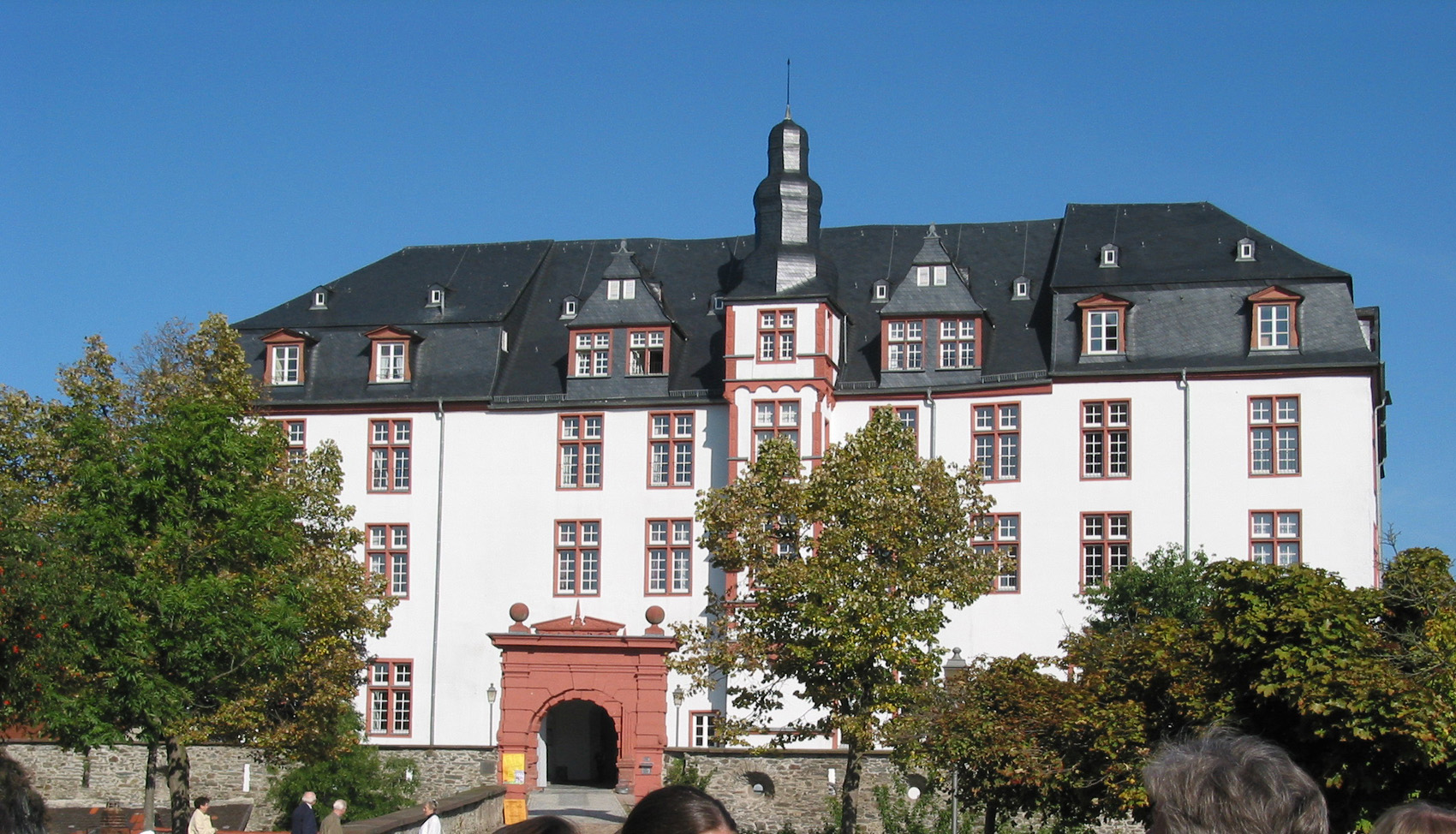
Residenzschloss

The Renaissance-style Schloss was built in 1614–1634 by Jost and Henrich Heer (Höer) for Count Ludwig (d. 1627) and his son Count Johann (d. 1677) by incorporating older building materials. It stands on a craggy massif between the town's two brooks. It is believed that the crags on which the palace is built were already built up in the 11th century.

A bridged gap in the crags separates it from the old castle area from the 11th century; through this gap today runs an important road.

During the time when the last Idstein prince, Georg August Samuel von Nassau-Idstein (1665–1721), was ruling, the building was given its interior design under Maximilian von Welsch's guidance. The now partly missing ceiling stucco was done by Carlo Maria Pozzi. At the main entrance door is a great alliance coat of arms of Count Johann and his consort from about 1635.

The palace has been home to the Pestalozzischule since 1946 and may be visited on guided tours.

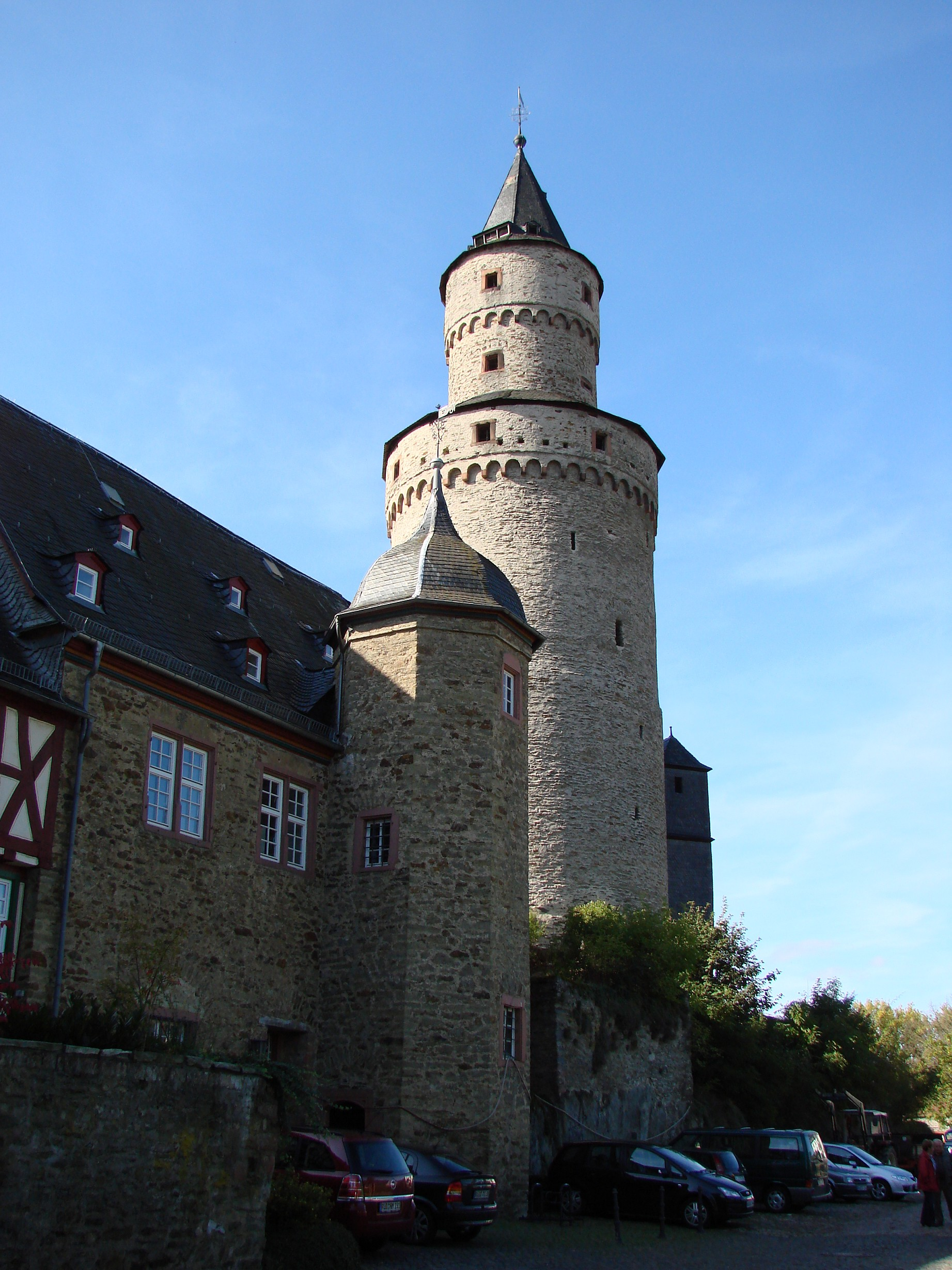
Idstein Castle and Hexenturm

==== Castle and Hexenturm ====
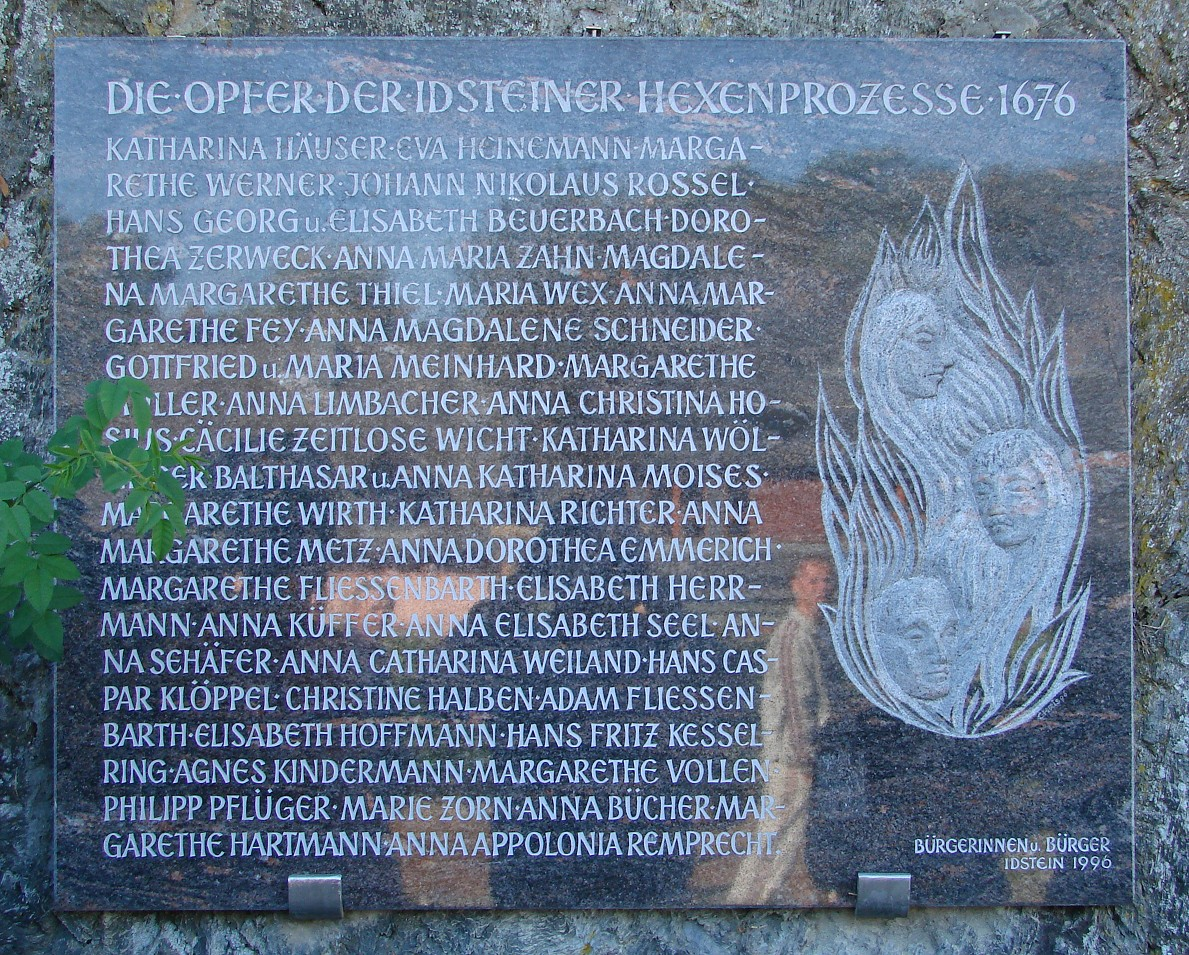
Memorial plaque to the victims of the witch trials

The castle in the area stretching from the gateway arch building on the town side to the bridge over to the Schloss arose between 1497 and 1588. With the remodelling done on the palace itself in the 17th century, this area also underwent far-reaching changes, partly losing its defensive functions, which, it is worth noting, were no longer up to date anyway.

The castle's keep, known as the Hexenturm, 42 m or 138 ft tall, walls more than 3 m or 9.8 ft thick, even given overall diameter of just under 12 m or 39 ft, is Idstein's oldest building. Dendrochronological borings show that work began on the tower as early as 1170 (not, as had long been assumed, about 1350). It received its "butter churn" shape, built in stages, about 1500. (Building researchers see in it a rare time capsule, because in the 20th century, almost nothing was changed beyond the last work in 1963, which entailed nothing more than some new plastering outside and small touch-ups with cement inside).

No witches or warlocks were ever imprisoned in the Hexenturm. However, on a cliff wall at the foot of the keep, a plaque has been placed in memory of those murdered after being accused of witchcraft. Idstein was notorious for its witch trials about 1676.

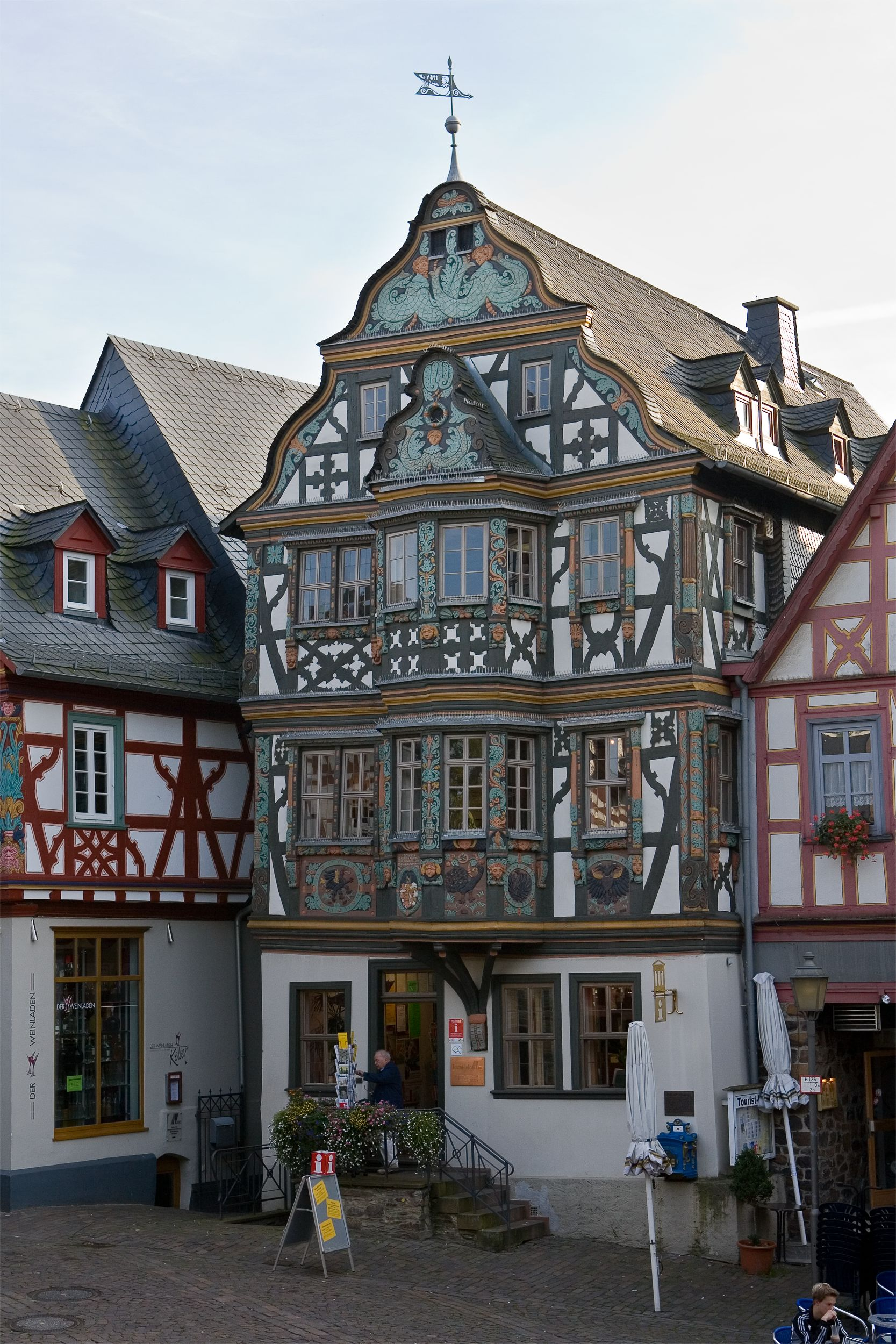
Killingerhaus

==== Other historic buildings ====
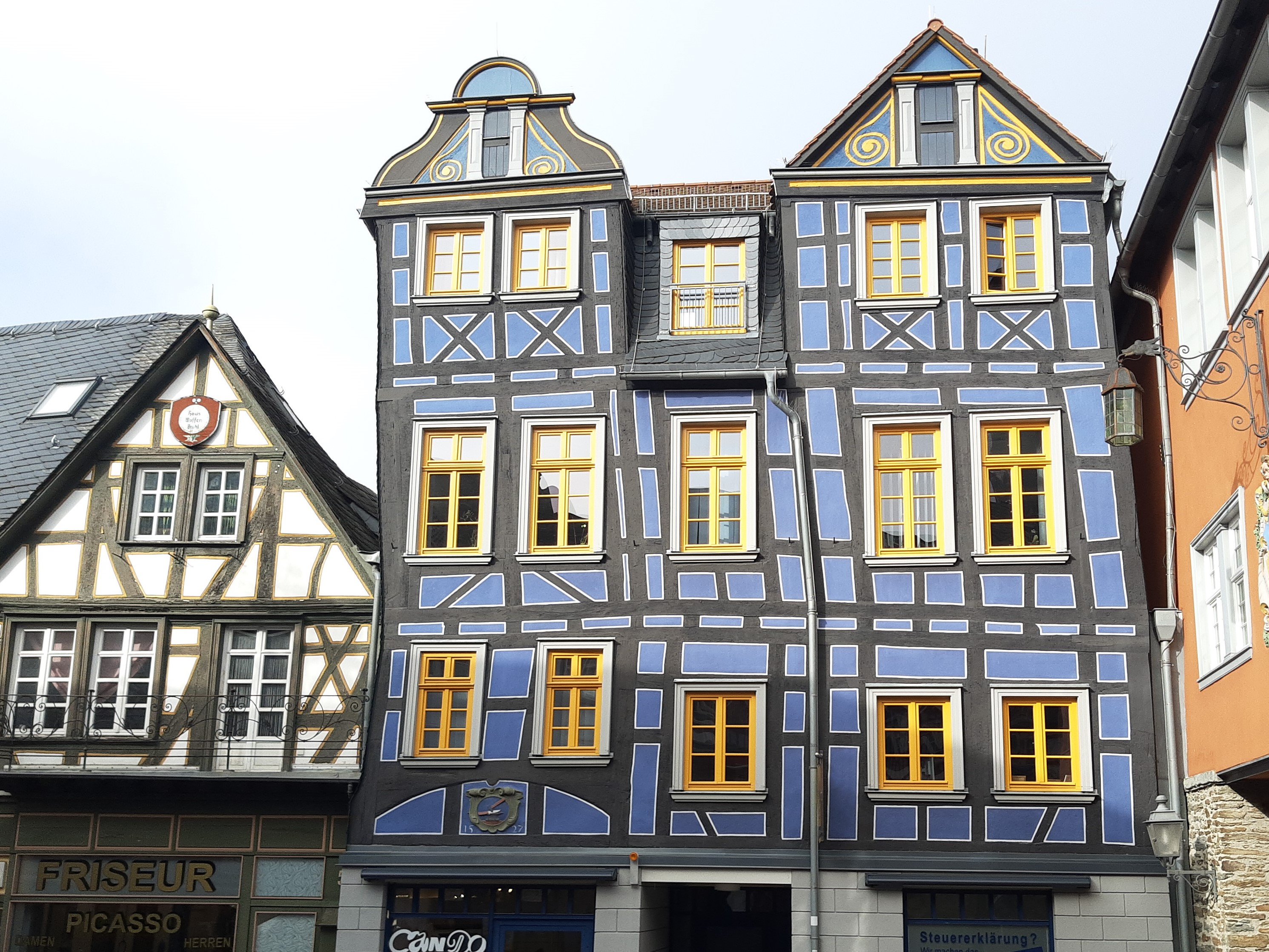
Idstein, Blaues Haus

The old town core is small. It is distinguished by a many timber-frame buildings, some opulently painted and decorated, in which the Rhenish influences on the Hessian-Franconian timber-frame building style can already be seen. Therefore, Idstein is part of the German Framework Road. The town core stretches between the castle area with its Hexenturm and the Höerhof, the representative timber-frame building built in 1620–1626 by the palace building master on the heights across from the Schloss. The painter Ernst Toepfer bought the property in 1911 and restored the building. Today, the Höerhof is a stylish hotel and restaurant with an idyllic inner courtyard.

Right at the Nassau castle's gateway arch building, standing over König-Adolf-Platz, is the Town Hall (Rathaus) from 1698, in a rather odd way over the passage that separates the Old Town from the castle. Also worth mentioning is the carillon (Glockenspiel). A rockslide from the crags destroyed the Town Hall in 1928, but it was rebuilt between 1932 and 1934.

König-Adolf-Platz is seamlessly ringed by representative timber-frame houses, mainly dating from about 1600. To the Town Hall's left stands the Schiefes Haus ("Crooked House"), which was renovated a few years ago, and which Nicolay, the major of the town militia, had built in 1527. On the way out of the square towards the Unionskirche, is the richly adorned Killingerhaus built in 1527, which has served as a museum and tourism office since 1987. It is one of Germany's most important timber-frame houses with regards to art history. According to one story, the building was originally built in Strasbourg, and when the owner moved to Idstein, he brought the house with him.

The rest of the old downtown core is also characterized by its many timber-frame houses and estate complexes from the 16th and 17th centuries, some of which have been lavishly renovated. This is particularly so along the Obergasse ("Upper Lane"), which leads from König-Adolf-Platz out of the town and meets the old town wall on the Höerhof heights. Somewhat below that stands the Stockheimer Hof, which was built in the late 16th century as the seat of the Lords of Stockheim. After they died out, ownership passed to the family von Calm between 1768 and 1776, giving the property on which it stands its current name, Kalmenhof. Until 2005, the timber-frame building was being used by the Sozialpädagogisches Zentrum SPZ Kalmenhof. On the way from the Killingerhaus to the Höerhof, one house has a humorous Dog Latin inscription. "Sita vsvilate inis taberce inis" (which is actually a misspelling of Sieht aus wie Latein, ist aber keines – "Looks like Latin, but is not").

As a last witness to the former leather industry, the Gerberhaus ("Tanners' House") stands at Löherplatz below the Unionskirche; it is the former storage shed on the Wörsbach. Löherplatz was, beginning in the Middle Ages the place where the tanneries and leather processing works were found owing to the demand for water, and also the need to have the works outside town given the attendant stench that went forth from them. The Gerberhaus, after a thorough renovation, nowadays serves as an exhibition and cabaret event venue.

Stretching east of the old town core from the marketplace, which itself dates from about 1700, is a Baroque town expansion. Its streets match the ideals of town building at that time with right-angled intersections, the timber-frame houses lining them pragmatic and far less decorated than in the town core. Building "sins" and great changes have been avoided, and instead, restoration is what was more often done, thereby preserving an impressive, unbroken ensemble of these buildings.

==== St. Martin ====
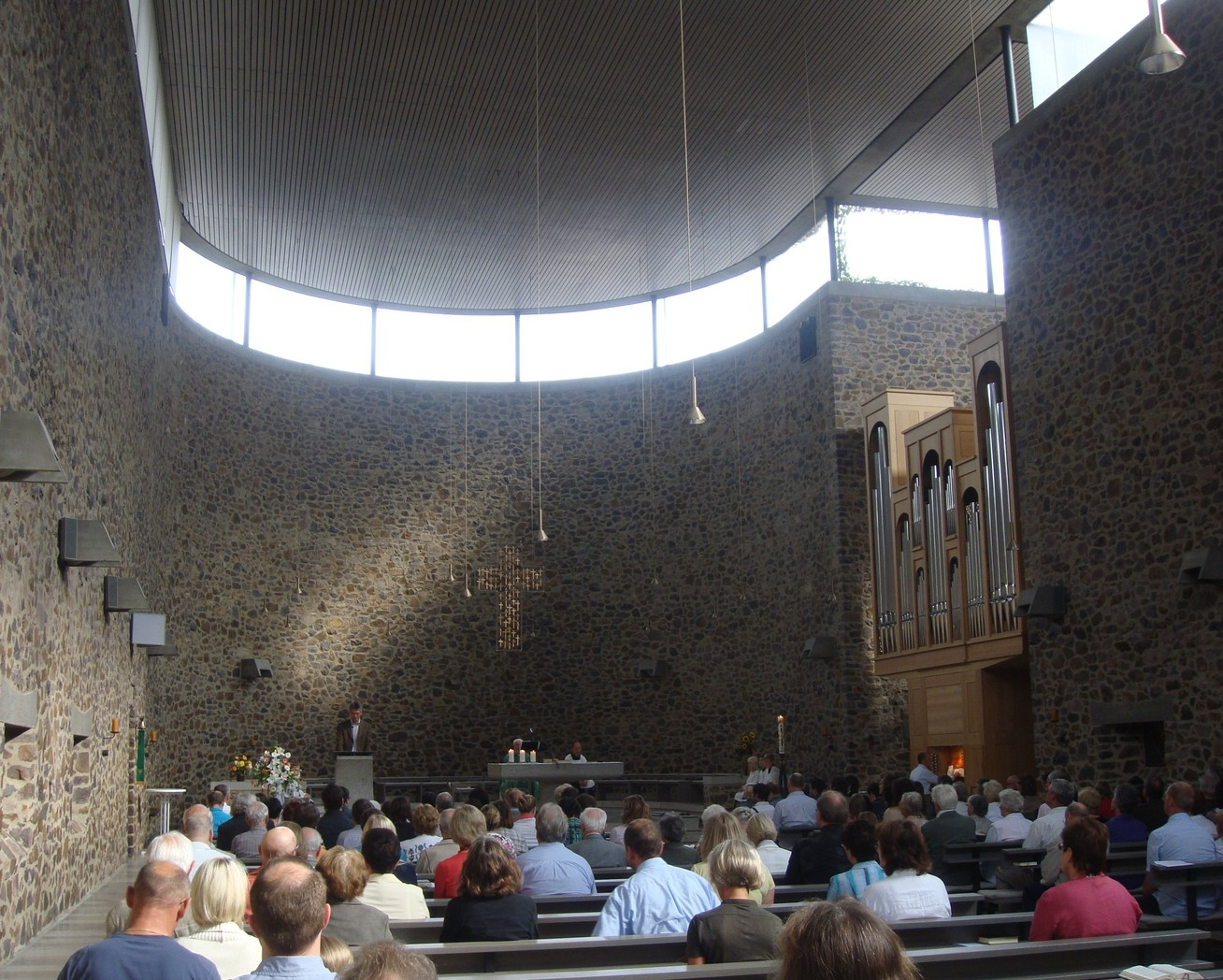
Service in St. Martin, 2011

As the former neogothic Catholic parish church St. Magdalena was too small for a growing population after World War II, a new church St. Martin was built instead, designed by the architect Johannes Krahn, resembling a Roman basilica with open sandstone walls and a band of windows below the ceiling, consecrated in 1964. In 2006 a new organ was installed by Orgelbau Mebold.

=== Limes ===
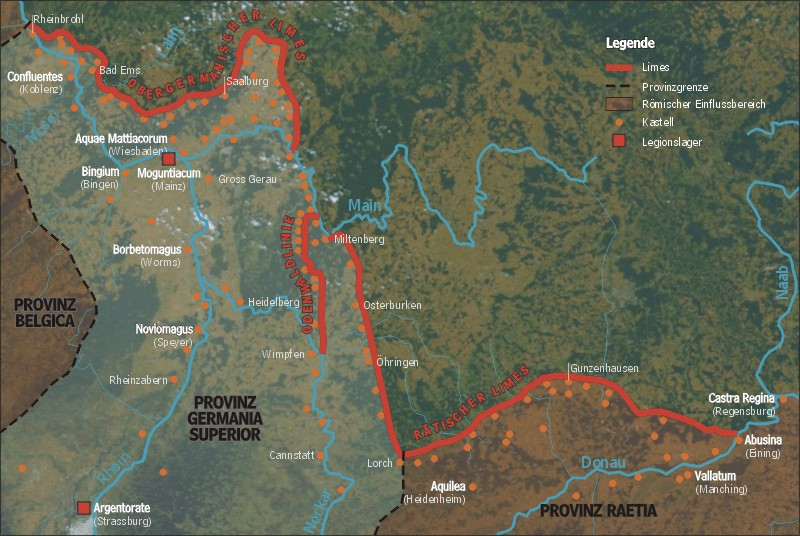
Map of Upper Germanic Limes

The municipal area was crossed by the Limes Germanicus, a line of frontier forts begun in AD 86 by the Romans which stretched from near Bonn on the Rhine to near Regensburg on the Danube. It divided the Roman Empire from the unconquered Germanic tribes. The area of the town that stands today lay on the Germanic side. Bearing obvious witness to the Limes is a replica of a watchtower towards Niedernhausen near Dasbach on the Dasbacher Höhe (heights). Even the Dasbach churchtower supposedly stands on the foundation of a Roman watchtower. Within the limits of neighbouring Taunusstein is likewise found such a replica near Orlen, right beside the remains of the castrum Zugmantel.

Near the outlying centre of Heftrich stood the castrum Alteburg, of which, however, nothing more is to be seen.

On 15 July 2005, the Upper-Germanic-Rhaetian Limes (the Limes Germanicus) was raised to World Heritage Site by UNESCO.

=== War cemetery ===
During the Second World War there were two reserve hospitals in Idstein – one in the castle and one in the Kalmenhof. When, towards the end of the war, it was no longer possible to transfer people who had died in the hospital to their hometowns, they were buried in the Idstein cemetery. After the end of the war, the Volksbund Deutsche Kriegsgräberfürsorge built a central memorial in Idstein, where all war dead from the district of Untertaunus were to be reburied.

There are a total of 250 graves on the Idstein war cemetery. Of those buried there, 234 people are known by name. 10 dead are civilians. There are also six graves with fallen soldiers and Russian prisoners of war from the First World War. Most of the dead at the Idstein war cemetery died after the fighting ended. There is evidence that prisoners from the Rhine meadow camps ("Rheinwiesenlager") came to the Idstein military hospitals.

=== Regular events ===
As a yearly event highlight, the Hessen-Jazz Festival or more recently Idstein JazzFestival has been drawing thousands of visitors for 20 years into the Old Town's laneways. On three days, during the first weekend in the Hesse summer holidays, up to 75 different jazz groups on a dozen stages play from Friday evening to Sunday live in an open-air concert.

The Unionskirche is the location for choral concerts of the Idsteiner Kantorei conducted by Carsten Koch twice a year, such as Orff's Carmina Burana and Bach's Weihnachtsoratorium in 2009. For the annual European Heritage Days the "Nassauische Kammerphilharmonie" has performed a Sinfoniekonzert on the occasion of the Tag des offenen Denkmals, including a series of Beethoven's symphonies. The Rheingau Musik Festival staged concerts here with Elizabeth Parcells, Chanticleer and ensemble amarcord, among others.

In the church St. Martin an annual choral concert is performed by the combined choirs Chor St. Martin and the chamber choir Martinis, conducted by Franz Fink, such as Bach's St Matthew Passion in 1998 with Elisabeth Scholl, Andreas Scholl and Max van Egmond and again in 2009 with Andreas Pruys and Klaus Mertens. The concert of 2011 was Handel's Messiah, with soloists Katia Plaschka, Andreas Scholl, Ulrich Cordes and Markus Flaig. Other concerts in the church have included music of Graham Waterhouse, the duo propram of Giora Feidman and organist Matthias Eisenberg in 2008 and a concert of Kalevi Kiviniemi in 2010.

Although the town of Idstein hosts only a small vineyard, whose wines are not for sale but poured at special occasions, there is nonetheless a yearly wine festival, mainly presenting wines from the near Rheingau.

Every other year, in the spring, the Idsteiner Hexenmarkt (Witches' Market) is held in the castle and palace area, an event with medieval crafts and entertainment.

In the summer, from June to August on the third day of each of those months, the Alteburger Markt is held in Idstein-Heftrich, on the site of the Roman castrum Alteburg.

The youth centre in Idstein offers a monthly event plan with hip hop, metal, DJ night and punk rock, offering at irregular intervals, for instance live concerts by local bands.

Since 2003, the "Monkey Jump Festival" has been held annually. A great number of bands perform in the town's various pubs and restaurants during the festival.

Since 2004, the Idstein Women's Day Frauen in Balance ("Women in Balance") has been held annually at the Gerberhaus, in collaboration with the Rheingau-Taunus-Kreis equality commissioner.

== Notable people ==
=== Sons and daughters of the town ===
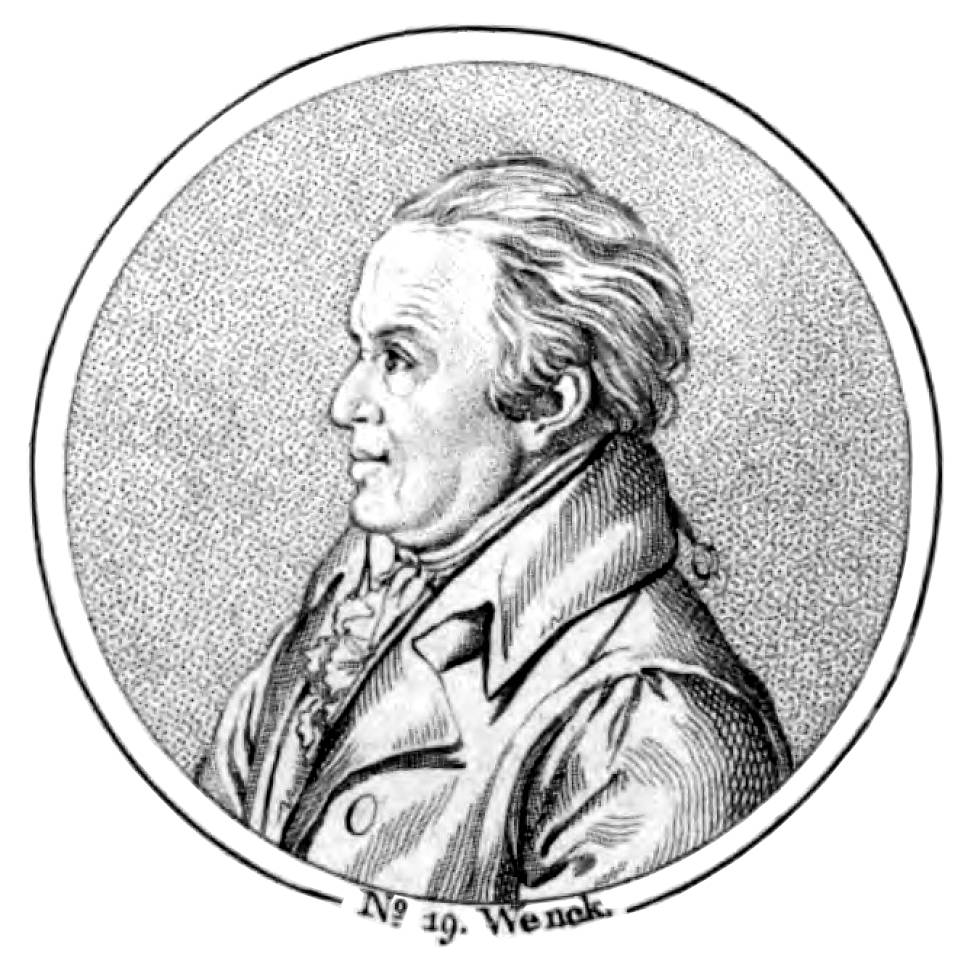
Friedrich August Wilhelm Wenck (1810)

- Ferdinand Abt (1877–1962), sculptor
- Johann Andreas Benignus Bergsträsser (1732–1812), entomologist and Rector of the University of Hanover
- Carl Jakob Frankenbach (1861–1937), painter and illustrator
- Henriette Maria Luise von Hayn (1722–1782), poet
- Patrick van Hecke, alias Dirrrty Franz, namesake of the German crunk group Dirrrty Franz & die B-Side Boyz
- Karl Hill (1831–1893), operatic baritone, who created Klingsor in Parsifal in Bayreuth
- Wilhelm August Kobbé (1802–1881), diplomat
- Henriette Charlotte of Nassau-Idstein (1693–1734), consort of Maurice Wilhelm, Duke of Saxe-Merseburg
- Helfrich Bernhard Wenck (1739–1803), historian and educator
- Friedrich August Wilhelm Wenck (1741–1810), historian

=== People connected with Idstein ===
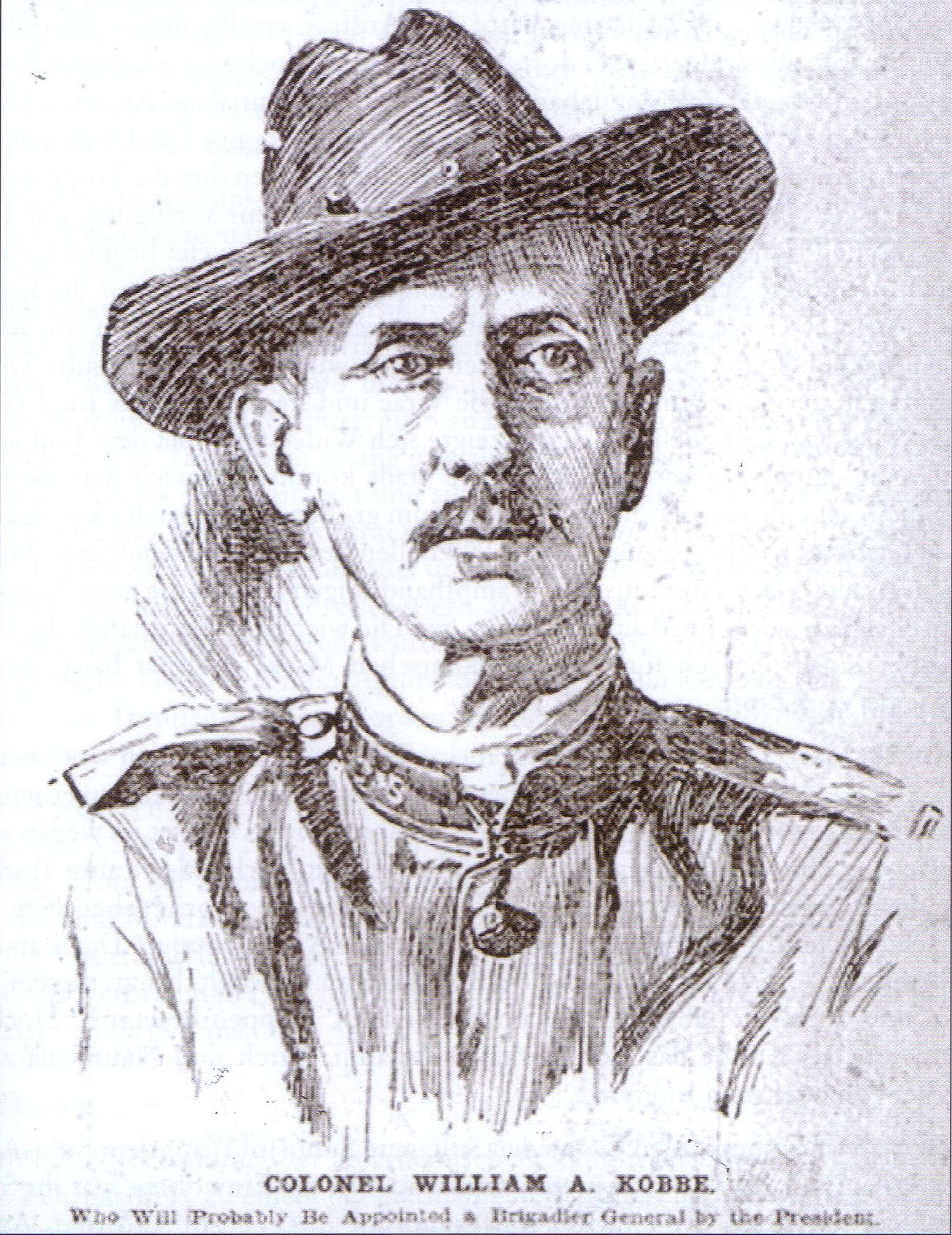
William August Kobbé (1900)

- Adolf of Nassau (c. 1255–1298), used Idstein Castle as one of his two main residences before 1292, when he became King of the Romans
- Arnold I, Count of Laurenburg (died c. 1148), was from 1124 Vogt of Idstein
- Johann Baptist Friedrich Anton von Franqué (1796–1865), physician
- Wilhelm Fresenius (1913–2004), chemist and industrialist
- Imagina of Isenburg-Limburg (c. 1255–1313), was the consort of Adolf of Nassau
- William August Kobbé (1840–1931), U.S. Army general, was the son of Wilhelm Kobbé, born in Idstein
- Gustav Kobbé (1857–1918), American author of The Complete Opera Book, was another son of Wilhelm Kobbé
- Christiane Kohl, soprano, grew up in Idstein
- Karlhans Krohn (1908–2003), sport teacher; popularizer of the game peteca, spent his later years in Idstein
- Karl Christian von Langsdorf, mathematician, geologist, and engineer, attended the Gymnasium in Idstein
- Wolf Meyer-Erlach (1891–1982), theologian, college teacher, university rector; 1951–1963 parish administrator in Idstein-Wörsdorf
- Sebastian Stoskopff (1597–1657), Alsatian painter, lived and died in Idstein
- Werner Schuster (1939–2001), physician, health informatics specialist and politician
- Ernst Toepfer (1877–1955), painter, lived for parts of his life in Idstein and died there

=== Honorary citizens ===
- Erivan Haub (born 1932), owner of the Tengelmann Group, lived for some years in Idstein. nominated 2008
- Hermann Müller (1935–2013), former mayor of Idstein
