= Idstein Castle =

Castle in Hesse, Germany

- Burg Idstein; Schloss Idstein
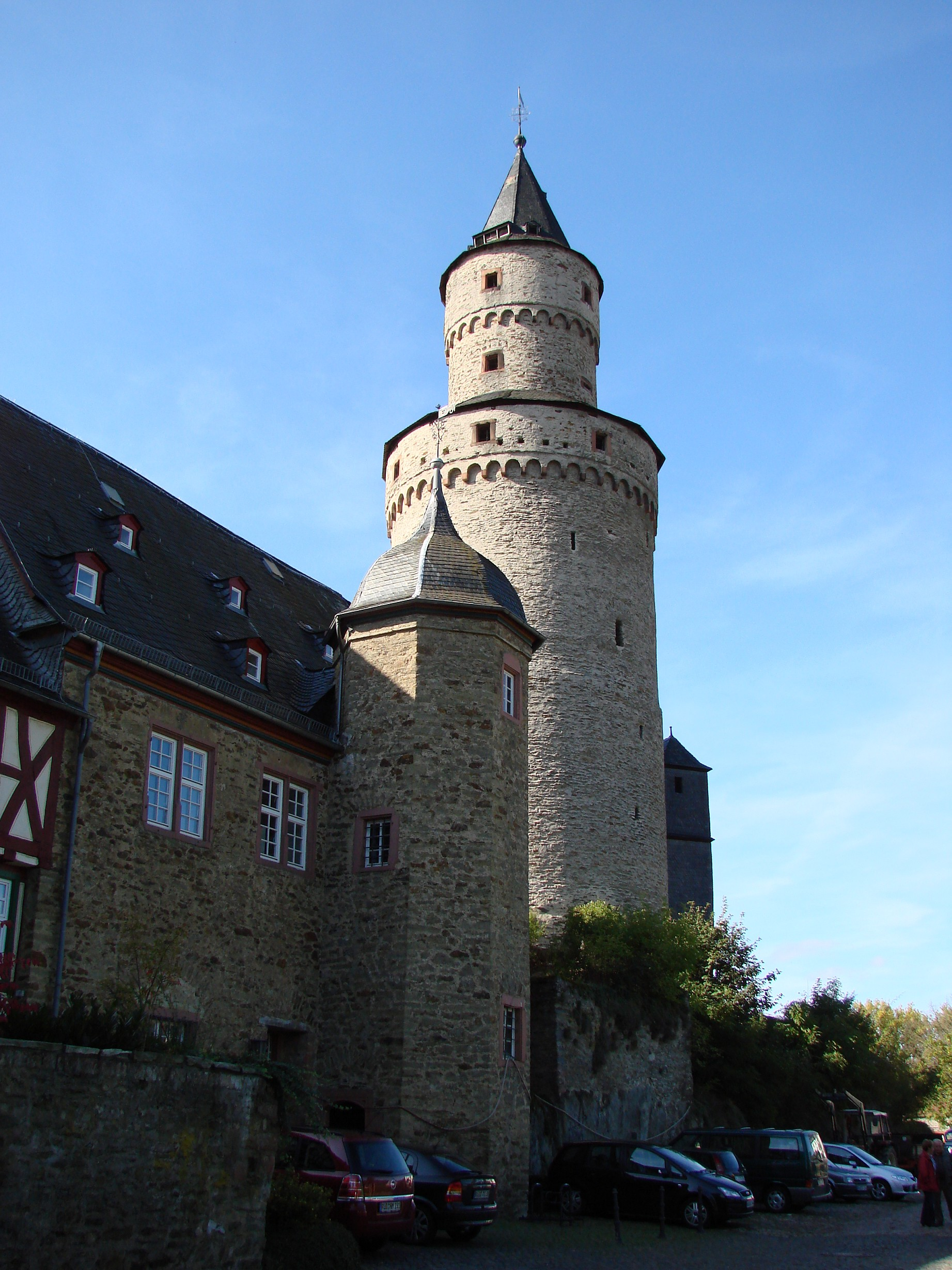
- Castle building and Hexenturm
- Interactive map of the Idstein Castle area

General information
- Type: Hill castle; Village site
- Architectural style: Medieval; Renaissance
- Location: Idstein, Hesse, Germany
- Coordinates: 50.2219°N 8.2688°E
- Groundbreaking: c. 1070

Idstein Castle (German: Burg Idstein), later the Renaissance style Schloss Idstein, is located in Idstein in the county of Rheingau-Taunus, Germany. The hill castle was the residenz of the counts of Nassau-Idstein. The castle's Witches' Tower (Hexenturm) is one of the town's oldest buildings and a substantial local landmark.

== History ==
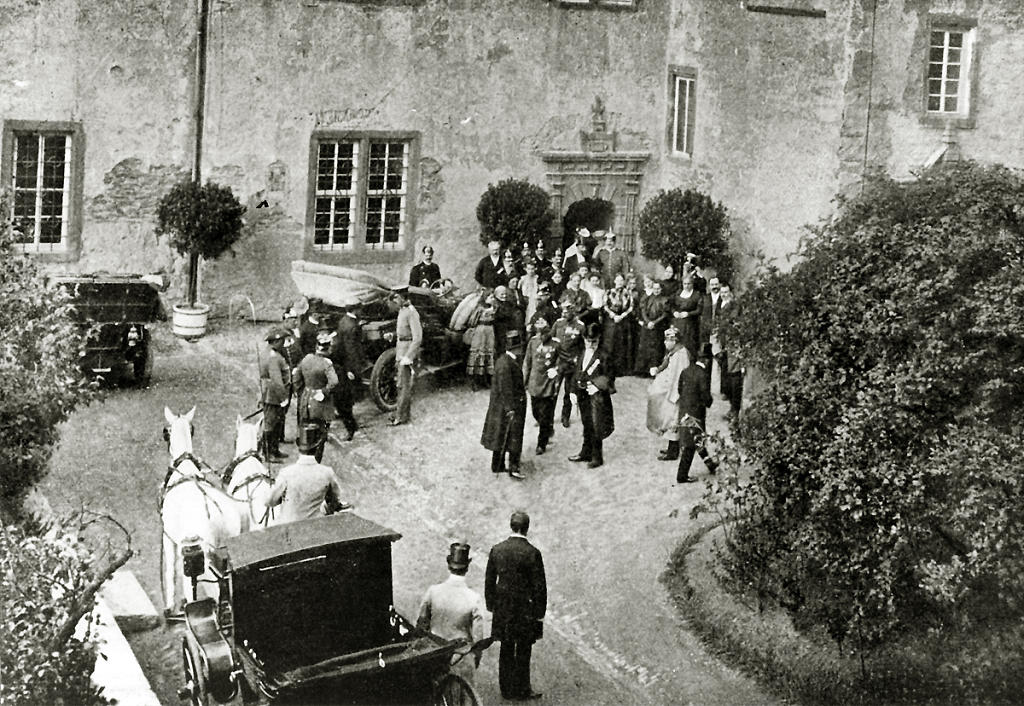
Inauguration of the Convalescent Home for Members of the Royal Prussian Army in the schloss by Minister of War Karl von Einem in 1905

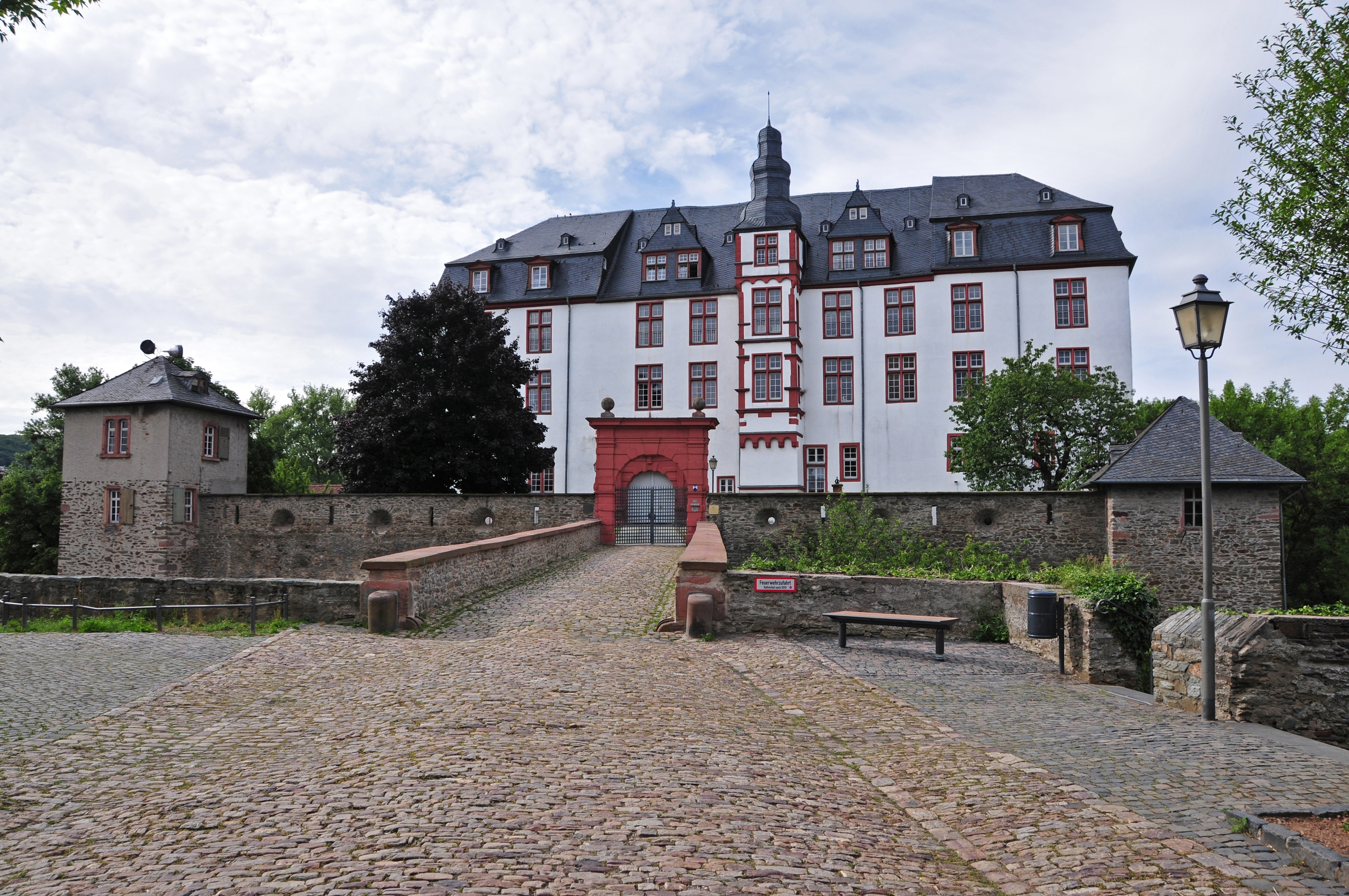
The Residenz

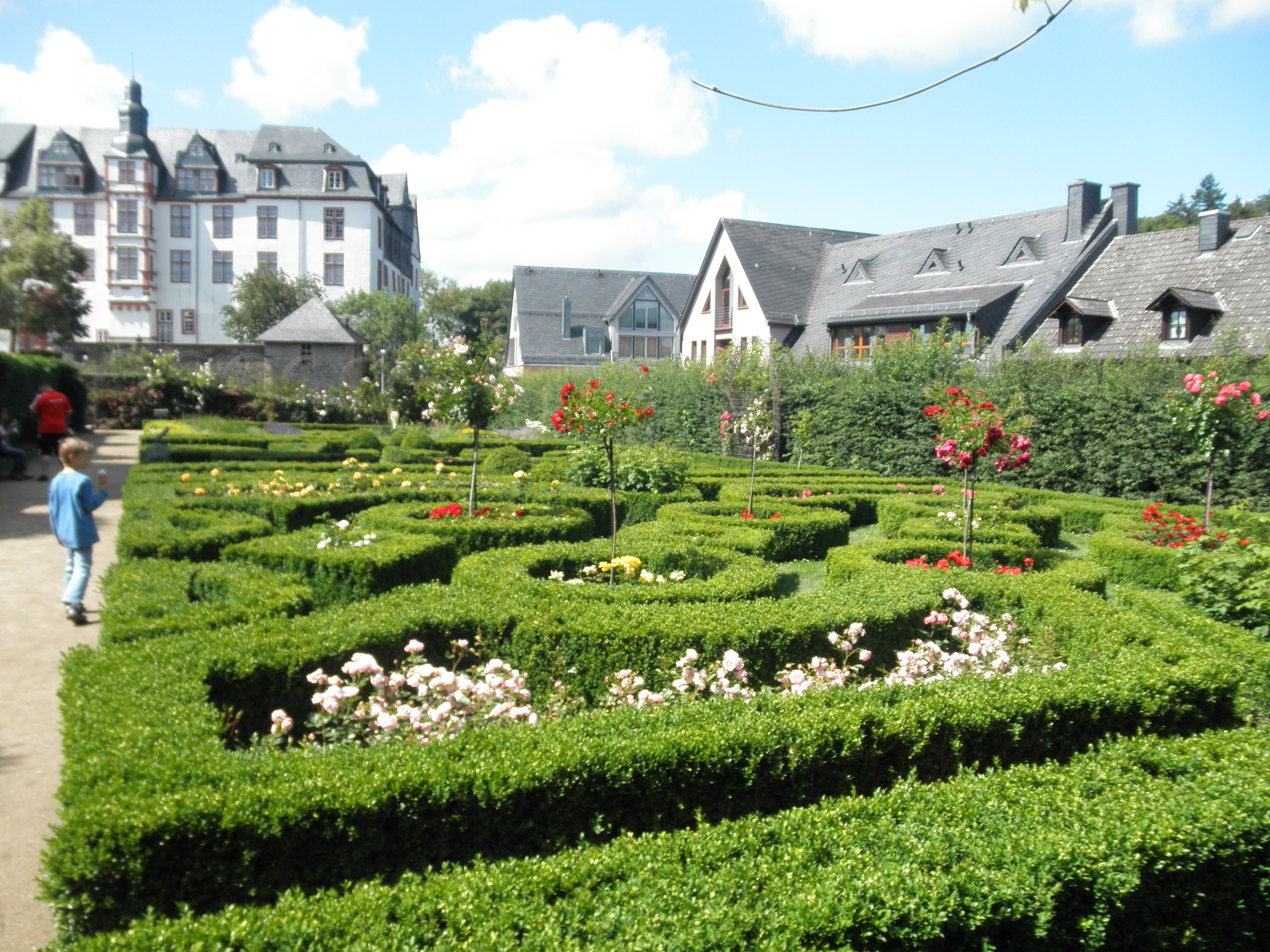
The Schlossgarten

The original castle of Idstein was built around 1170 on a rocky ridge in the centre of the Old Town. Within the inner bailey, only the bergfried, the old district courthouse, the 15th century gatehouse and the palas have survived from the castle.

In the early 17th century, during the time of Prince George Augustus Samuel of Nassau-Idstein, a Renaissance style schloss was built on the site of the outer ward. Its Baroque interior was completed around 1714. The architect was Maximilian von Welsch, the stucco work, especially in the so-called Emperor Chamber (Kaisergemach), was carried out by Carlo Maria Pozzi. The ceiling paintings and other paintings were by Valentin David Albrecht and Luca Antonio Colomba.

In 1905 the schloss became a Convalescent Home for Members of the Royal Prussian Army.

The upper bailey was demolished and the bergfried was nicknamed Hexenturm (Witches' Tower) in the 19th century. There were witch trials in the early modern period in Idstein, but these substantially predate the name of this landmark. It is unlikely that anyone was ever accused or imprisoned in the tower for witchcraft. The nickname became widespread around 1900 with the publication of Die Pfarrfrau von Heftrich by Ottokar Schupp. The Hexenturm became the landmark of Idstein. At the base of the tower is a plaque in memory of the victims of the witch trials of 1676, listing the names of 31 women and 8 men killed at the end of the rule of John, Count of Nassau-Idstein.

After the First World War, French soldiers were housed in the schloss during the French occupation. In the Second World War, the schloss acted as a military hospital for reserves.

Today the castle houses the Idstein Pestalozzi Gymnasium. Both schloss and bergfried may be visited on request.

A 20-metre-long stone bridge spans the neck ditch between the outer and inner baileys. To its right is a small Renaissance garden. Guided tours are offered with the guides dressed as gardeners of 1702.

== Literature ==
- Rudolf Knappe: Mittelalterliche Burgen in Hessen. 800 Burgen, Burgruinen und Burgstätten. Wartberg, Gudensberg, 2000, ISBN 3-86134-228-6, pp. 461ff.
- Schlösser, Burgen, alte Mauern. Herausgegeben vom Hessendienst der Staatskanzlei, Wiesbaden, 1990, ISBN 3-89214-017-0, p. 197
- Der Idsteiner Hexenturm Magistrat der Stadt Idsten (publ.), Rimac Verlag, Idstein, 2008
