= Christuskirche, Walsdorf =

Protestant church in Germany

Christuskirche
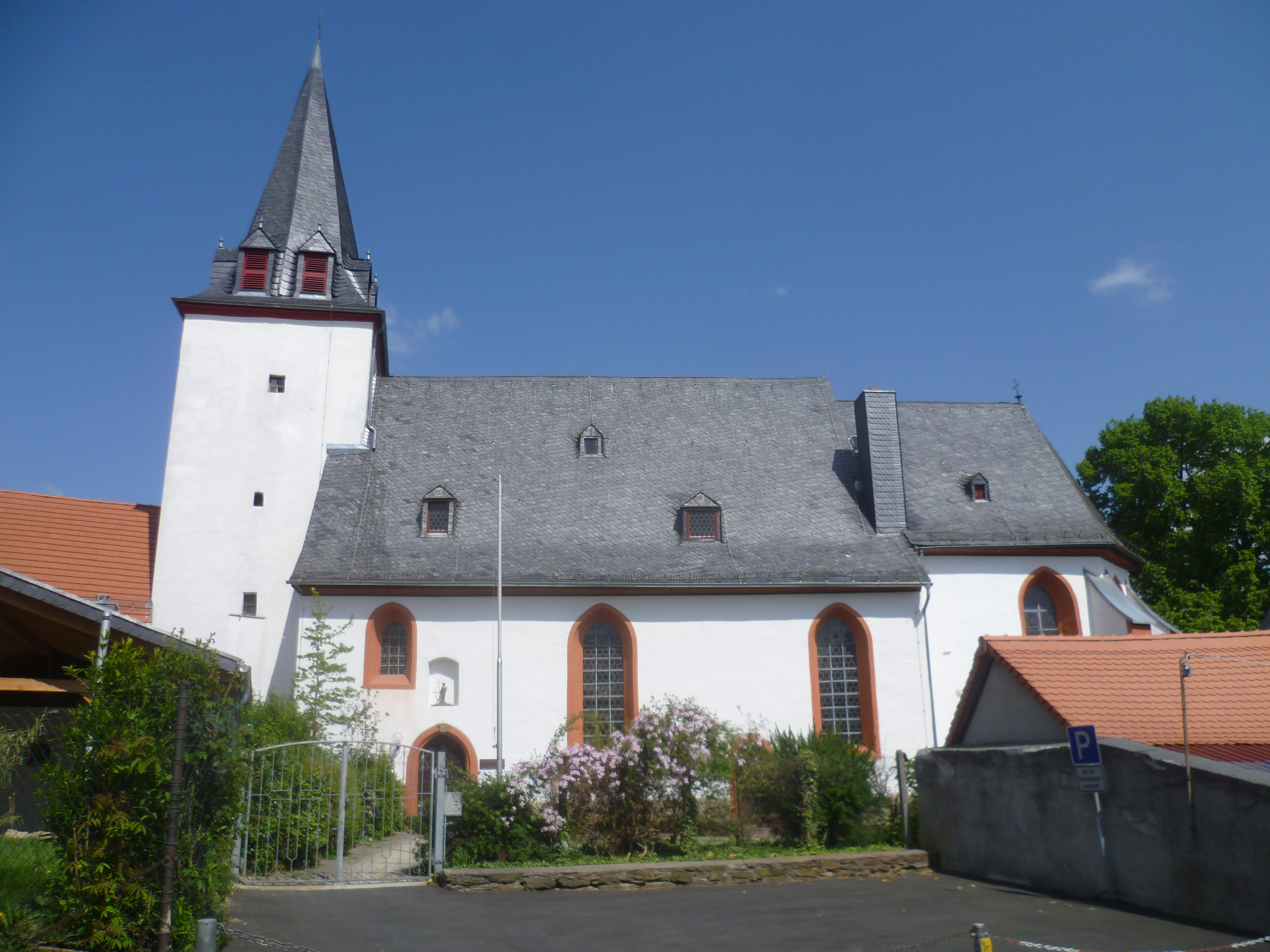

Religion
- Affiliation: Protestant Church in Hesse and Nassau
- Ecclesiastical or organizational status: Parish church

Location
- Location: Idstein-Walsdorf, Hesse, Germany
- Interactive map of Christuskirche
- Coordinates: 50°16′22.6″N 08°16′44.4″E

Architecture
- Style: Gothic; Baroque (Interior)
- Completed: 1663

Website
- www.walsdorf-christuskirche.de

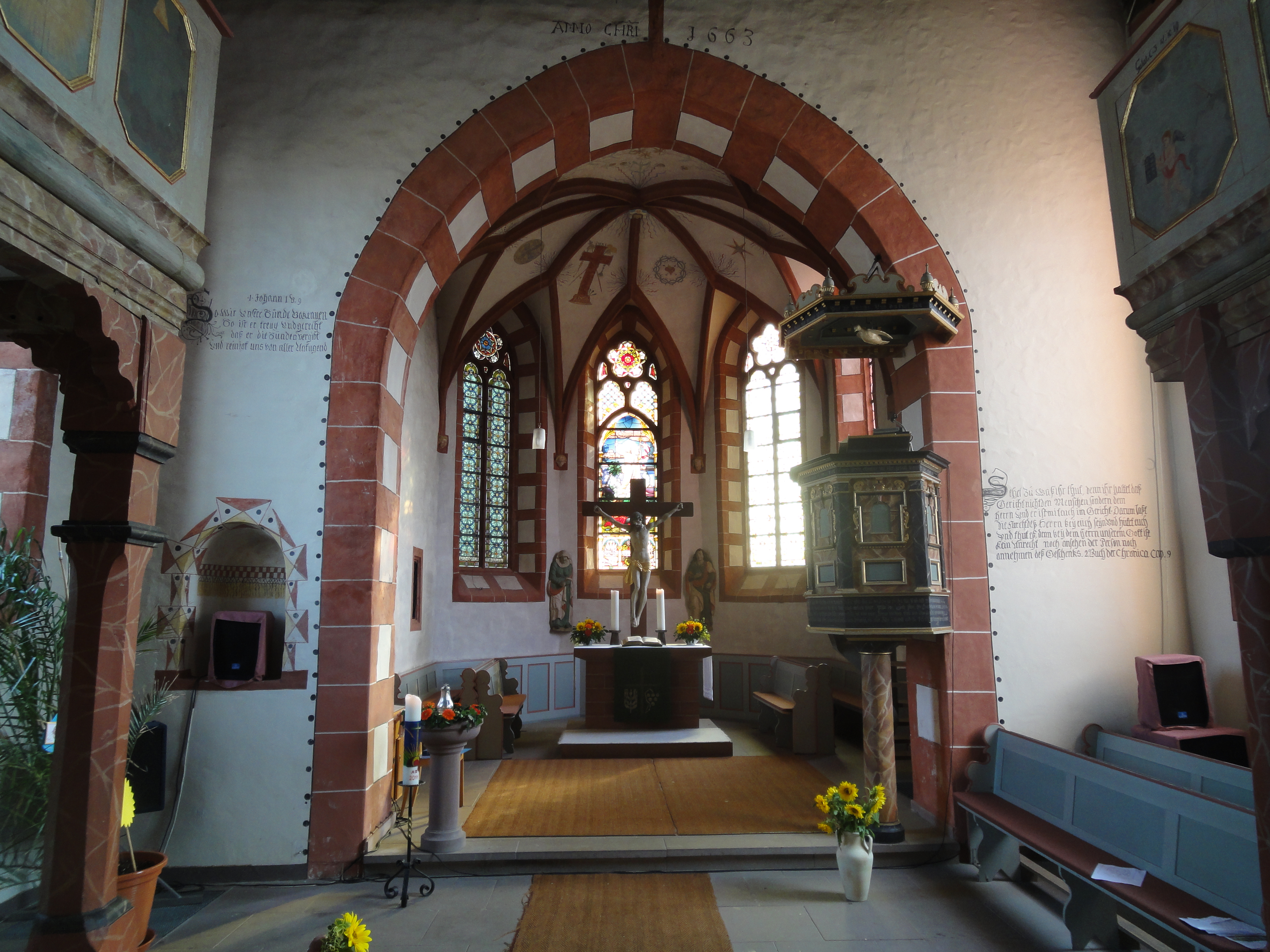
The choir

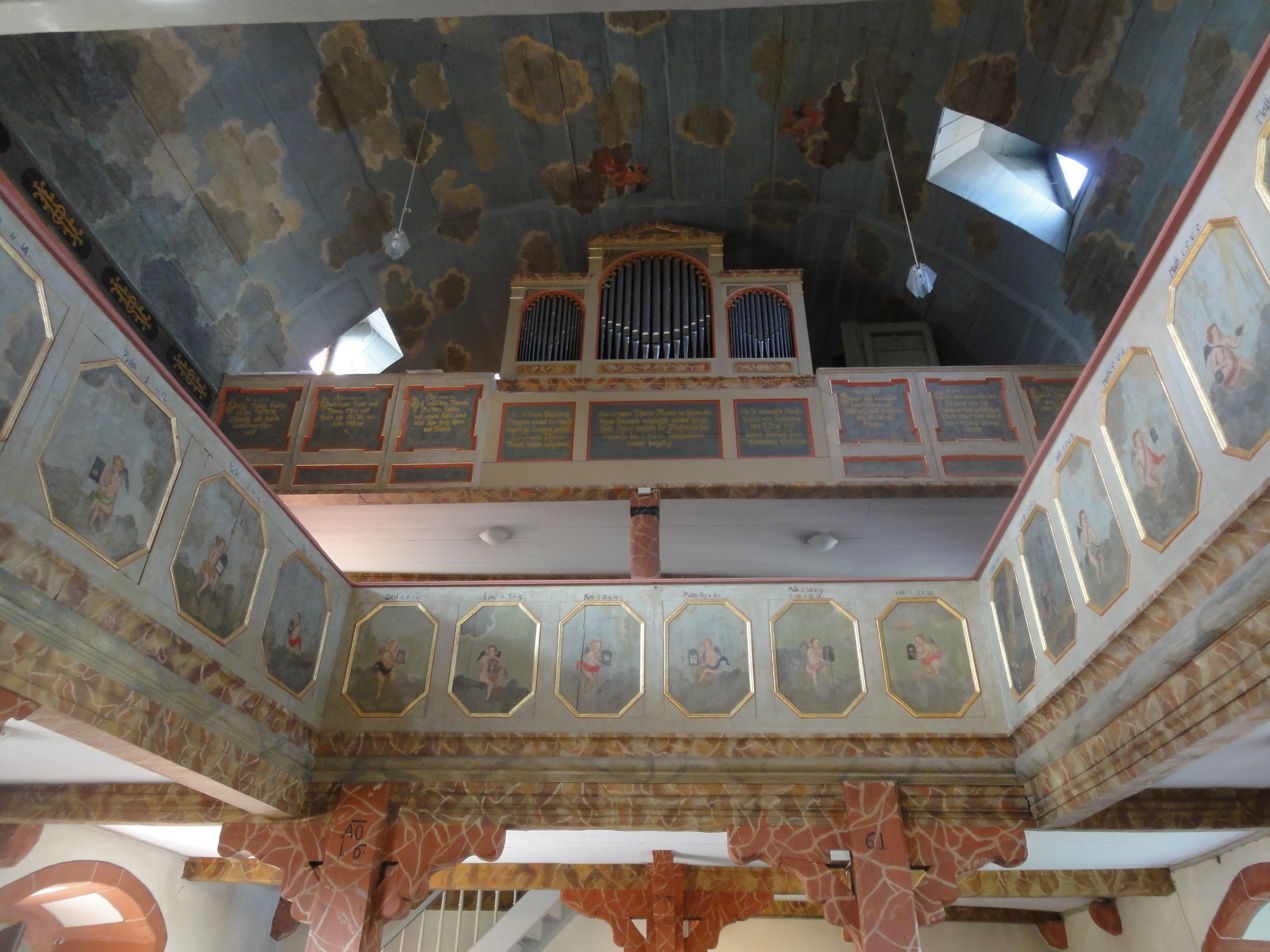
Ceiling and organ

The Christuskirche (Christ Church) in Walsdorf, now part of Idstein, Hesse, Germany, is a Protestant church built in 1652 to 1663. It restored the structure of an older church which burnt down in 1644 during the Thirty Years' War. It features mainly Gothic architecture with some Romanesque elements, and its interior was fashioned in Baroque style, with a balcony and a ceiling painting. Stained glass windows were added in the 19th century. The church received its name in 1993, 600 years after the mentioning of a chapel. It is a listed building.

== History ==
A monastery of Benedictines was built in Walsdorf in the middle of the 12th century. A chapel dedicated to Mary was first mentioned in 1393. The parish was assigned to Camberg. The chapel probably stood on a rock, as part of the monastery. St. Vincent was mentioned as the patron saint in 1456.

The parish became Lutheran during the Reformation in the 1540s. It separated from Camberg and had its own pastor. In 1644, Walsdorf and its church were devastated by fire, caused by Bavarian soldiers during the Thirty Years' War. The church was rebuilt from 1652 to 1663. A ceiling painting by Veit Graf was completed in 1660, with references to Luther's Small Catechism. An organ was installed in 1697. A crucifixion group, the altar and furnishings from the 17th and 18th centuries were donations from Walsdorf citizens. In 1803, colourful glass windows were donated by Hermann Düssel, created by Centner from Wiesbaden. The organ was replaced in 1858 by an instrument built by Gustav Raßmann. The three bells date back to 1716, 1746 or 1763, and 1920.

The church was renovated again in 1934, and from 1966 to 1970. During the latter restoration, Baroque paintings were discovered at the organ and the balconies, and restored. The church was named Christuskirche on the occasion of the 600th anniversary in 1993. It is a listed building.
