= Christian II of Saxe-Merseburg =

Christian II
- Duke of Saxe-Merseburg
- Born: 19 November 1653; Merseburg
- Died: 20 October 1694 (aged 40); Merseburg
- Spouse: Erdmuthe Dorothea of Saxe-Zeitz
- Issue Detail: Christian III Maurice, Duke of Saxe-Merseburg; Maurice Wilhelm, Duke of Saxe-Merseburg
- House: House of Wettin
- Father: Christian I, Duke of Saxe-Merseburg
- Mother: Christiana of Schleswig-Holstein-Sonderburg-Glücksburg

Christian II of Saxe-Merseburg (19 November 1653 – 20 October 1694), was a duke of Saxe-Merseburg and member of the House of Wettin.

He was the second (but eldest surviving) son of Christian I, Duke of Saxe-Merseburg, and Christiana of Schleswig-Holstein-Sonderburg-Glücksburg.

== Life ==
The death of his older brother Johann Georg on 3 January 1654 made him the new heir of the duchy of Saxe-Merseburg. Christian succeeded his father when he died, on 18 October 1691.

Christian II's short reign had little impact on the history of the duchy. In fact, he is only remembered today for one of the obelisks in the gardens of Castle Merseburg, where he appears together with his wife.

== Marriage and issue ==
In Moritzburg an der Elster on 14 October 1679, Christian married his paternal cousin, Princess Erdmuthe Dorothea of Saxe-Zeitz. They had seven children:

1. Christian III Maurice, Duke of Saxe-Merseburg (b. Merseburg, 7 November 1680 – d. Merseburg, 14 November 1694).
2. Johann Wilhelm (b. Merseburg, 11 October 1681 – d. Merseburg, 29 May 1685) died in early childhood.
3. August Frederick (b. Delitzsch, 10 March 1684 – d. Merseburg, 13 August 1685) died in infancy.
4. Philipp Ludwig (b. Merseburg, 3 November 1686 – d. Merseburg, 9 June 1688) died in early childhood.
5. Maurice Wilhelm, Duke of Saxe-Merseburg (b. Merseburg, 5 February 1688 – d. Merseburg, 21 April 1731).
6. Frederick Erdmann (b. Merseburg, 20 September 1691 – d. Köthen, 2 June 1714), married on 15 February 1714 to Eleonore Wilhelmine of Anhalt-Köthen. The union lasted only four months and was childless.
7. Christiane Eleonore Dorothea (b. Merseburg, 6 November 1692 – d. Merseburg, 30 March 1693) died in early childhood.

Christian II of Saxe-Merseburg House of Wettin Born: 19 November 1653 Died: 20 October 1694
Preceded by Christian I	Duke of Saxe-Merseburg; 1691–1694	Succeeded by Christian III
