= Maurice Wilhelm, Duke of Saxe-Merseburg =

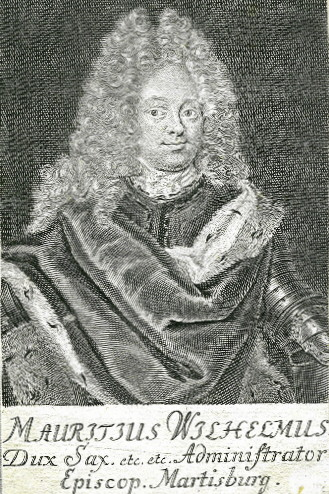
Maurice Wilhelm, Duke of Saxe-Merseburg

Maurice Wilhelm, Duke of Saxe-Merseburg (5 February 1688 – 21 April 1731) was a duke of Saxe-Merseburg and member of the House of Wettin.

He was born in Merseburg, the fifth (but second surviving) son of Christian II, Duke of Saxe-Merseburg, and Erdmuthe Dorothea of Saxe-Zeitz.

== Life ==
Maurice Wilhelm succeeded his older brother Christian III Maurice, Duke of Saxe-Merseburg, when he died on 14 November 1694 after only twenty-five days of rule. As he was only six years of age at the time, his mother, the dowager duchess Erdmuthe Dorothea, acted as regent until he reached his majority in 1712. Until then, the administration of the duchy was supervised by the Elector Frederick Augustus I of Saxony. The custody of the young duke, whoever, was actually in the hands of the dowager duchess Erdmuthe Dorothea, who took an interest in the government of the duchy until 1709, and his uncle August, Duke of Saxe-Merseburg-Zörbig.

An enthusiastic violinist, he was known as the "Geigenherzog" (the violinist duke).

== Marriage and issue ==
In Idstein on 4 November 1711, Maurice Wilhelm married Henriette Charlotte of Nassau-Idstein. They only had one daughter:

1. Fredericka Ulrike (b. and d. Merseburg, 23 June 1720).

After his death at Merseburg, without male issue, he was succeeded by his uncle Heinrich.

== Notes ==
Preceded by Christian III	Duke of Saxe-Merseburg; 1694–1731	Succeeded by Heinrich
