= Hermann Müller (politician, born 1935) =

German politician (1935–2013)

- Born: 17 October 1935; Fachbach, Germany
- Died: 31 December 2013 (aged 78); Wiesbaden
- Occupation: Mayor of Idstein

Hermann Müller (17 October 1935 – 31 December 2013) was a German politician (CDU), who served from 1978 to 2002 as mayor of Idstein. During his four terms, he worked for restoration of the town's framework houses, creation of a pedestrian area, building of a hall as a cultural centre and construction of bypass roads. In 2002, he won the festival Hessentag for Idstein, improving the infrastructure further.

== Political career ==
Born in Fachbach, Müller was from 1960 to 1964 a member of the Kreistag (district government) of the Untertaunuskreis, from 1964 to 1974 a member of its Kreisausschuss. From 1971, he was president of the CDU fraction. From 1968 to 1974, he also worked as a member of the Vertreterversammlung der Planungsgemeinschaft Rhein-Main-Taunus, a planning assembly of the region. From 1989, he was member of the Kreistag of the new Rheingau-Taunus-Kreis. From 1973 to 1978, he was Erster Stadtrat of Limburg an der Lahn.

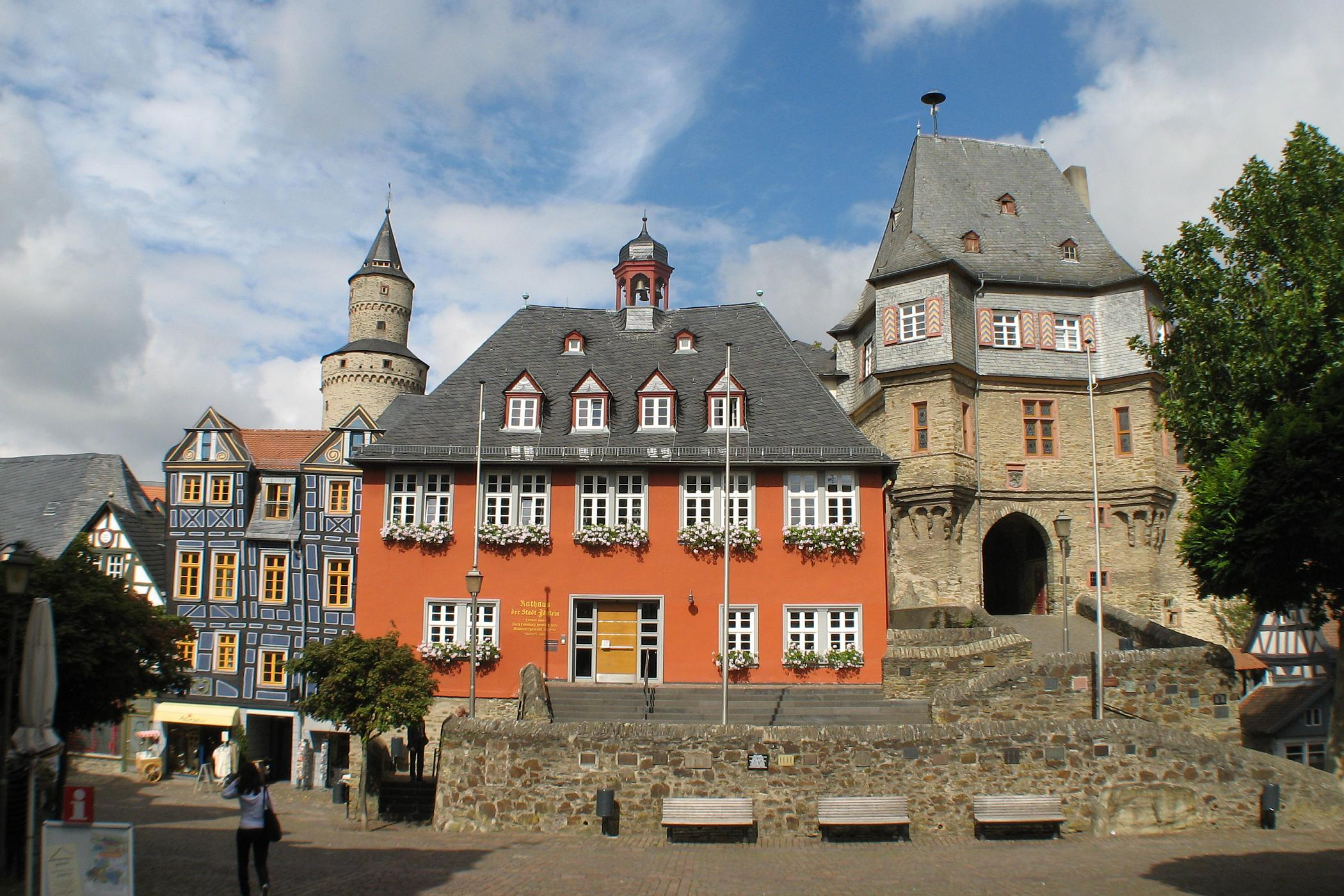
Townhall of Idstein, with landmarks Hexenturm and Schiefes Haus

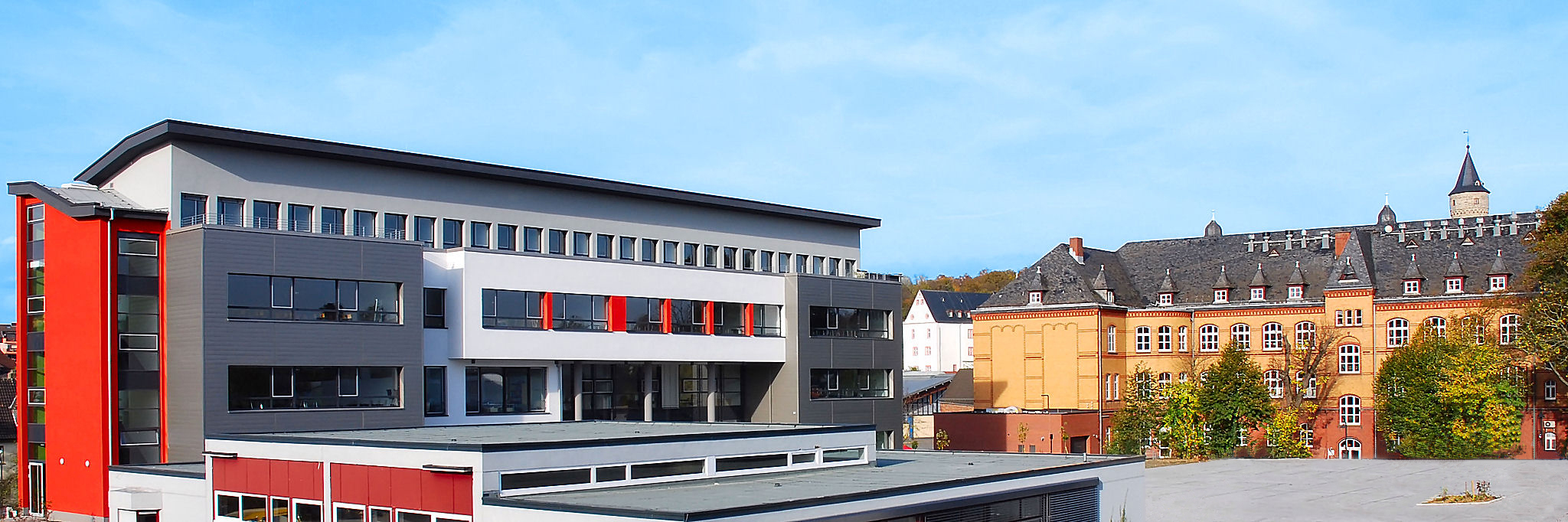
Hochschule Fresenius, 2010

From 1972 to 1974, Müller was Stadtverordneter and president of the CDU fraction in Idstein. In 1974, he was elected mayor of Idstein, a town on the German Timber-Frame Road. He served for 24 years, reelected twice by the assembly, the third time in direct election by the citizens. During his tenure the framework houses of the old town were restored, villages improved, a pedestrian area installed, education improved and the Stadthalle built as a cultural centre. He was responsible for bypass roads, new Kindertagesstätten and for restructuring business towards less production, more administration. Müller won the Hochschule Fresenius to move their prime location to Idstein. He attracted the festival week Hessentag to Idstein in 2002, which improved the infrastructure further.

Müller's successor was Gerhard Krum (SPD). Müller was on the board of the Arbeitsgemeinschaft Deutsche Fachwerkstädte (Working group German Framework Towns) and president of the Idsteiner Verkehrsverein which organises the annual open air Jazz festival.

Müller was married and had four children. He died in a hospital in Wiesbaden. In the funeral service at St. Martin, Idstein, his successor Krum mentioned his Christian and democratic values, Landrat (county governour) Burkhard Albers observed his ability to listening and to arguing factually without personal attacks. Klaus-Peter Willsch stated for the CDU fraction that Müller achieved his goal: "eine Altstadt voller Leben" (an old town full of life).
