= Ernst Toepfer =

German painter

Ernst Toepfer (4 June 1877 – 6 August 1955) was a German painter.

Toepfer was born in Wiesbaden, Hesse-Nassau. From 1893 to 1895, he attended the Zeichen-, Mal- und Kunstgewerbeschule, a private artist's school led by H. Bouffier, where he was commended for his diligence ("recht gutes Auffassungsvermögen und recht gutes Können, gepaart mit großem Fleiße"), then studied at the Großherzogliche Akademie der bildenden Künste in Karlsruhe, led by Leopold Graf von Kalckreuth, until mid-1898. Starting in 1898, Toepfer then studied at the Königlich-Akademische Hochschule der bildenden Künste in Berlin-Charlottenburg for ten years, from which he graduated in late 1908 as a master student with his own studio.

Toepfer married Maria Theresia Klaus, who he had met during a stay in Brandenburg, in Berlin in 1909; the couple then moved to Idstein in 1910 after finding a suitable house, the "Heerhof" (also "Höerhof"; Obergasse 15), complete with antique furniture.

After serving as a soldier during World War I, Toepfer in 1918 returned to his home region in Hesse and resumed painting, often depicting the region in which he grew up. His realist impressionist pictures are influenced by the works of Lovis Corinth, Wilhelm Leibl, Carl Schuch and Karl Blechen.

Toepfer died in Idstein on 6 August 1955. A street in Idstein is named after him.

== Literature ==
- Christel Lentz; Gerhard Lampe: Der Maler Ernst Toepfer: Leben und Werk, 2002, ISBN 3-00-009459-8, ISBN 978-3-00-009459-0
