= Erdmuthe Dorothea of Saxe-Zeitz =

German duchess (1661-1720)

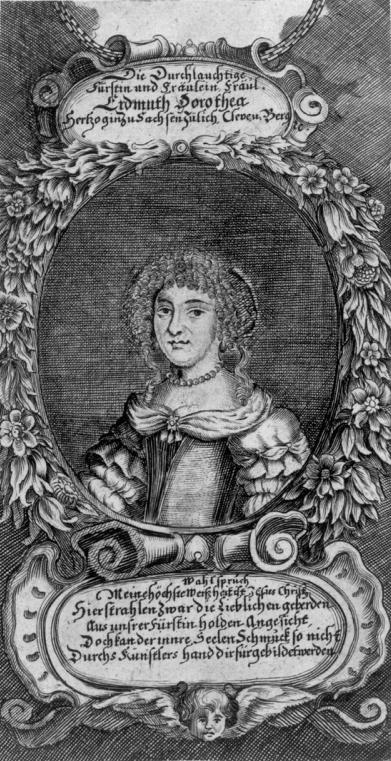
- Erdmuthe Dorothea of Saxe-Zeitz
- Full name: Erdmuthe Dorothea of Saxe-Zeitz
- Born: 13 November 1661; Naumburg
- Died: 29 April 1720 (aged 58); Bündorf Castle in Merseburg
- Buried: Merseburg Cathedral
- Noble family: House of Wettin
- Spouse: Christian II, Duke of Saxe-Merseburg
- Issue: Christian III Maurice, Duke of Saxe-Merseburg; Maurice Wilhelm, Duke of Saxe-Merseburg
- Father: Maurice, Duke of Saxe-Zeitz
- Mother: Dorothea Maria of Saxe-Weimar

Erdmuthe Dorothea of Saxe-Zeitz (13 November 1661 – 29 April 1720) was the wife of Duke Christian II of Saxe-Merseburg, whom she married on 14 October 1679 at Moritzburg Palace in Zeitz.

== Regent of the duchy of Saxe-Merseburg ==
After her husband's death on 20 October 1694, she took up the guardianship of her eldest son Christian III Maurice, and after his death twenty-five days later (14 November 1694), on behalf of his youngest son and next heir Maurice William, nicknamed Geigenherzog ("the violinist duke"), until he reached the age of 24 in 1712. She led the government and initiated the construction of a spa in Bad Lauchstädt. In 1710, she built a wooden well house in Bad Lauchstädt and planted lime trees, which formed a green arch.

== Death ==
She died in 1720 on her widow seat Bündorf Castle and was buried in the ducal crypt in Merseburg Cathedral.

On the occasion of her death a gold ducat coin was minted. One of the four obelisks in the garden of Merseburg Castle is dedicated to her memory.
