= Osterburg (Verwaltungsgemeinschaft) =

Former municipality in Saxony-Anhalt, Germany

Coordinates: 52°47′N 11°46′E

Osterburg (German: [ˈoːstɐˌbʊʁk]) was a Verwaltungsgemeinschaft ("collective municipality") in the district of Stendal, in Saxony-Anhalt, Germany. It was dissolved on 1 July 2009. The seat of the Verwaltungsgemeinschaft was in Osterburg.

The Verwaltungsgemeinschaft Osterburg consisted of the following municipalities:

1. Ballerstedt
2. Düsedau
3. Erxleben
4. Flessau
5. Gladigau
6. Königsmark
7. Krevese
8. Meseberg
9. Osterburg
10. Rossau
11. Walsleben
