= Osterburg =

Osterburg may refer to:

- Osterburg (Altmark), a town in Saxony-Anhalt, Germany
  - Osterburg station, a railway station in the town
  - Osterburg (Verwaltungsgemeinschaft), a former collective municipality that included the town
- Osterburg (Groothusen), a castle in Lower Saxony, Germany
- Osterburg (Weida), a castle in Weida, Thuringia, Germany
- Osterburg, Pennsylvania, US, a village

== See also ==
- Osterberg, a municipality in the district of Neu-Ulm, Bavaria, Germany
