= List of presidential trips made by George W. Bush (2008–09) =

This is a list of presidential trips made by George W. Bush during 2008 and January 2009, the eighth and final year of his presidency as the 43rd president of the United States. International trips are highlighted in blue.

This list excludes trips made within Washington, D.C., the U.S. federal capital in which the White House, the official residence and principal workplace of the president, is located. It also excludes the capital's immediate surroundings in Maryland and Virginia, such as Andrews Air Force Base in Maryland, where the president typically boards Air Force One for all trips outside the area. Also excluded are trips to Camp David, the country residence of the president, and to the Bush family's Prairie Chapel Ranch near Crawford.

== January 2008 ==
State or country	Areas visited	Dates	Details
Illinois	Chicago	January 7	Spoke about education policy at Horace Greeley Elementary School. Endorsed the Chicago bid for the 2016 Summer Olympics at the Union League Club of Chicago.
Israel	Tel Aviv, Jerusalem	January 9–11	Met with Prime Minister Ehud Olmert and President Shimon Peres. Visited Yad Vashem.
Palestinian National Authority	Ramallah, Bethlehem	January 10	Met with President Mahmoud Abbas. Visited the Church of the Nativity.
Kuwait	Kuwait City, Camp Arifjan	January 11–12	Attended Roundtable on Democracy and Development. Met with Gen. David Petraeus and United States Ambassador to Iraq Ryan Crocker. Addressed U.S. military personnel.
Bahrain	Manama	January 12–13	Met with King Hamad bin Isa Al Khalifa. Addressed U.S. military personnel, becoming the first U.S. president to visit the country.
United Arab Emirates	Abu Dhabi, Dubai	January 13–14	Met with President Khalifa bin Zayed Al Nahyan and Prime Minister Mohammed bin Rashid Al Maktoum, becoming the first U.S. president to visit the country.
Saudi Arabia	Riyadh, Al-Janadriyah	January 14–16	Met with King Abdullah.
Egypt	Sharm El Sheikh	January 16	Met with President Hosni Mubarak.
Maryland	Frederick	January 18	Toured a local business, Wright Manufacturing, Inc.
West Virginia	White Sulphur Springs	January 25	Spoke at a Congress of Tomorrow luncheon at The Greenbrier.
Maryland	Baltimore	January 29	Toured the Episcopal Community Services of Maryland's Jericho Program, an organization supported by the White House Office of Faith-Based and Community Initiatives.
California	Torrance	January 30	Toured Robinson Helicopter Company.
Nevada	Las Vegas	January 31	Spoke about international collaboration against terrorism at the Emerald at Queensridge.

== February ==
State or country	Areas visited	Dates	Details
Missouri	Kansas City	February 1	Designated February as American Heart Month in an event at the InterContinental Kansas City Hotel. Toured a Hallmark Cards manufacturing facility.
Tennessee	Lafayette	February 8	Toured damage from the 2008 Super Tuesday tornado outbreak that had occurred on February 5.
Benin	Porto-Novo	February 16	Met with President Yayi Boni, becoming the first U.S. president to visit the country.
Tanzania	Dar es Salaam, Arusha	February 16–19	Met with President Jakaya Kikwete. Signed Millenimum Challenge agreement.
Rwanda	Kigali	February 19	Met with President Paul Kagame. Dedicated new U.S. Embassy.
Ghana	Accra	February 19–21	Met with President John Kufuor.
Liberia	Monrovia	February 21	Met with President Ellen Johnson Sirleaf.

== March ==
State or country	Areas visited	Dates	Details
Tennessee	Nashville	March 11	Attended the National Religious Broadcasters Convention.
Florida	Jacksonville	March 18	Spoke about international trade at the Blount Island Marine Terminal.
Virginia	Sterling	March 26	Toured a local business, ColorCraft of Virginia.
Ohio	Dayton	March 27	Visited the National Museum of the United States Air Force.
New Jersey	Freehold	March 28	Toured a local mortgage counseling service, Novadebt.

== April ==
State or country	Areas visited	Dates	Details
Ukraine	Kyiv	April 1	Met with President Viktor Yushchenko and Prime Minister Yulia Tymoshenko.
Romania	Bucharest	April 2–4	Attended the NATO Summit Meeting.
Croatia	Zagreb	April 4–5	Met with President Stjepan Mesić.
Russia	Sochi	April 5–6	Met with President Vladimir Putin and President-elect Dmitry Medvedev.
Louisiana	New Orleans, Baton Rouge	April 21–22	Hosted the North American Leaders' Summit in New Orleans. Viewed the city's recovery from Hurricane Katrina. Endorsed John Kennedy for Senate election in Baton Rouge.
Connecticut	Hartford	April 25	Visited the local Boys & Girls Club to observe World Malaria Day.

== May ==
State or country	Areas visited	Dates	Details
Missouri	Maryland Heights	May 2	Toured headquarters of World Wide Technology, Inc.
Kansas	Greensburg	May 4	Gave the commencement address at Greensburg High School.
Israel	Tel Aviv, Jerusalem, Masada	May 14–16	Met with President Shimon Peres and Prime Minister Ehud Olmert. Addressed the Knesset. Attended Israel's 60th anniversary. Visited the Masada fortification site.
Saudi Arabia	Riyadh, al-Janadriyah	May 16–17	Met with King Abdullah.
Egypt	Sharm El Sheikh	May 17–18	Met with President Hosni Mubarak, King Abdullah II of Jordan, Palestinian Authority president Mahmoud Abbas and Prime Minister Salam Fayyad, Afghan president Hamid Karzai and Pakistani prime minister Yousaf Raza Gillani. Addressed the World Economic Forum.
Arizona	Mesa	May 27	Toured a local business, Silverado Cable Company.
Colorado	Colorado Springs	May 28	Gave the commencement address at the United States Air Force Academy.
South Carolina	Greenville	May 31	Gave the commencement address at Furman University.

== June ==
State or country	Areas visited	Dates	Details
Slovenia	Ljubljana	June 9–10	Met with President Danilo Türk and Prime Minister Janez Janša. Attended the EU-US Summit Meeting.
Germany	Meseberg	June 10–11	Met with Chancellor Angela Merkel.
Italy	Rome	June 11–13	Met with President Giorgio Napolitano and Prime Minister Silvio Berlusconi.
Vatican City	Apostolic Palace	June 13	Met with Pope Benedict XVI.
France	Paris	June 13–15	Met with President Nicolas Sarkozy. Addressed the OECD. Attended wreath-laying ceremonies at the Suresnes American Cemetery and Memorial and Mémorial de la France combattante.
United Kingdom	London, Belfast	June 15–16	Met with Queen Elizabeth II at Windsor Castle. Met with Prime Minister Gordon Brown and Quartet Representative Tony Blair. In Belfast, met with First Minister Peter Robertson and Deputy First Minister Martin McGuinness.
Iowa	Cedar Rapids, Iowa City	June 19	Toured the aftermath of the June 2008 Midwest floods.
Michigan	Livonia	June 25	Attended the Max M. Fisher National Republican Leadership Award Dinner.

== July ==
State or country	Areas visited	Dates	Details
Arkansas	North Little Rock	July 1	Toured the local Family Service Agency.
Virginia	Charlottesville	July 4	Attended a naturalization ceremony at Monticello for Independence Day.
Japan	Tōyako	July 6–9	Attended the 34th G8 summit. Met with Tanzanian president Kikwete, Indian prime minister Manmohan Singh, Chinese president Hu Jintao and South Korean president Lee Myung-bak.
California	Redding	July 17	Toured damage from the 2008 California wildfires.
Texas	Houston	July 18	Campaigned for Pete Olson for House of Representatives election.
Ohio	Euclid	July 29	Toured a local business, Lincoln Electric Company.
West Virginia	White Sulphur Springs	July 31	Spoke to the West Virginia Coal Association at The Greenbrier.

== August ==
State or country	Areas visited	Dates	Details
Alaska	Eielson Air Force Base	August 4	Spoke to personnel during stopover en route to international trip.
South Korea	Seoul	August 5–6	Met with President Lee Myung-bak. Addressed U.S. military personnel.
Thailand	Bangkok	August 6–7	Met with Prime Minister Samak Sundaravej.
China	Beijing	August 7–11	Visited Kuanjie Protestant Christian Church. Attended the opening ceremonies of the Olympic Games. Met with President Hu Jintao and Russian Prime Minister Vladimir Putin.
Florida	Orlando	August 20	Attended Veterans of Foreign Wars National Convention.
Louisiana	New Orleans	August 20	Spoke at Jackson Barracks on the approximate third anniversary of Hurricane Katrina.
Mississippi	Gulfport	August 20	Observed recovery efforts on the approximate third anniversary of Hurricane Katrina.

== September ==
State or country	Areas visited	Dates	Details
Texas	Austin, Lackland Air Force Base	September 1	Visited emergency response facilities during Hurricane Gustav.
Louisiana	Baton Rouge	September 3	Visited emergency response facilities during Hurricane Gustav.
Oklahoma	Oklahoma City	September 12	Discussed health savings accounts and preparations for Hurricane Ike at Presbyterian Health Foundation.
Texas	Houston	September 16	Toured recovery efforts from Hurricane Ike at Ellington Field Joint Reserve Base.
New York	New York	September 23–24	Addressed the 63rd United Nations General Assembly.

== October ==
State or country	Areas visited	Dates	Details
Texas	Midland, San Antonio	October 4–6	Visited George W. Bush Childhood Home. Toured a local San Antonio business, Olmos Pharmacy.
Ohio	Cincinnati	October 6	Spoke to the Cincinnati chapter of the Federalist Society at the Hilton Cincinnati Netherland Plaza.
Florida	Coral Gables	October 10	Met leaders of the local Cuban American community.
Michigan	Ada Township	October 15	Toured a local business, the Schnitz Ada Grill.
Louisiana	Alexandria	October 20	Visited the Central Louisiana Chamber of Commerce.

== November ==
State or country	Areas visited	Dates	Details
New York	New York	November 11–13	Attended rededication of the Intrepid Museum. Addressed the 63rd United Nations General Assembly. Spoke at the Manhattan Institute for Policy Research.
Peru	Lima	November 21–23	Attended the APEC Summit Meeting.
Kentucky	Fort Campbell	November 25	Spoke to troops two days before Thanksgiving.

== December ==
State or country	Areas visited	Dates	Details
North Carolina	Greensboro, North Carolina	December 2	Visited the Mentoring Children of Prisoners Initiative.
Pennsylvania	Philadelphia	December 6	Attended the Army–Navy Game at Lincoln Financial Field. Present for the unveiling of a presidential portrait at the Union League of Philadelphia.
New York	West Point	December 9	Addressed cadets at the United States Military Academy.
Texas	College Station	December 12	Gave the commencement address at Texas A&M University.
Iraq	Baghdad	December 14	Met with President Jalal Talabani and Prime Minister Nouri al-Maliki. Signed Strategic Framework and Security Agreements. Visited U.S. military personnel.
Afghanistan	Kabul	December 14–15	Met with President Hamid Karzai. Visited U.S. military personnel.
United Kingdom	RAF Mildenhall	December 15	Stopped during return to Washington, D.C. Met with military personnel.
Pennsylvania	Carlisle	December 17	Addressed cadets at the United States Army War College.

== January 2009 ==
State or country	Areas visited	Dates	Details
Pennsylvania	Philadelphia	January 8	Spoke about the No Child Left Behind Act at General Philip Kearny School.
Virginia	Norfolk	January 10	Attended the commissioning ceremony of the USS George H. W. Bush.
