= Rossau =

Rossau may refer to:

- Rossau, Saxony, a municipality in the district of Mittweida, Saxony, Germany
- Rossau, Saxony-Anhalt, part of the town Osterburg in the district of Stendal, Saxony-Anhalt, Germany
- Roßau, a part of the 9th district of Vienna, Austria
