= Franz Ludwig Güssefeld =

German cartographer

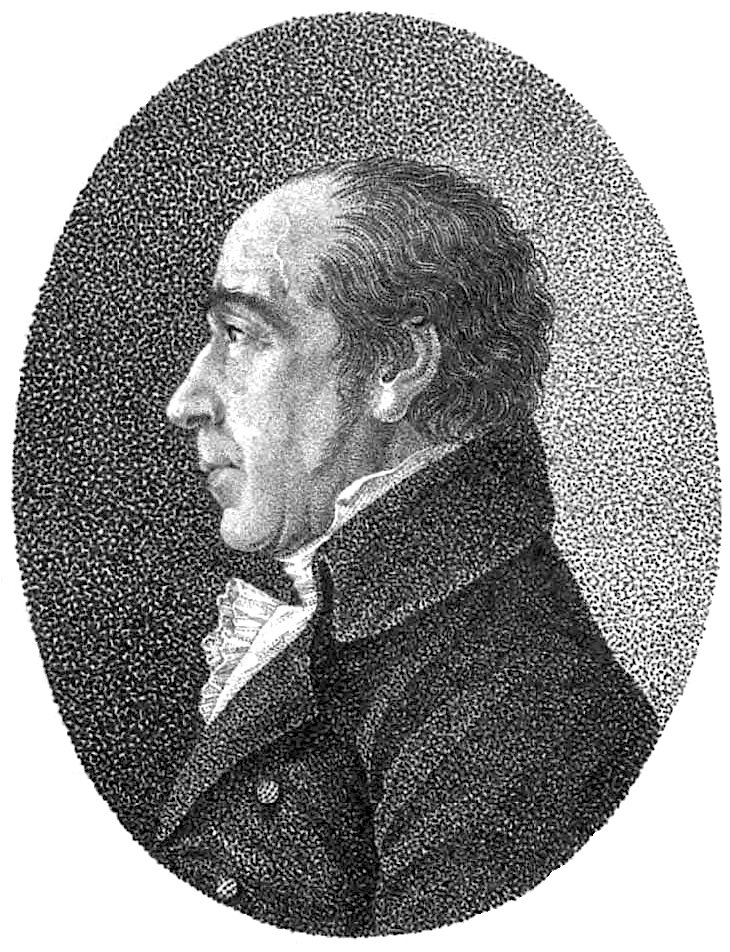
- Portrait of Güssefeld published in 1808
- Born: 6 December 1744; Osterburg (Altmark)
- Died: 17 June 1807 (aged 62); Weimar
- Occupations: surveyor, cartographer, engineer, forester
- Known for: Maps published by Homann Heirs
- Spouse: Johanna Christiana Brunquel (1744–1807)

Franz Ludwig Güssefeld (6 December 1744 – 17 June 1807) was a German cartographer. He is noted for his highly accurate maps which were mostly published by Homannsche Erben (Homann Heirs") in Nuremberg.

== Biography ==
Güssefeld was born in Osterburg and already had an interest in drawing and creating maps in his youth. When he failed to secure a position with the Prussian Corps of Engineers, he became a forester.

His 1773 map of Brandenburg was the first of over 100 maps of his that were published by Homann Heirs. The high quality of Güssefeld's work is credited with saving Homann Heirs, a formerly famous publisher which before Güssefeld's arrival had been in an increasingly difficult position due to mismanagement.

During the final 18 years of his life, the Landes-Industrie Comptoir and Geographisches Institut von Bertuch in Weimar also published some of Güssefeld's maps. Güssefeld died of pulmonary edema in Weimar in 1807.

== Gallery ==
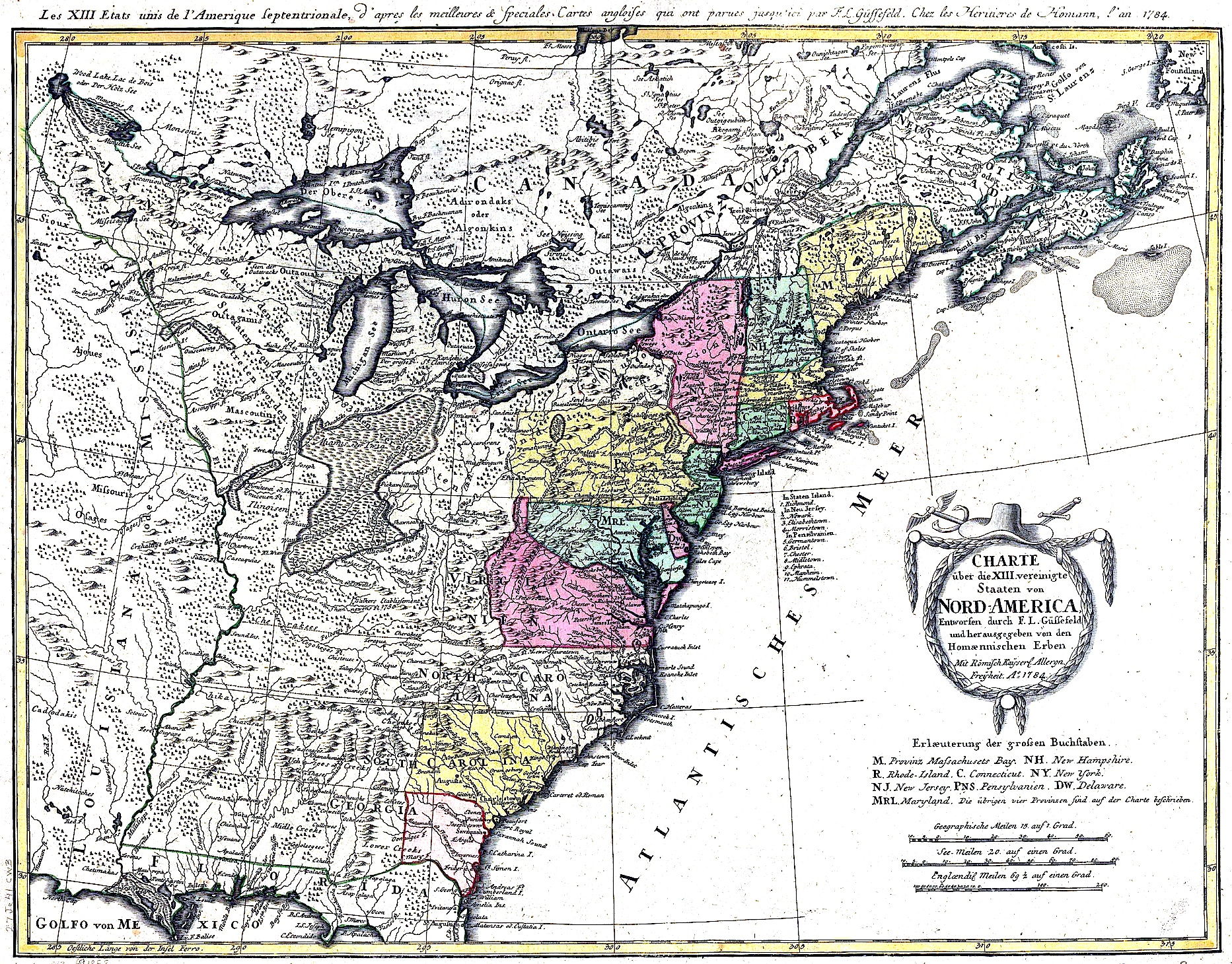
United States (1784)

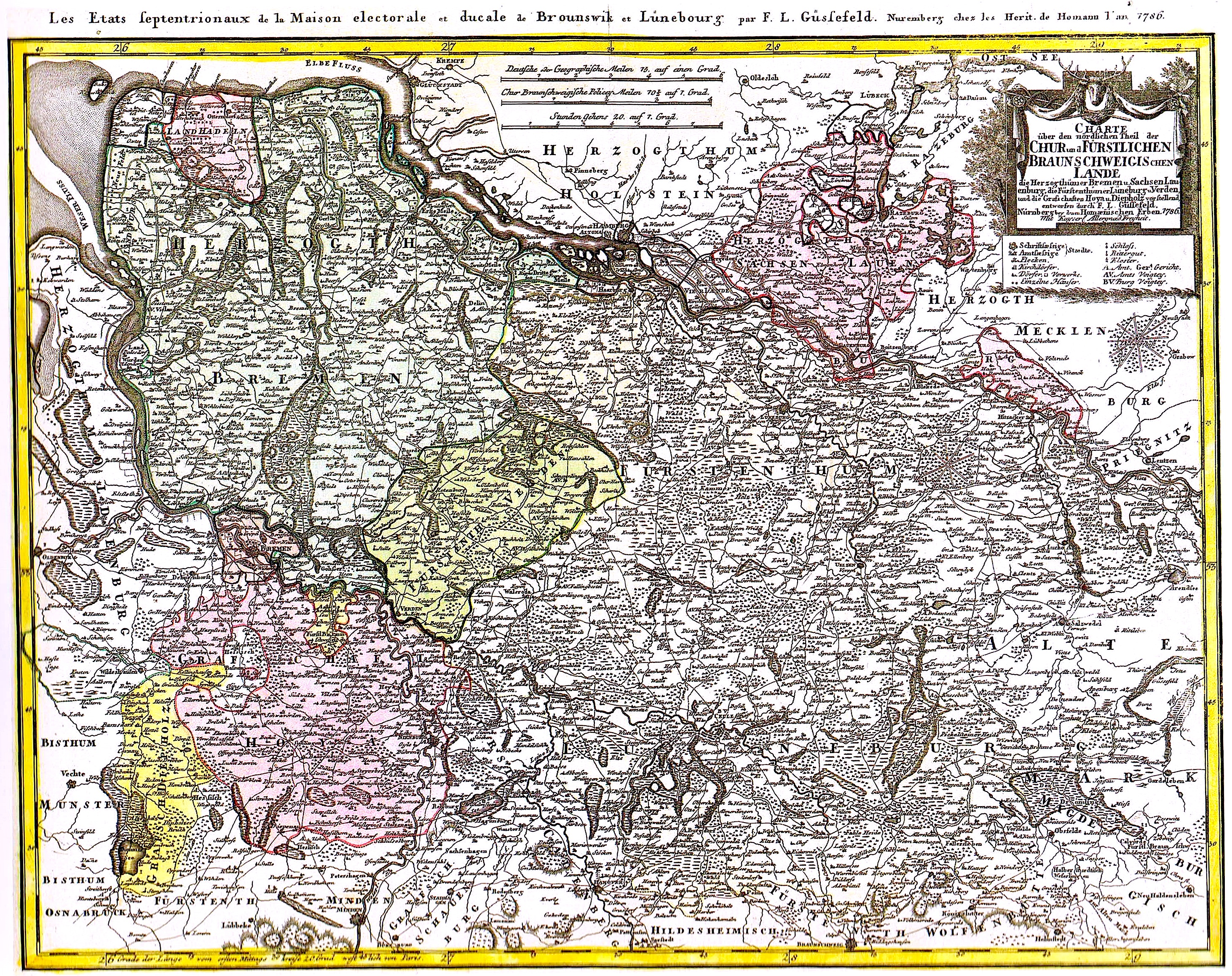
Lower Saxony (1786)

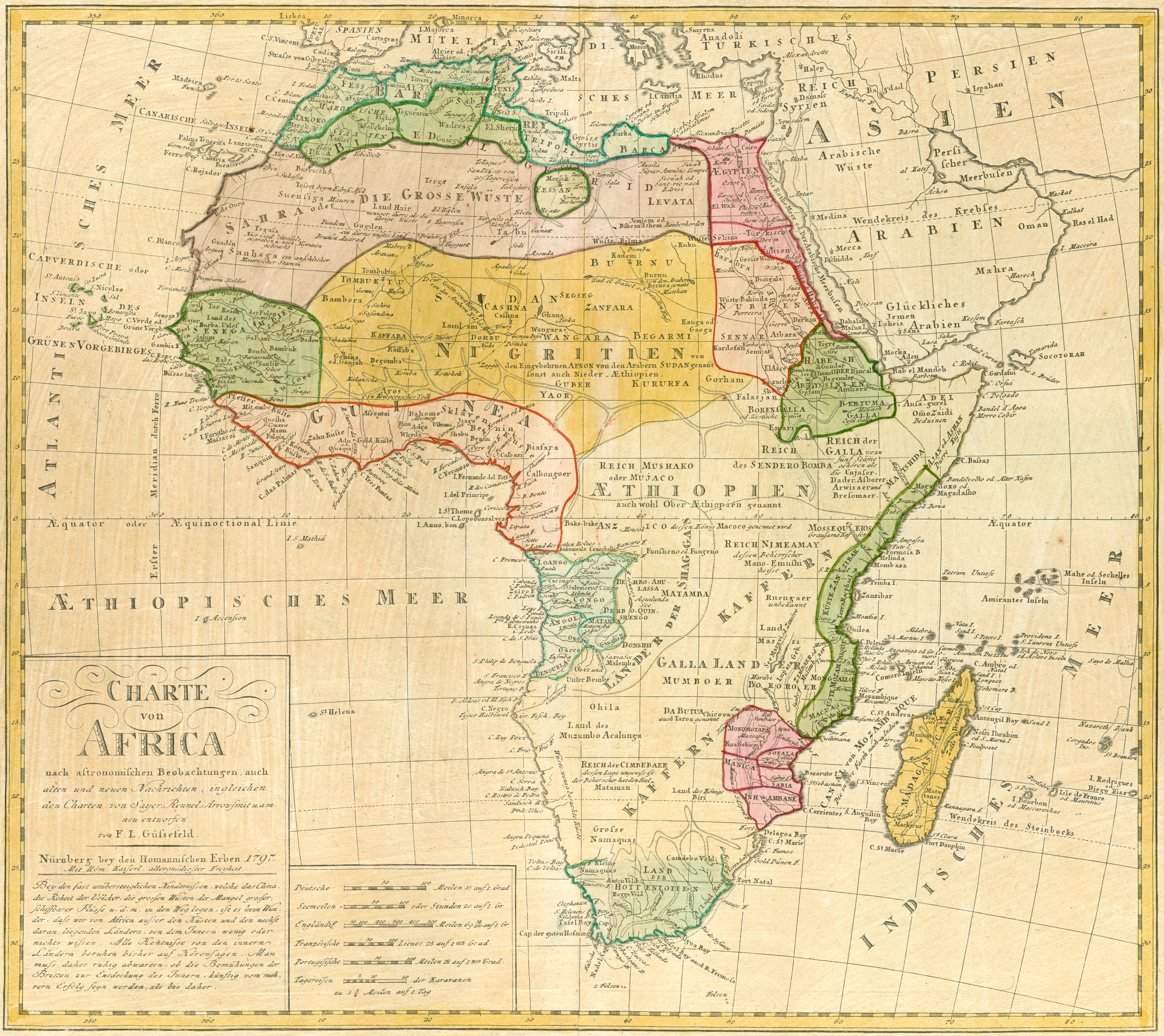
Africa (1797)

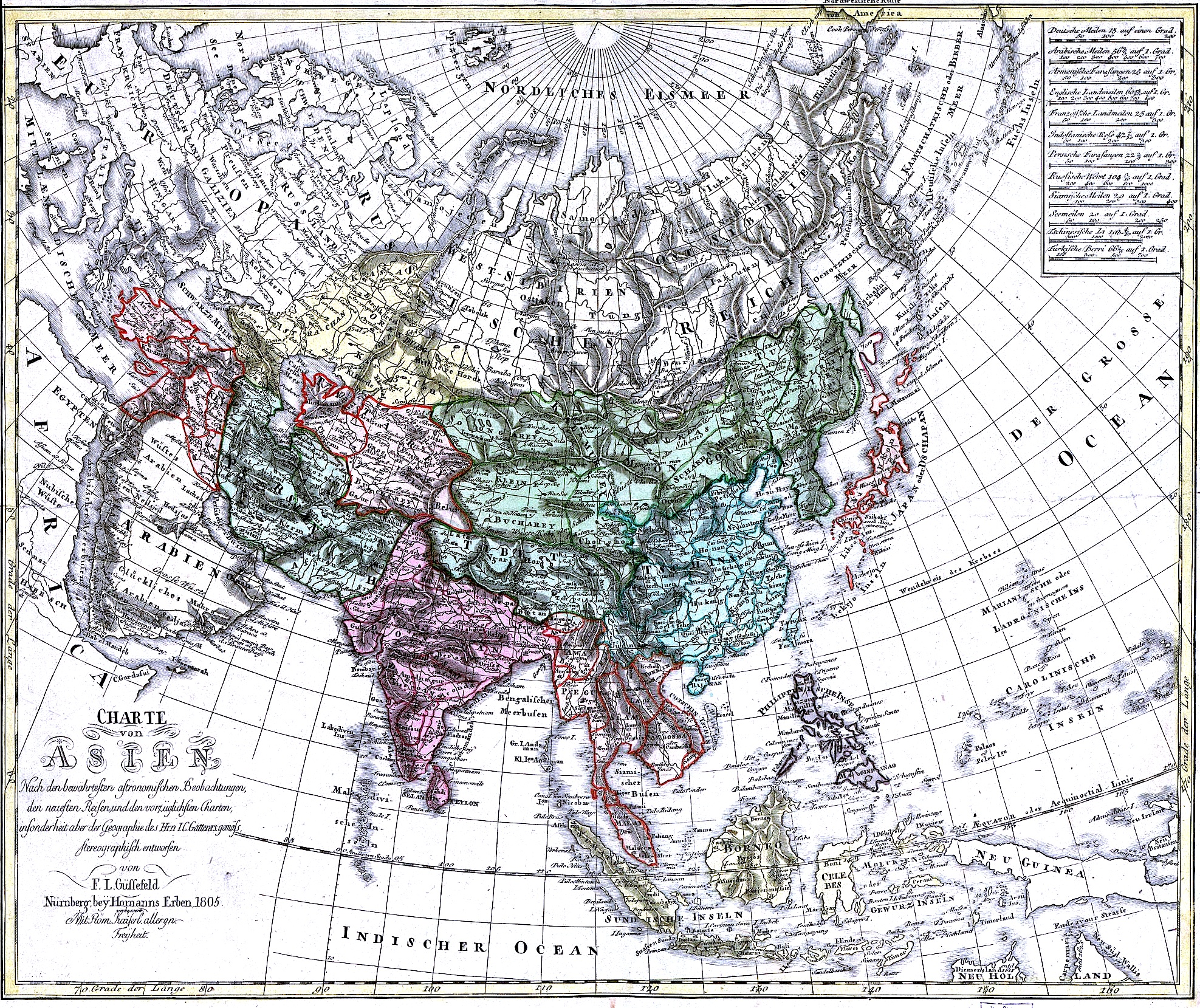
Asia (1805)
