= Erxleben =

Erxleben may refer to:

== Places ==
- Erxleben, Stendal, part of the town Osterburg in the district of Stendal in Saxony-Anhalt, Germany
- Erxleben, Börde, a municipality in the district of Börde in Saxony-Anhalt, Germany

== People ==
- Dorothea Erxleben (1715–1762), the first female medical doctor in Germany
- Heather Erxleben (born 1966), former Canadian Forces soldier who was the first female to graduate from a Regular Force infantry trades training course
- Johann Christian Polycarp Erxleben (1744–1777), German naturalist and professor of physics and veterinary medicine
- Russell Erxleben (born 1957), American former football player and currency investor convicted of securities fraud in 1999

== Other uses ==
- A meteorite fall that occurred on 15 April 1812 near Erxleben, Saxony-Anhalt
- A crater on the planet Venus, named after Dorothea Erxleben (see List of craters on Venus)
