= Friedrich Wilhelm Weidemann =

German painter (1668–1750)

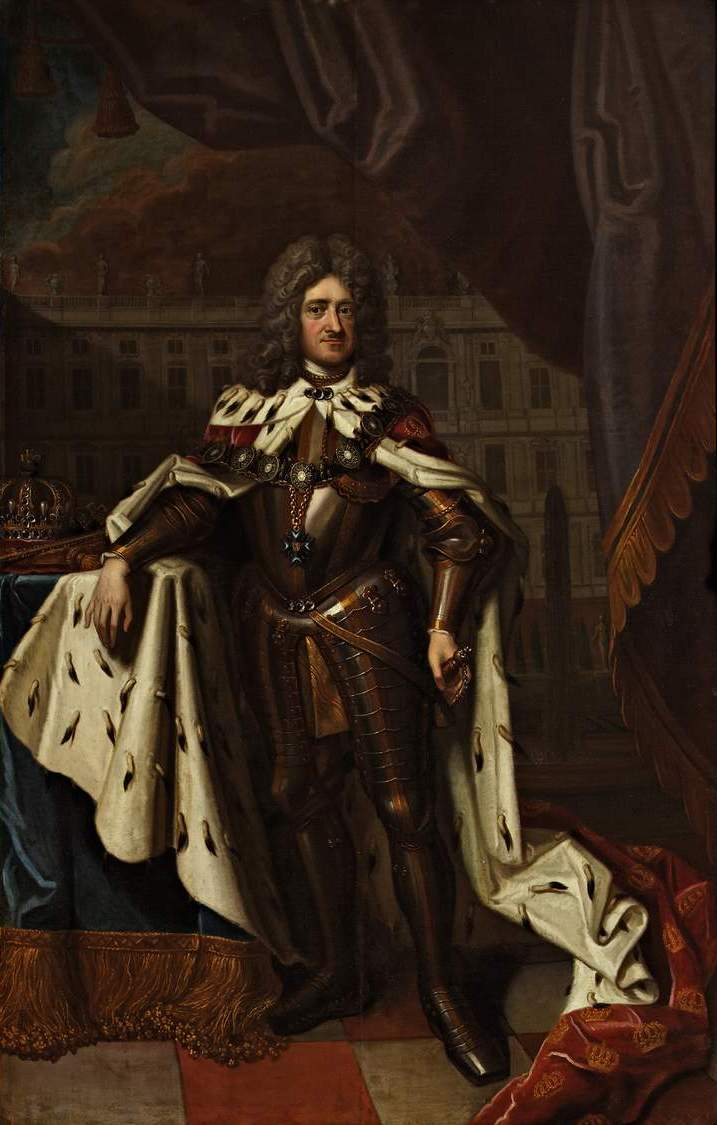
Friedrick I of Prussia by Friedrich Wilhelm Weidemann

Friedrich Wilhelm Weidemann or Wiedemann (1668, Osterburg - 25 December 1750, Berlin) was a German painter. From 1702 he worked as court painter to Frederick William I, prince and later king of Prussia. He also produced portraits of several other members of the Prussian royal family.

== Life ==
Born in what is now Sachsen-Anhalt but what was then the Mark Brandenburg, Weidemann learned painting under the Dutch painter and architect Rutger van Langevelt, who had been working at Frederick William's court since 1678. He later also studied under Samuel Theodor Gericke and Langevelt's son Wilhelm van Langevelt. He completed his education at the Berlin Academy of Arts and worked in London for a time under the Lübeck-born British court painter Godfrey Kneller.

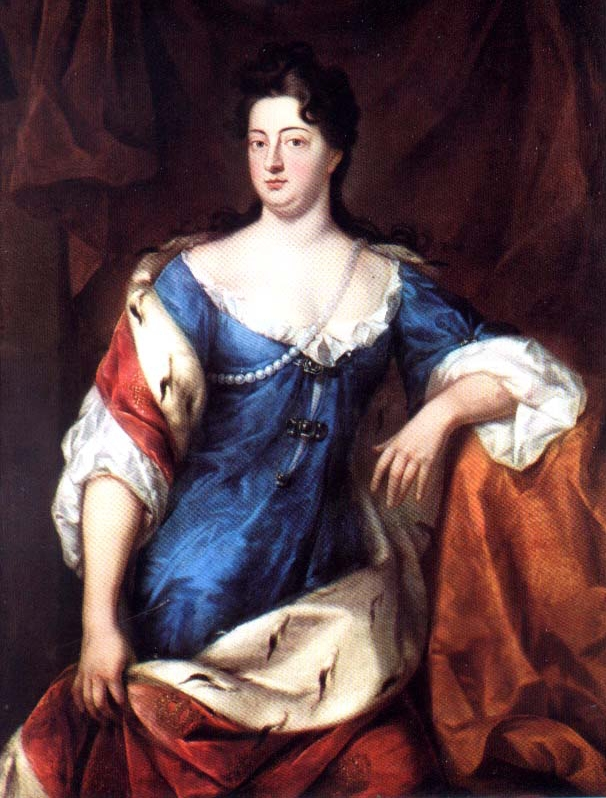
Sophie Charlotte, Queen of Prussia by Friedrich Wilhelm Weidemann

On his return to Berlin Friedrich Wilhelm Weidemann was - as Heinecken reports - presented to Frederick William by the influential countess Katharina von Wartenberg, wife of the prime minister Johann Kasimir Kolbe von Wartenberg. In 1702 he became a court painter. Weidemann made several paintings of members of the royal family, especially queen Sophie Charlotte - one of the latter now hangs in the Schloss Charlottenburg in Berlin, whilst others are in the Schloss in Königs Wusterhausen. His paintings were very popular among his contemporaries and were engraved by G.P. Busch, A. B. König, Jakob Wilhelm Heckenauer, John Smith and Johann Jakob Haid. He remained the most popular painter for a long period under Frederick William I, until being superseded by the French painter Antoine Pesne, brought to Berlin in 1710 by prince Frederick William's father Frederick I and appointed official court painter on 6 May 1711.

In 1708 Weidemann was made ordinary clerk and member of the Berlin Academy, becoming its rector in 1712 and its director in 1718 (succeeding Samuel Theodor Gericke), holding the final position until his death. From 1730 onwards he mainly taught as a professor of perspective.

== Family ==
Weidemann's younger cousin Carl Emil Weidemann (1685 - 1735) also studied under Kneller in London for a time and followed Friedrich Wilhelm into court painting. He later painted portraits in Berlin and was court painter to Sophie Dorothea.

== Bibliography ==
- Johann Rudolf Füssli: Allgemeins Künstlerlexicon. Zürich 1779.
- Johann Rudolf Füssli: Allgemeines Künstlerlexikon. Zürich 1806.
- Karl Heinrich von Heinecken: Nachrichten von Künstlern und Kunst-Sachen. Teil 1. Verlag Johann Paul Krauss, Wien 1768.
- Rudolf G. Scharmann: Schloss Charlottenburg. Königliches Preußen in Berlin. 4. Aufl. Prestel-Verlag, München u. a. 2010, ISBN 978-3-7913-2815-7.
