= Friedrich Justin Bertuch =

German publisher (1747–1822)

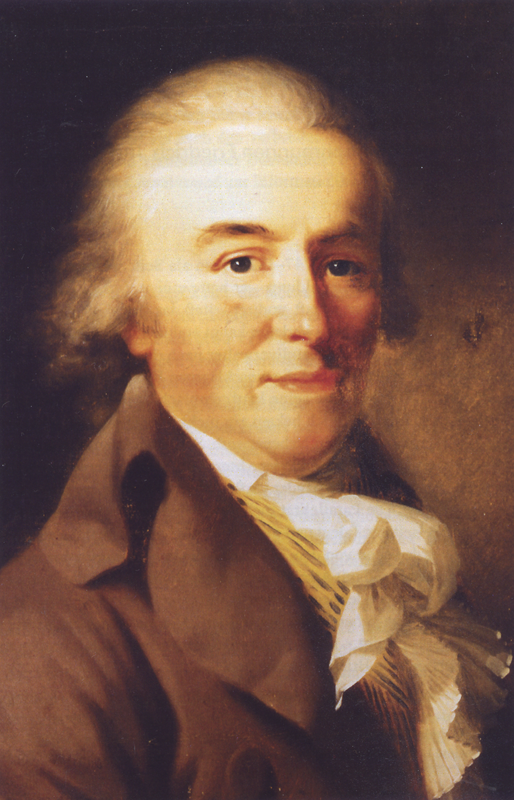
- Portrait of Bertuch by Johann Friedrich August Tischbein (1796)
- Born: 30 September 1747; Germany
- Died: 3 April 1822
- Occupation: Publisher
- Children: Karl Bertuch

Friedrich Johann Justin Bertuch (30 September 1747 – 3 April 1822) was a German publisher and patron of the arts. He co-founded the Weimar Princely Free Drawing School with the painter Georg Melchior Kraus in 1776. He was the father of the writer and journalist Karl Bertuch.

== Life ==
=== Early life ===
Bertuch came from a family attested in the Tennstedt area of Thuringia since the 15th century. When Friedrich Johann Justin Bertuch was 5, his father Justin became garrison doctor in the service of duke Ernst August Konstantin at Blutsturz. He lost his mother aged 15 and grew up in the house of his uncle Gottfried Matthias Ludwig Schrön (a member of the Weimarer Rat der Landschaftskasse). He attended the Weimar Gymnasium, studied from 1765 to 1769 theology then law at the Landesuniversität in Jena. His main interest, however, was for literature and natural history.

His acquaintance with Freiherr Ludwig Heinrich Bachofen von Echt allowed the 22-year-old Bertuch to break off his studies without taking his final exams, and that same year he began work as tutor to Ludwig's son at the Gut Dobitschen at Altenburg, holding the post until 1773. From him he learned Spanish (Bachoff von Echt was envoy to Spain), translating Don Quixote into German and self-publishing it in 1774. His translations from English and French literature also promised success.

=== Weimar ===
In 1773 he returned to Weimar for health reasons, though he maintained contacts with the court kapellmeister Ernst Wilhelm Wolf and his wife, the daughter of the famous Konzertmeister Franz Benda, as well as with the acting couple Friederike and Abel Seyler, the actor Konrad Ekhof and the professor at the gymnasium Johann Karl August Musäus. He funded his living expenses until 1796 as manager of the ducal private finances.

Christoph Martin Wieland, tutor at the Weimar court and publisher of the "Teutschen Merkur", cooperated with Bertuch from 1782 to 1786 and provided him with his way into the Weimar court. His translation of the tragedy "Inès de Castro" given before duchess Anna Amalia from the French of Antoine Houdar de la Motte received much attention.

In 1774 he submitted the plan for a Zeichenschule in Weimar, which was finally set up drawing on his ideas by Johann Heinrich Meyer and from 1788 Goethe. Bertuch's goal was that any interested persons, whatever their social standing, might have the chance to gain technical crafts skills and training for their talents.

=== From 1775 ===
In 1775 he became private secretary to the duke and held that role until 1787, during which time he participated in the Weimar Masonic lodge Amalia zu den drei Rosen. He also had many business activities. In 1777 he gained a hereditary lease on the großen Baumgarten in Erbpacht, a Grundstück, now known as the Schwansee-Park. In 1782 he founded a factory for artificial flowers, an artistic and commercial fashion item, with which he had success right across Germany. In 1785 he set up the Allgemeine Literatur-Zeitung (later the Neue Jena'sche Allgemeine Literaturzeitung).

From 1778 he could change the works themselves, into a paper mill and pigment production, in another example of his vision and commercial talent. In 1780 he leased his house to the Weimarer Baumgarten, and also moved his flower production there, where Goethe's later wife Christiane Vulpius was employed.

The Journal des Luxus und der Moden, published by Bertuch from 1786, not only praised artificial flowers but also the technical innovations and reading matter on maintenance and instruction, and is considered as the first pictorial periodical in Europe. He planned a Landes-Industrie-Comptoirs, to promote regional industry, train skilled workers and increase the prosperity of the region, and was given a princely dispensation to set it up in 1791. He temporarily employed 400 to 500 people (around 10% of the Weimar population) and succeeded in combining printers, artists and cartographers under one roof. Pay there was also above average.

In 1793 Bertuch himself defined this art business in a magazine as being "an infallible means of encouraging German industry and spreading food and prosperity among us". Here again practically applied Enlightenment ideas pointed to a kind of free market economy

Bertuch was just such a private citizen who attained national and European influence above and beyond "local usefulness and effectiveness". Within the Cartoir and the paper and colour mill he set up a cartographical department (which became in 1804 the Geographisches Institut and continued to grow).

With his instruments of printing for the "literary and artistic industry", Bertuch held himself to be a "literary midwife". He underwrote Goethe's first publication with Göschen, and his "Allgemeine Literatur-Zeitung" increased in circulation and receipts.

Between 1790 and 1830 Betruch printed the Bilderbuch für Kinder appeared in 12 volumes. An educational work, it appeared in monthly instalments and aimed to "spread the knowledge of the epochs out before children" with 1185 pages and 6000 illustrations. It is available online: see 'External Links', below.

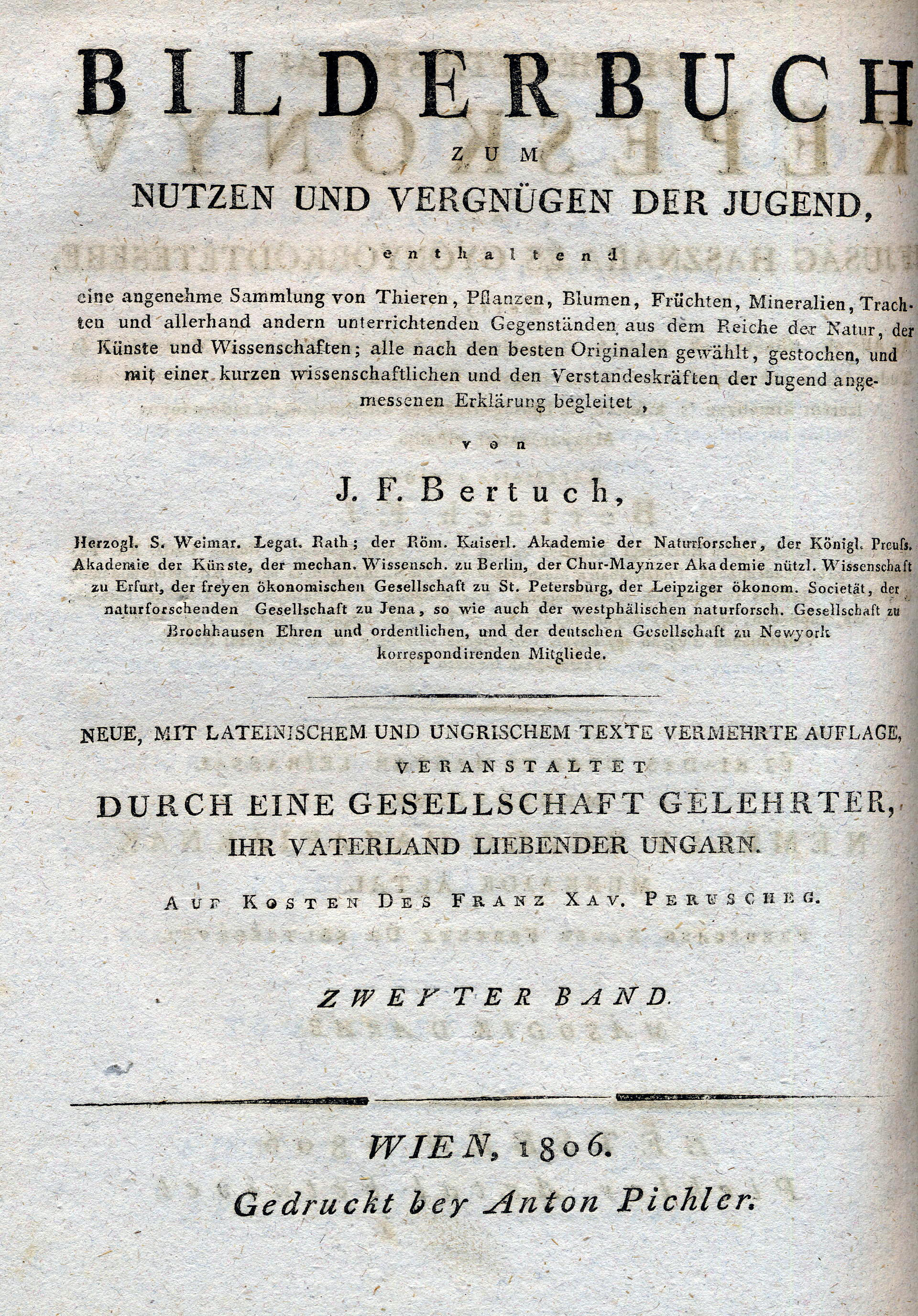
JF Bertuch's Kinderbuch – title page

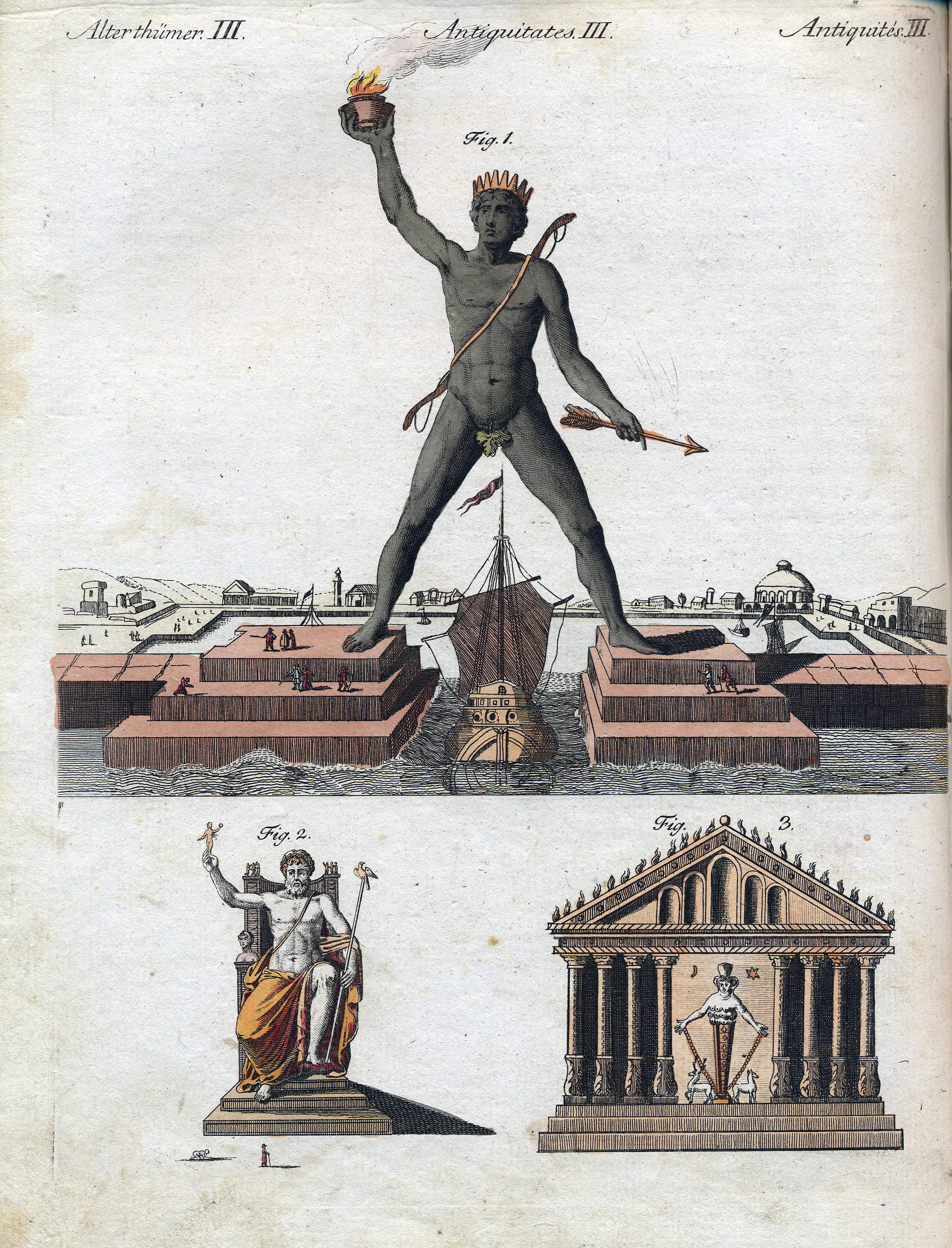
JF Bertuch's Kinderbuch – Wonders of the world

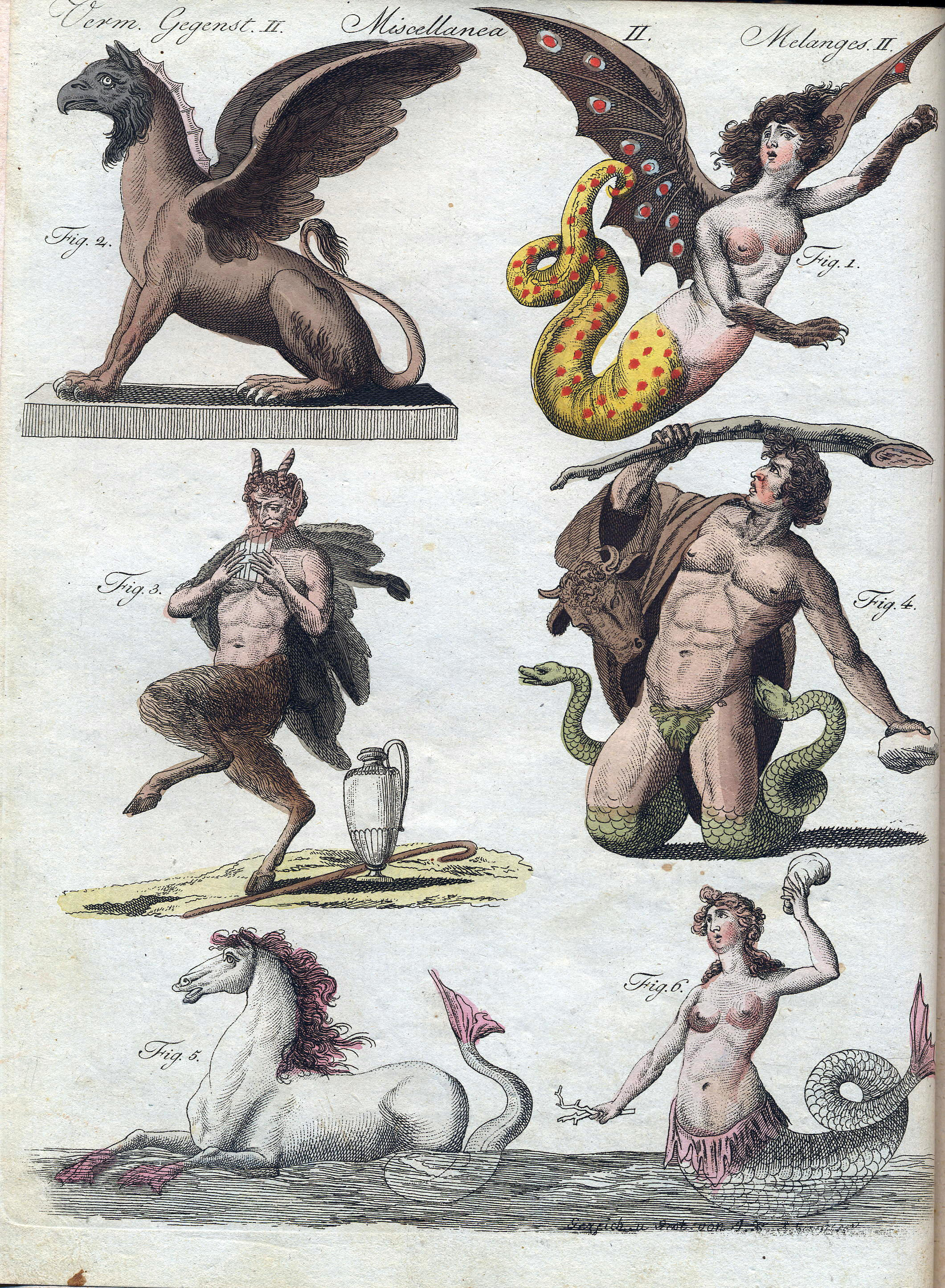
JF Bertuch's Kinderbuch – Mythological creatures

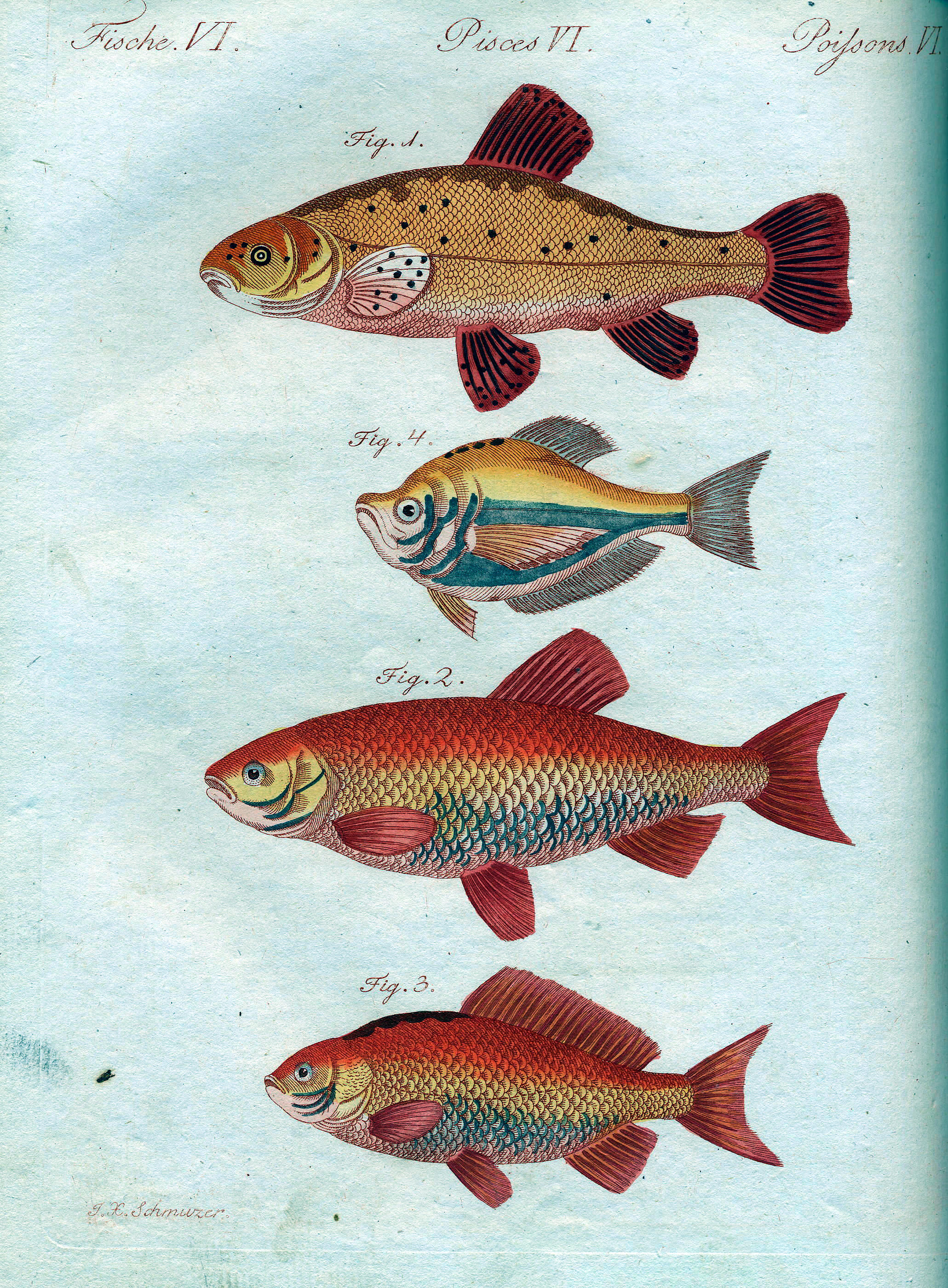
JF Bertuch's Kinderbuch – Fish

Translations, medical works – culture in its widest sense – was made accessible for a wide public via Bertuch's work. Goethe's classical work on the Iphigenia works and textual and visual sketches of a "newly-invented English washing machine" were both published by him, and this tension between the ideal and the real, even the trivial, made clear the breadth and variety of culture in Weimar around 1800.

=== Napoleonic Wars ===
The events of 1806, however, ripped into Bertuch's business, plunged into crisis by the political and military situation. From 1814 Bertuch functioned as (among other things) a publisher of political newspapers and pamphlets such as Nemesis and Das Oppositionsblatt. He spent his last years in retirement, dying in Weimar, where he was buried in the family vault. Goethe contributed to the eulogy, given by Friedrich von Müller, chancellor of the duchy of Saxe-Weimar

== Works ==
- Polyxena (1775)
- Bilderbuch für Kinder enthaltend eine angenehme Sammlung von Thieren, Pflanzen, Blumen, Früchten, Mineralien, Trachten und allerhand andern unterrichtenden Gegenständen aus dem Reiche der Natur, der Künste und Wissenschaften; alle nach den besten Originalen gewählt, gestochen, und mit einer kurzen wissenschaftlichen, und den Verstandes-Kräften eines Kindes angemessenen Erklärung begleitet von F. J. Bertuch. 12 Vol. Weimar, im Verlage des Industrie-Comptoirs, 1792-1830.
