= Allgemeine Literatur-Zeitung =

German literary journal, 1785–1849

The Allgemeine Literatur-Zeitung was a literary journal founded in Jena in 1785 and discontinued in Halle in 1849. It was launched with the aim of reviewing and critically accompanying the entire current literary production of the time. It became the highest-circulation and most influential German-language newspaper of its kind during this period.

== History ==
Founded by the publisher and patron Friedrich Justin Bertuch together with the literature professor at the University of Jena Christian Gottfried Schütz and the Weimar poet and writer Christoph Martin Wieland. The newspaper attracted more than 2,000 subscribers, and started publishing daily just two years later. Its best-known contributors included Johann Wolfgang von Goethe, Friedrich Schiller, Immanuel Kant, Johann Gottlieb Fichte and Alexander von Humboldt. The works reviewed in the Allgemeine Literatur-Zeitung between 1785 and 1800 were indexed in the Schriftenverzeichnis Allgemeines Repertorium der Literatur (Weimar 1793–1807).

In 1804 Schütz accepted a professorship in literary history and rhetoric in Halle (Saale), having moved the place of publication of the Allgemeine Literatur-Zeitung to that city as early as 1803. He continued to publish the newspaper there together with the professor and librarian Johann Samuel Ersch.

Starting in January 1804, an offshoot off the journal, named the Jenaische Allgemeine Literatur-Zeitung appeared, at Goethe's instigation beginning in August 1803. Goethe felt compelled to take this step because he feared the decline of the status of the university in Jena. He recruited the Jena classical philologist Heinrich Karl Abraham Eichstädt as the chief editor. Both literary newspapers, the Jenaische and Hallesche, were initially in competition with each other. However, the Jenaische Literaturzeitung opened itself more and more to the new political and philosophical directions and regularly included contributions from the fields of medicine, anthropology and natural science, whereas the Hallesche Zeitung, with Schütz, remained true to Kantian philosophy and suffered from increasing decline over the following years.

The Jenaische Literaturzeitung very quickly surpassed the Hallesche in type and scope. In a preface to the 1812 edition, it was mentioned that there were already over 600 contributors to the newspaper. Articles on the "fine arts" were often accompanied by the byline "W.K.F.", an abbreviation for the "Weimar Friends of the Arts" (Weimarer Kunstfreunde). Heinrich Meyer was often the author, but Goethe and Schiller also used this signet. During the years 1804 to 1837, the newspaper appeared three times a week. The frequency of publication was then gradually reduced until it finally appeared only monthly, finally ceasing publication in 1841.

After the Allgemeine Literatur-Zeitung in Halle also ceased publication in 1849, its place in the world of German letters was taken by the Literarisches Centralblatt für Deutschland, founded by Friedrich Zarncke in Leipzig in 1850, until it closed down in 1944.
