= Geographical Institute of Weimar =

- Native name: Geographisches Institut Weimar
- Company type: Map publisher
- Industry: Cartography, publishing
- Founded: 1804
- Headquarters: Weimar, Germany
- Key people: Friedrich Justin Bertuch (manager)
- Products: Globes, maps, yearbooks

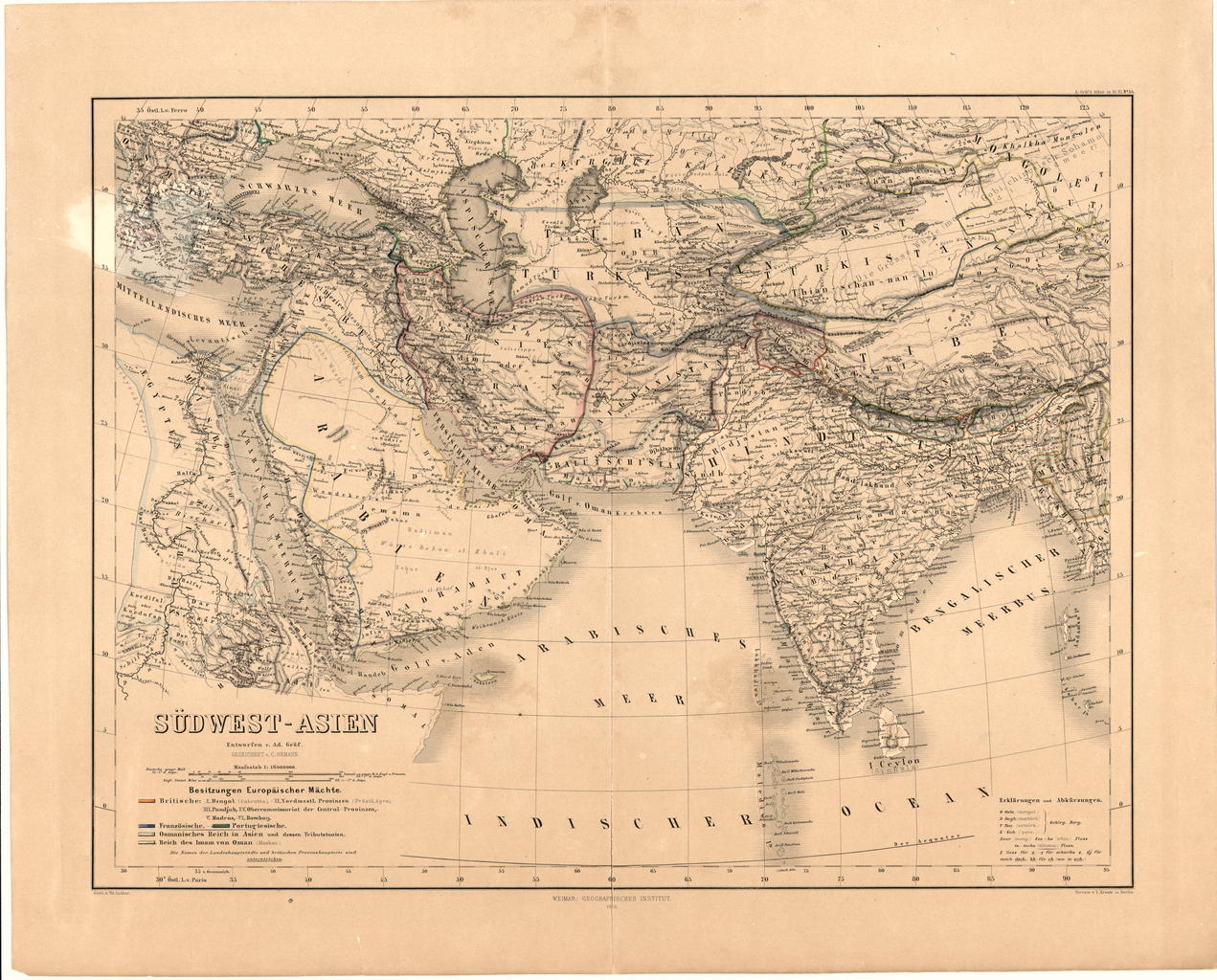
Southwest Asia by Leopold Kraatz and Thomas Luther, 1866, published Geographical Institute of Weimar

Geographical Institute of Weimar (German: Geographisches Institut Weimar) was a German map publisher. It was based in Weimar, Germany. The company was founded in 1804 and made globes, yearbooks, and maps. Friedrich Justin Bertuch managed the company upon its founding. Adam Christian Gaspari and Heinrich Kiepert worked there.
