= Krevese =

- Stadtteil of Osterburg (Altmark)
- Coat of arms
- Interactive map of Krevese
- Location within Germany Location within Saxony-Anhalt
- Coordinates: 52°49′00″N 11°41′42″E
- Country: Germany
- State: Saxony-Anhalt
- District: Stendal
- Town: Osterburg (Altmark)

Area
  - Total: 22.15 km^{2} (8.55 sq mi)
- Elevation: 39 m (128 ft)

Population (2006-12-31)
  - Total: 531
  - Density: 24.0/km^{2} (62.1/sq mi)
- Time zone: UTC+01:00 (CET)
  - Summer (DST): UTC+02:00 (CEST)
- Postal codes: 39606
- Dialling codes: 03937
- Vehicle registration: SDL
- Website: www.osterburg.de

Krevese is a village and a former municipality in the district of Stendal, in Saxony-Anhalt, Germany. Since 1 July 2009, it is part of the town Osterburg (Altmark).

== History ==
In 956 Kribci was mentioned when Emperor Otto I gave Quedlinburg Abbey six slavic villages. Between 1170 und 1200 an abbey with Benedictine nuns, called „Marienthal“, was founded at Krevese. The monastery was converted into an evangelical virgin monastery in the course of the Reformation in 1541, but only for a short time. In 1562 the administrator of Havelberg, Joachim III Frederick of Brandenburg, ceded the former abbey to the Bismarck family, who had to swap it against Burgstall in the Altmark. It remained owned by the family until 1819.

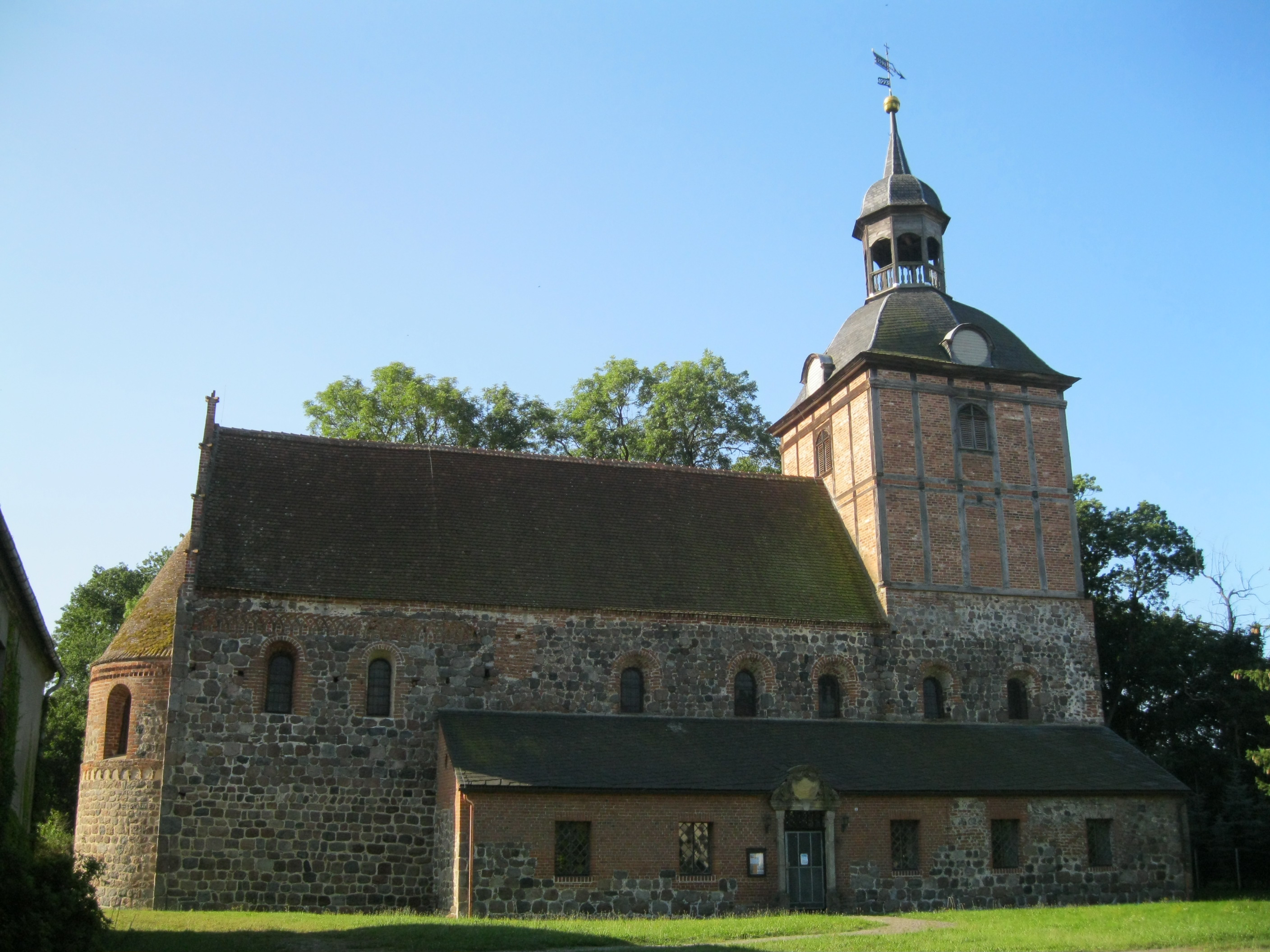
Former abbey church

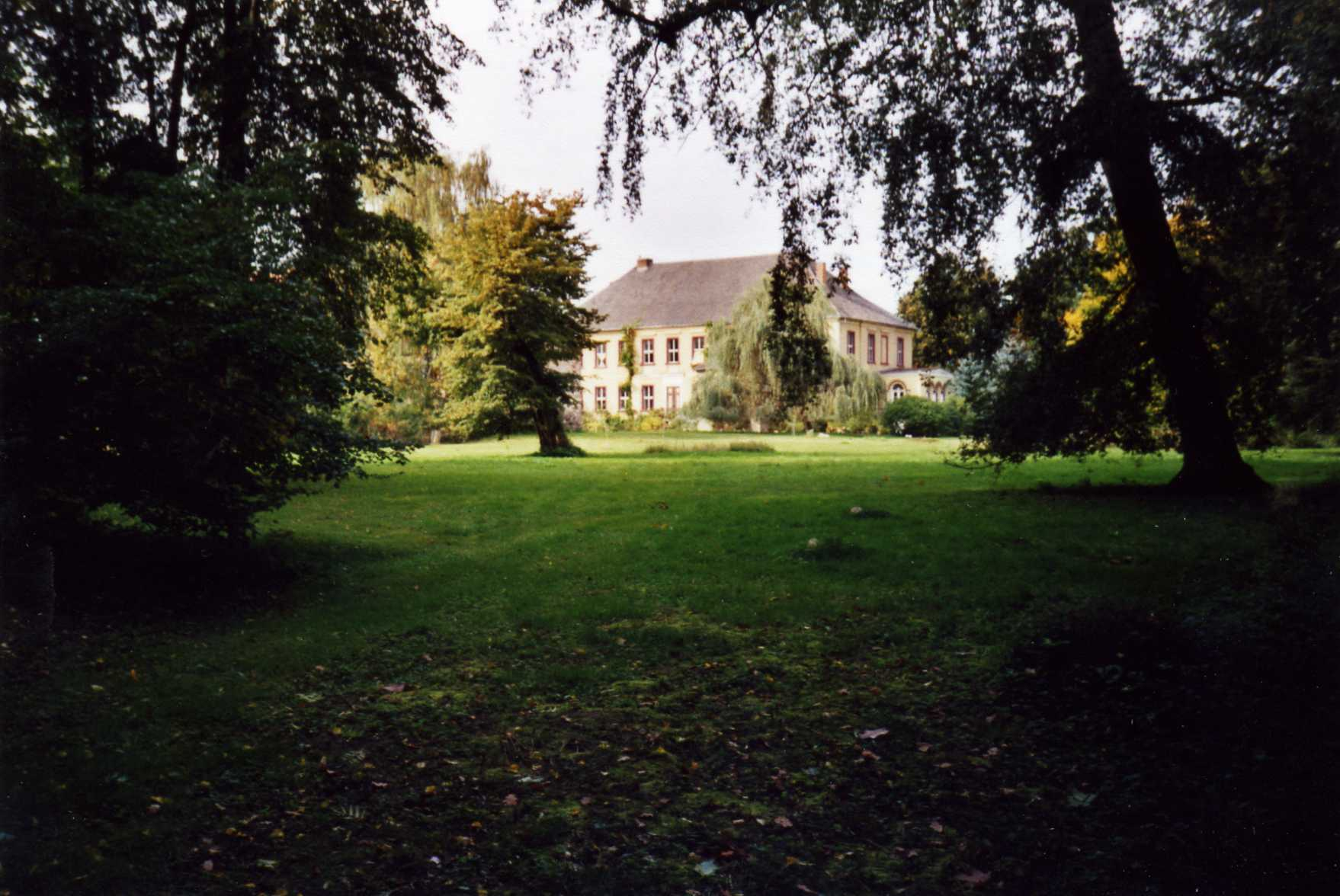
Former manor house of the Bismarck family
