= Flessau =

- Stadtteil of Osterburg (Altmark)
- Interactive map of Flessau
- Location within Germany Location within Saxony-Anhalt
- Coordinates: 52°45′47″N 11°40′0″E
- Country: Germany
- State: Saxony-Anhalt
- District: Stendal
- Town: Osterburg (Altmark)

Area
  - Total: 30.29 km^{2} (11.70 sq mi)
- Elevation: 27 m (89 ft)

Population (2006-12-31)
  - Total: 1,003
  - Density: 33.11/km^{2} (85.76/sq mi)
- Time zone: UTC+01:00 (CET)
  - Summer (DST): UTC+02:00 (CEST)
- Postal codes: 39606
- Dialling codes: 039392
- Vehicle registration: SDL
- Website: www.osterburg.de

Flessau is a village and a former municipality in the district of Stendal, in Saxony-Anhalt, Germany. Since 1 July 2009, it is part of the town Osterburg (Altmark).

== Geography ==
Flessau, a village with a church, lies six kilometers southwest of Osterburg (Altmark) and 22 kilometers northwest of Stendal. The gently rolling area around Flessau is crossed by numerous ditches, such as the Markgraben and the Kleiner Markgraben, which drain northward to the Biese.

Neighbouring towns are Schmersau and Orpensdorf in the west, Klein Rossau and Groß Rossau in the northwest, Schliecksdorf in the north, Storbeck in the northeast, Klein Ballerstedt and Ballerstedt in the southeast, Grävenitz in the south and Wollenrade in the southwest.
