= Gladigau =

- Stadtteil of Osterburg (Altmark)
- Interactive map of Gladigau
- Location within Germany Location within Saxony-Anhalt
- Coordinates: 52°46′N 11°34′E
- Country: Germany
- State: Saxony-Anhalt
- District: Stendal
- Town: Osterburg (Altmark)

Area
  - Total: 15.50 km^{2} (5.98 sq mi)
- Elevation: 27 m (89 ft)

Population (2006-12-31)
  - Total: 369
  - Density: 23.8/km^{2} (61.7/sq mi)
- Time zone: UTC+01:00 (CET)
  - Summer (DST): UTC+02:00 (CEST)
- Postal codes: 39606
- Dialling codes: 039392
- Vehicle registration: SDL
- Website: www.osterburg.de

Gladigau is a village and a former municipality in the district of Stendal, in Saxony-Anhalt, Germany. Since 1 July 2009, it is part of the town Osterburg (Altmark).
