= Walsleben, Saxony-Anhalt =

Walsleben
- Stadtteil of Osterburg (Altmark)
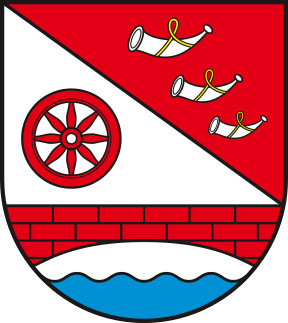
- Coat of arms
- Interactive map of Walsleben
- Location within Germany Location within Saxony-Anhalt
- Coordinates: 52°45′35″N 11°50′59″E
- Country: Germany
- State: Saxony-Anhalt
- District: Stendal
- Town: Osterburg (Altmark)

Area
  - Total: 13.07 km^{2} (5.05 sq mi)
- Elevation: 23 m (75 ft)

Population (2006-12-31)
  - Total: 451
  - Density: 34.5/km^{2} (89.4/sq mi)
- Time zone: UTC+01:00 (CET)
  - Summer (DST): UTC+02:00 (CEST)
- Postal codes: 39606
- Dialling codes: 039388
- Vehicle registration: SDL
- Website: www.osterburg.de

Walsleben is a village and a former municipality in the district of Stendal, in Saxony-Anhalt, Germany. Since 1 July 2009, it is part of the town Osterburg (Altmark).
