= Königsmark =

- Stadtteil of Osterburg (Altmark)
- Coat of arms
- Interactive map of Königsmark
- Location within Germany Location within Saxony-Anhalt
- Coordinates: 52°47′48″N 11°50′35″E
- Country: Germany
- State: Saxony-Anhalt
- District: Stendal
- Town: Osterburg (Altmark)

Area
  - Total: 34.21 km^{2} (13.21 sq mi)
- Elevation: 22 m (72 ft)

Population (2006-12-31)
  - Total: 516
  - Density: 15.1/km^{2} (39.1/sq mi)
- Time zone: UTC+01:00 (CET)
  - Summer (DST): UTC+02:00 (CEST)
- Postal codes: 39606
- Dialling codes: 039390
- Vehicle registration: SDL
- Website: www.osterburg.de

Königsmark is a village and a former municipality in the district of Stendal, in Saxony-Anhalt, Germany. Since 1 July 2009, it has been part of the town of Osterburg (Altmark).

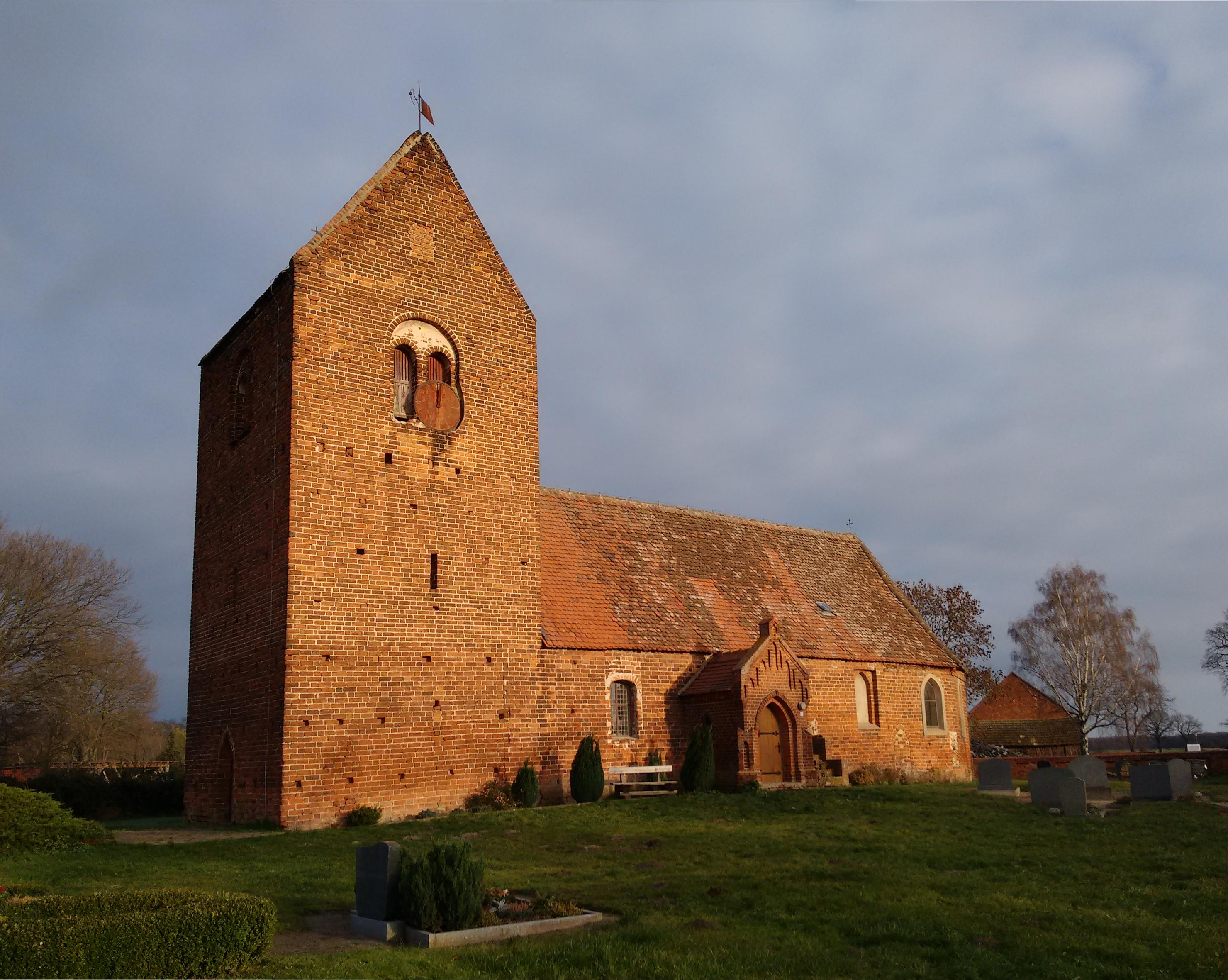
Church in Königsmark-Wolterslage
