= Kuanjie Protestant Church =

Church in Dongcheng district, Beijing

Coordinates: 39.93165°N 116.39461°E

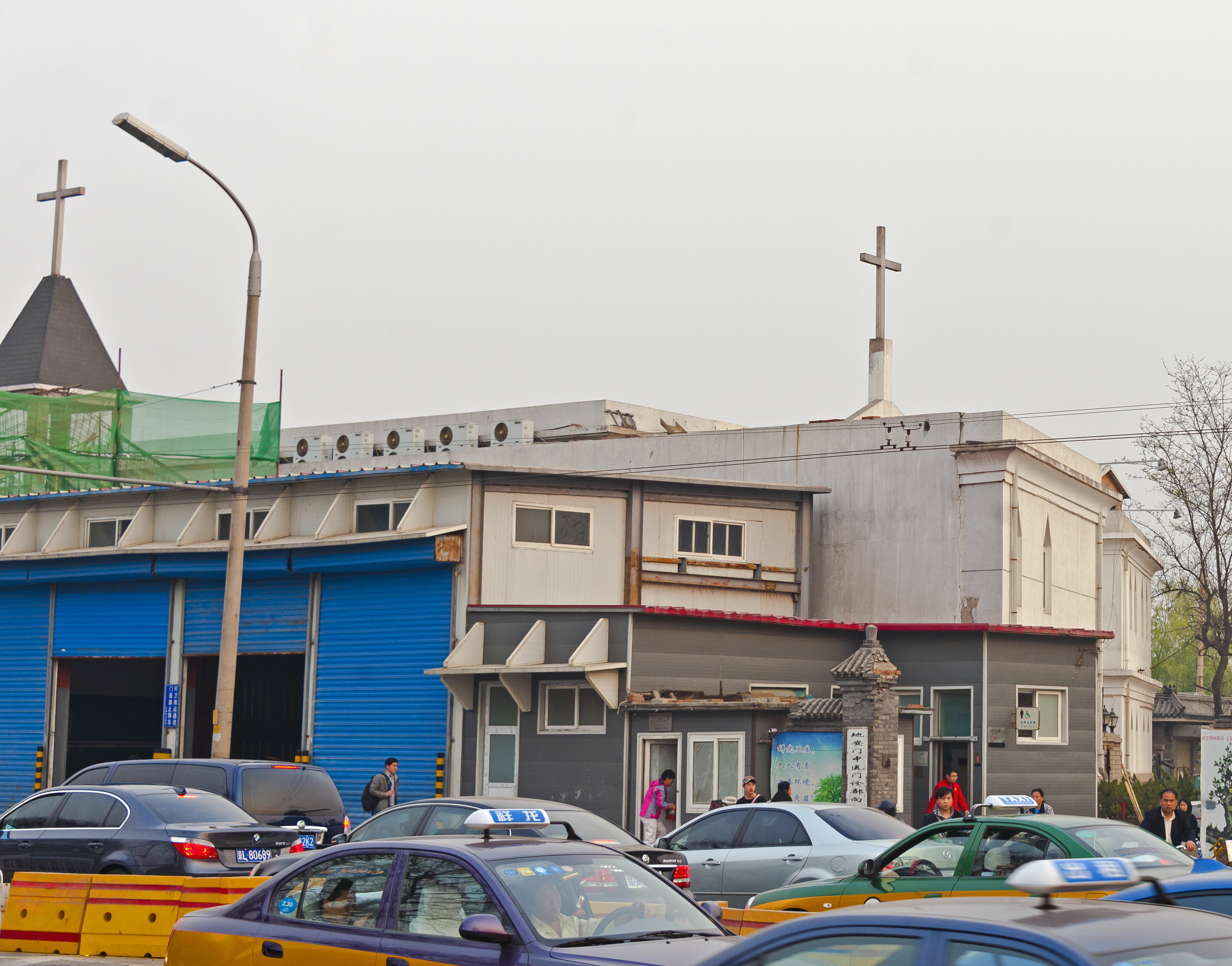
The Kuanjie Church seen from across nearby Di'anmen East Street

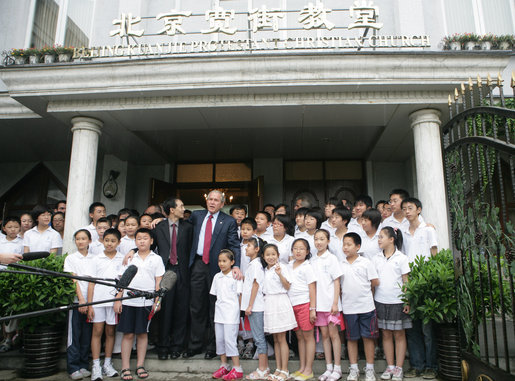
U.S. President George W. Bush visiting the Kuanjie Protestant Church during the 2008 Beijing Olympics

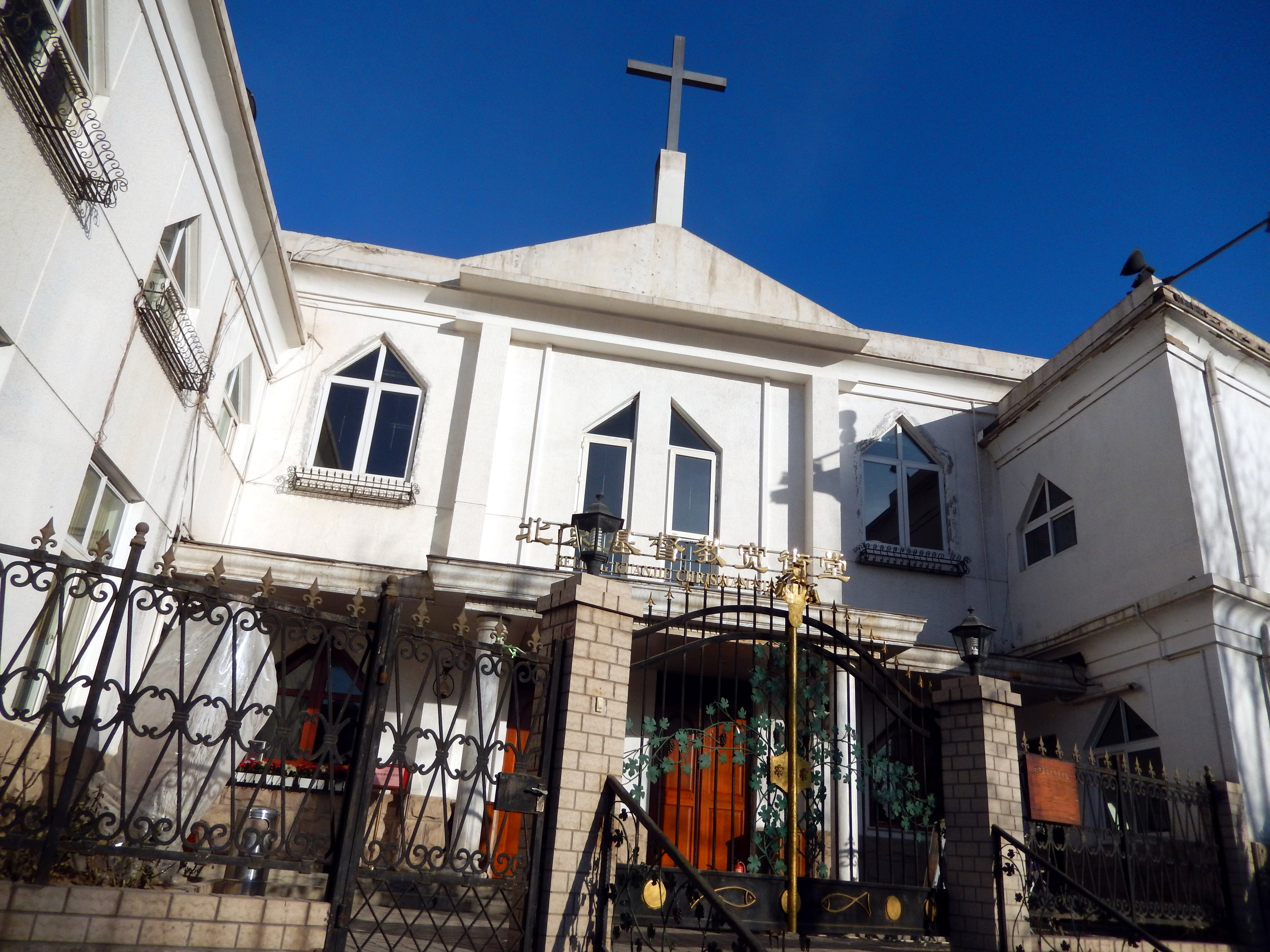
The Kuanjie Church

The Kuanjie Protestant Church (Chinese: 宽街教堂) is a state church in the Dongcheng District of Beijing, China. It is operated by the Three-Self Patriotic Movement.
