= Osterburg (Altmark) =

- Town
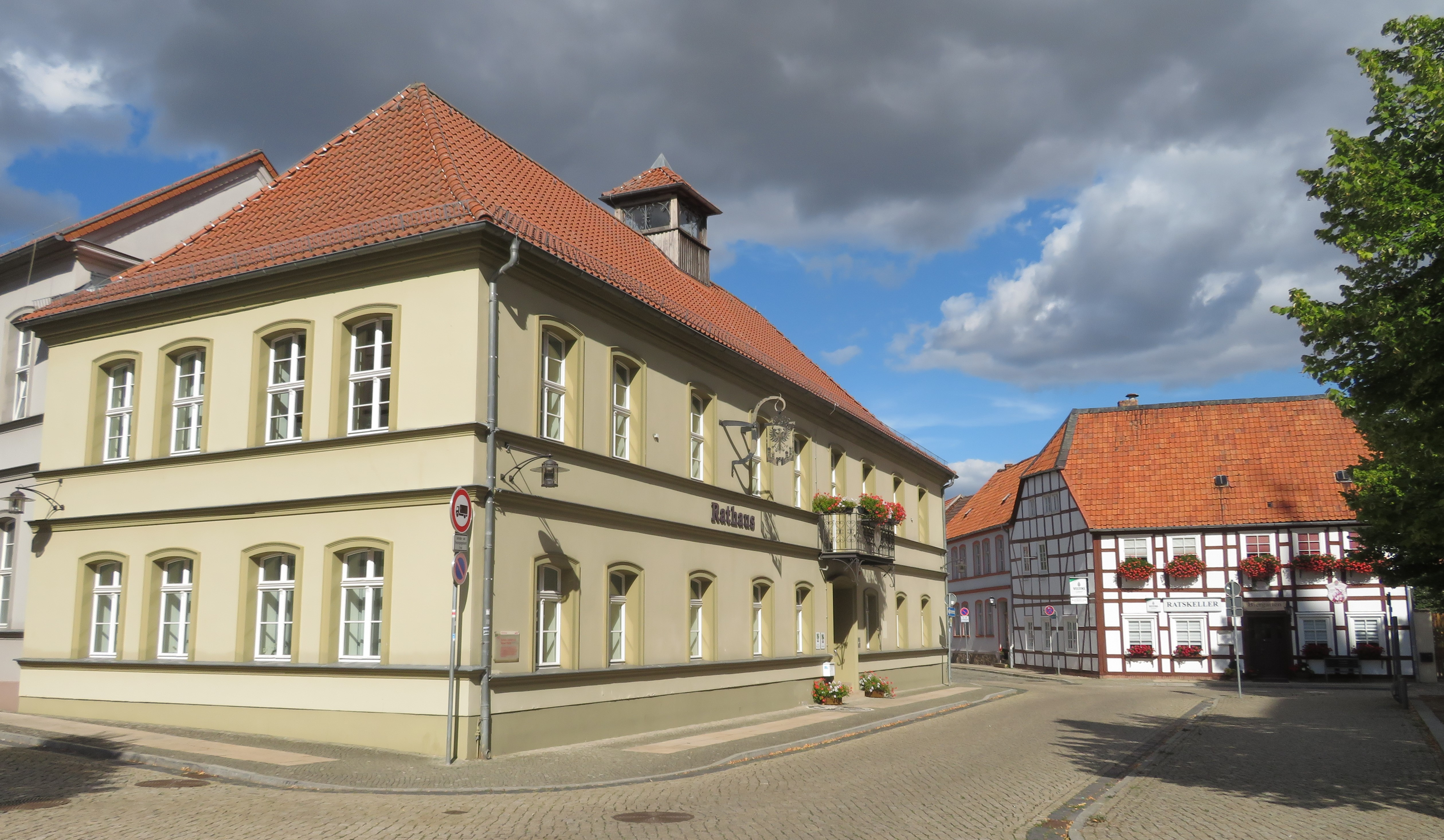
- Town Hall

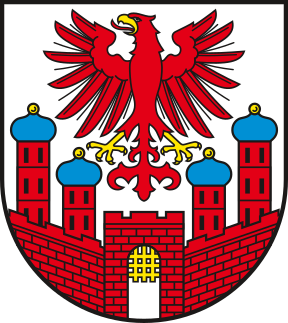
- Coat of arms

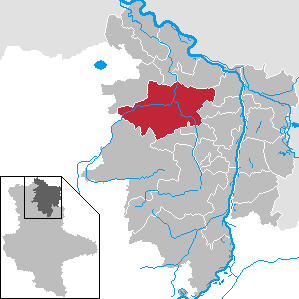
- Location of Osterburg within Stendal district
- Interactive map of Osterburg
- Location within Germany Location within Saxony-Anhalt
- Coordinates: 52°47′N 11°46′E
- Country: Germany
- State: Saxony-Anhalt
- District: Stendal
- Subdivisions: 4

Government
  - Mayor (2018–25): Nico Schulz (CDU)

Area
  - Total: 229.77 km^{2} (88.71 sq mi)
- Elevation: 26 m (85 ft)

Population (2025-12-31)
  - Total: 9,274
  - Density: 40.36/km^{2} (104.5/sq mi)
- Time zone: UTC+01:00 (CET)
  - Summer (DST): UTC+02:00 (CEST)
- Postal codes: 39606
- Dialling codes: 03937
- Vehicle registration: SDL
- Website: www.osterburg.de

Osterburg (German: [ˈoːstɐbʊʁk]; Low German: Osterborg) is a town in the district of Stendal, in Saxony-Anhalt, Germany, situated approximately 22 kilometres (14 miles) northwest of Stendal.

== Geography ==
The town Osterburg consists of the following 11 Ortschaften or municipal divisions:

- Ballerstedt
- Düsedau
- Erxleben
- Flessau
- Gladigau
- Königsmark
- Krevese
- Meseberg
- Osterburg
- Rossau
- Walsleben

Ballerstedt, Düsedau, Erxleben, Flessau, Gladigau, Königsmark, Krevese, Meseberg, Rossau and Walsleben are former municipalities that were absorbed into Osterburg in July 2009.

== History ==
In the 1990s scanty wooden relics of a castle and ceramics were unearthed behind the municipal library in the Market Place (Großer Markt). The castle was built in the second half of the 10th century and inhabited until 1100 approximately. The town's name (burg meaning "castle") could refer to this castle.

The oldest document in which Osterburg was mentioned was written in 1208, and it was described as "oppidum et castrum", i.e. a town with a castle. Osterburg became a member of the Hanseatic League in 1359, and had about 1,500 inhabitants at the end of the Middle Ages. Two thirds of the town burnt down in 1761.

== Sights ==
After the town hall dating from 1668 had burnt down in 1761 the present town hall was built in 1771. It was renovated and enlarged in 1879 and 1905.

Most of the medieval city wall was demolished in the 19th century, but a small part was left and can be visited beside the school Markgraf-Albrecht-Gymnasium.

Saint Nikolai Church was built in a romanic style with three naves in 1188. In the 15th century it was transformed into a gothic hall church which was renovated in 1890. Its pulpit dates from 1598. The baptismal font was made of bronze in 1442 and the organ dates from 1824.

The Neptune Fountain in front of the church was made in Italy at the beginning of the 20th century. Originally it belonged to the castle of Rönnebeck, a village about 8 km from Osterburg. The castle was demolished in 1947 and the statue was placed in the Market Place of Osterburg in 1950.

The museum Osterburger Kreisheimatmuseum which was founded in 1936 is in a half-timbered house dating from 1762. The municipal library is in Kreyenbergsches Haus, a half-timbered house dating from 1770 at the Market Place (Großer Markt).

St. Martin's Chapel in the eastern part of Osterburg outside the historical centre was founded in the 12th century and transformed into a small neogothic church in 1868. The oldest part of the building consisting of rubble and small glacial erratics is clearly recognizable.

In the northwest of Osterburg a small hill can be seen which is called Burgwall (Castle Hill). This name might refer to the first settlement which developed into the town of Osterburg.

Krumke, a village about 3 km from Osterburg which was incorporated into the town, is known for its castle and its park.

== Sports ==
Biesebad is a public bathing site on river Biese in the northern part of Osterburg. The first bathing facilities were founded in the 19th century already.

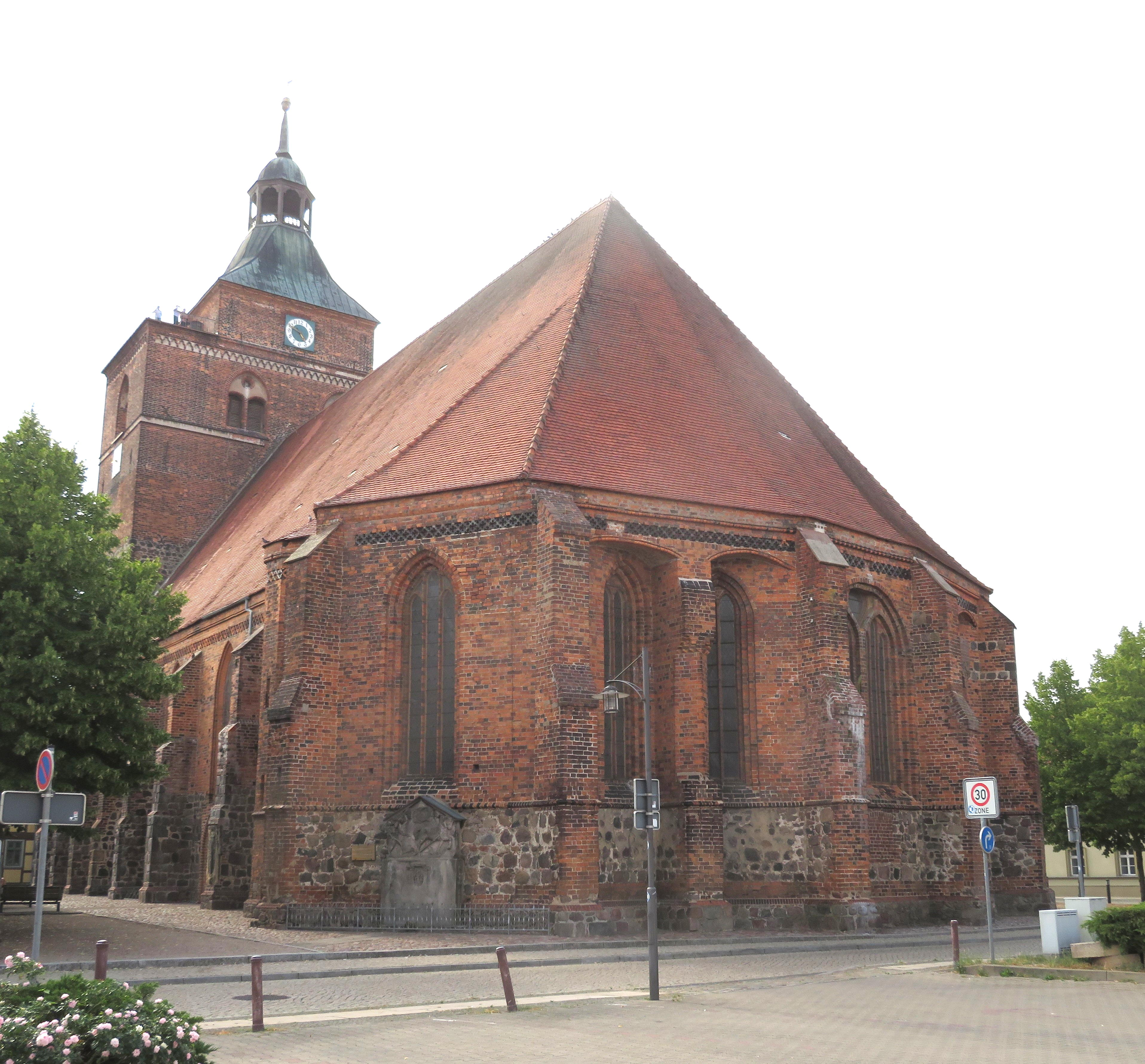
St. Nikolai Church

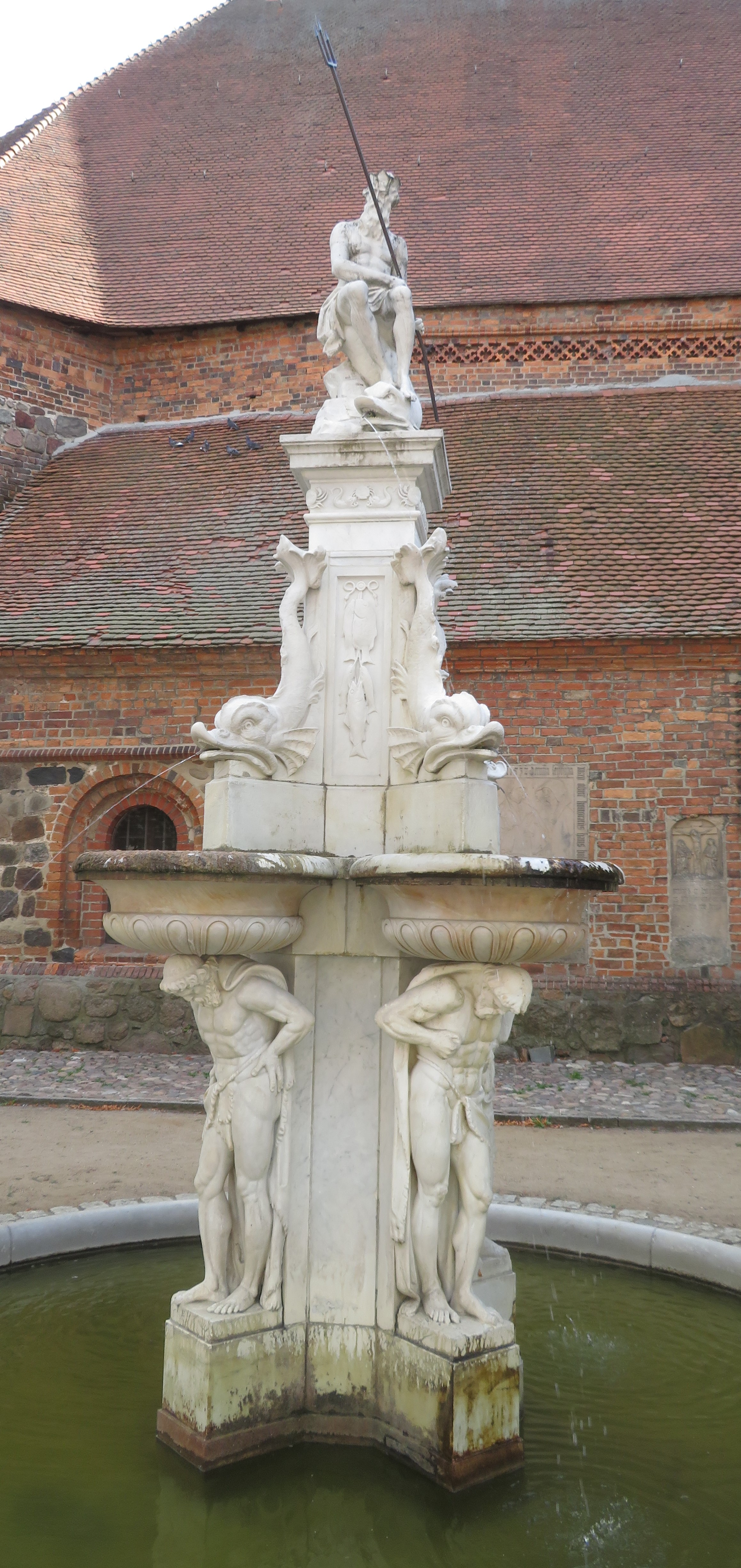
Neptune Fountain

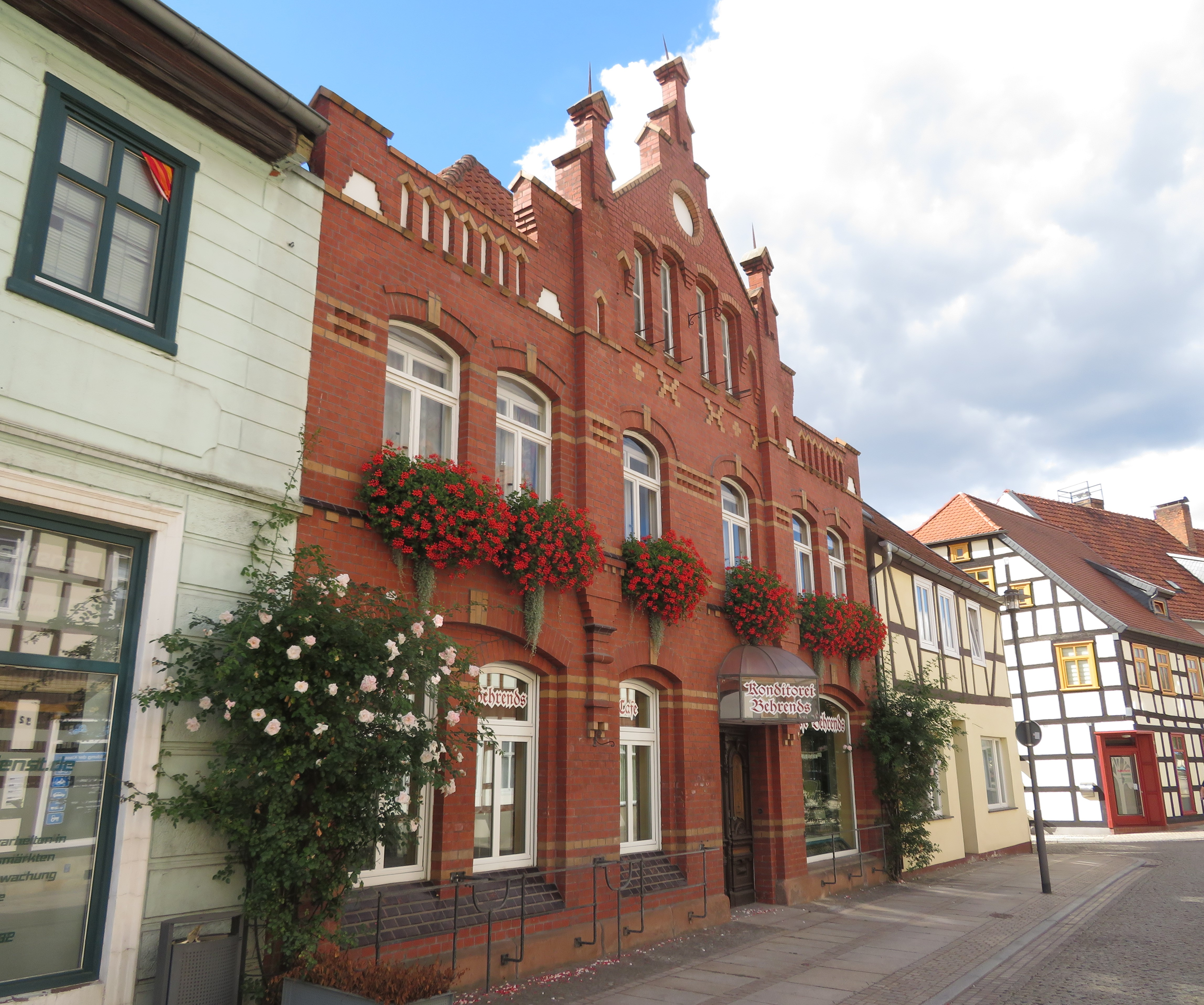
Main street (Breite Straße), western part

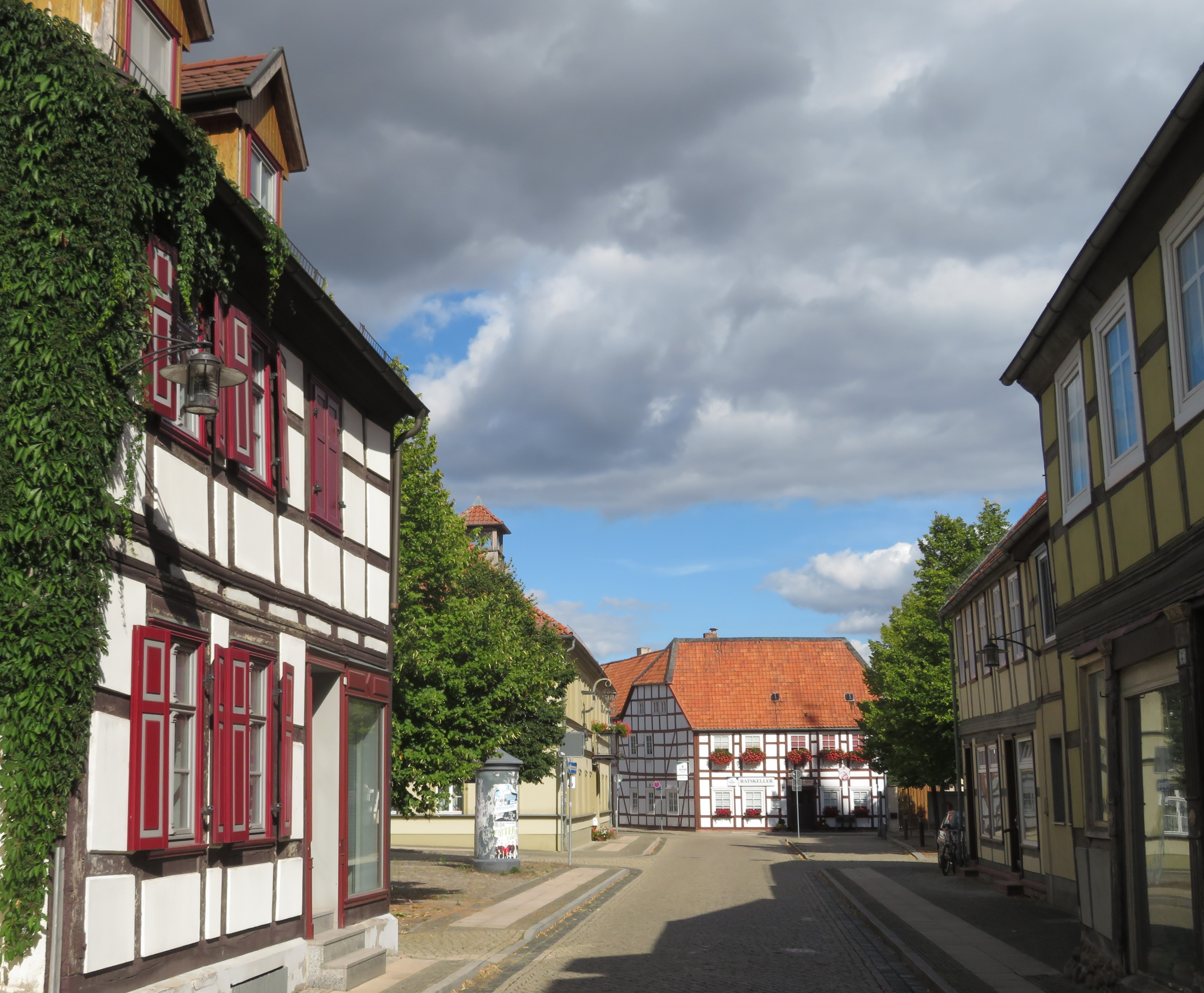
Market Place (Kleiner Markt)

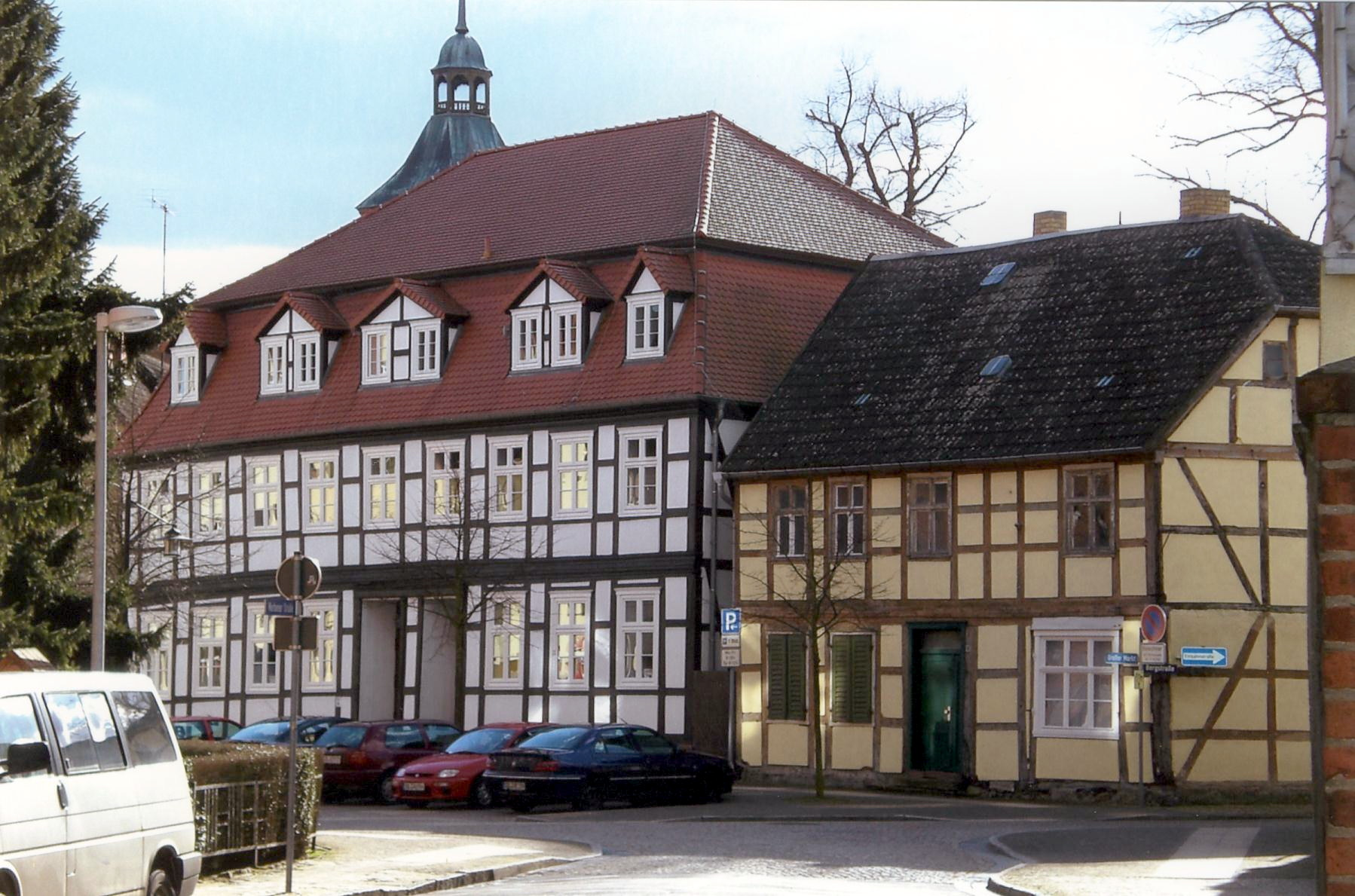
Kreyenbergsches Haus (left)

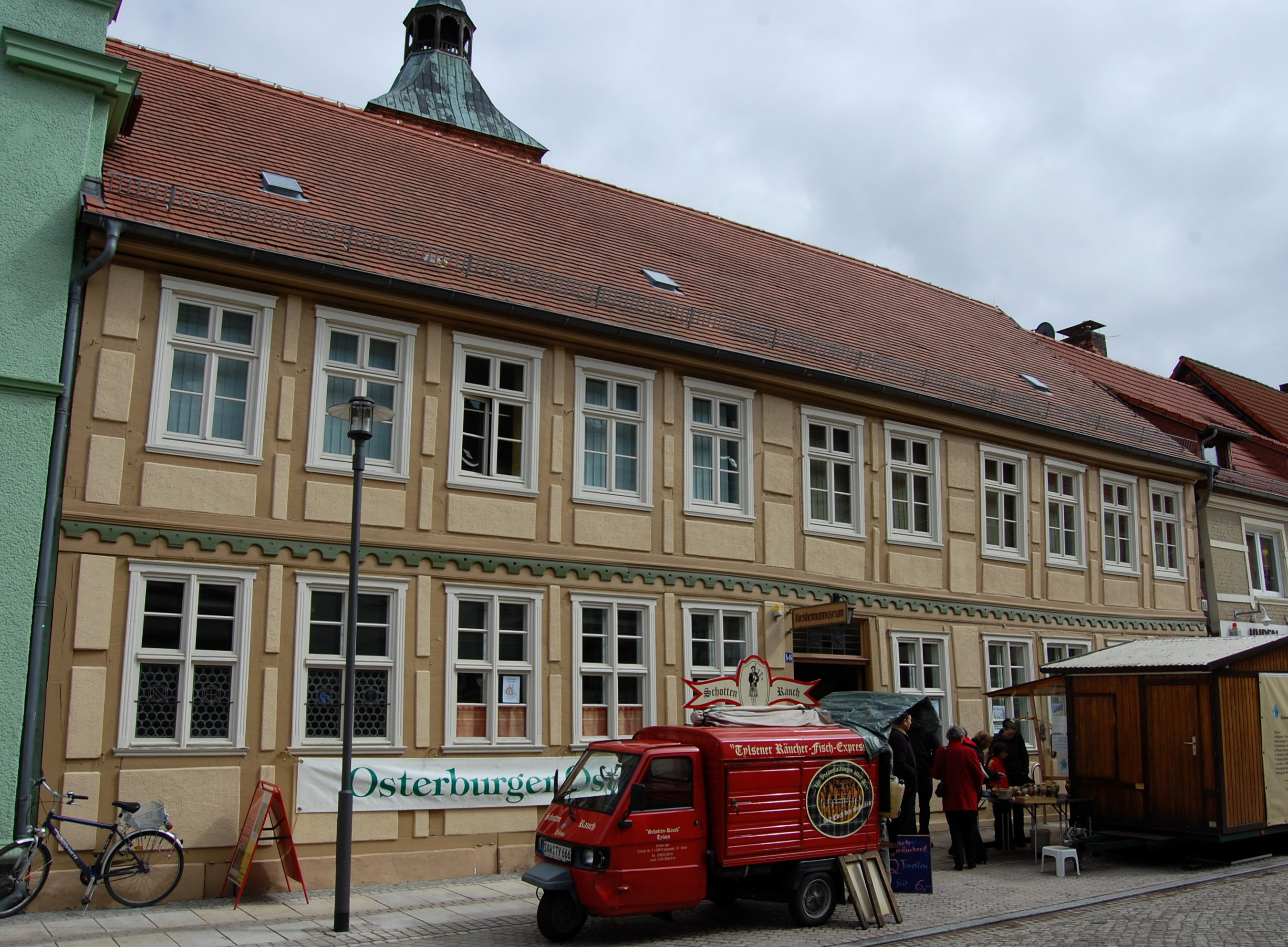
Museum (Kreisheimatmuseum)

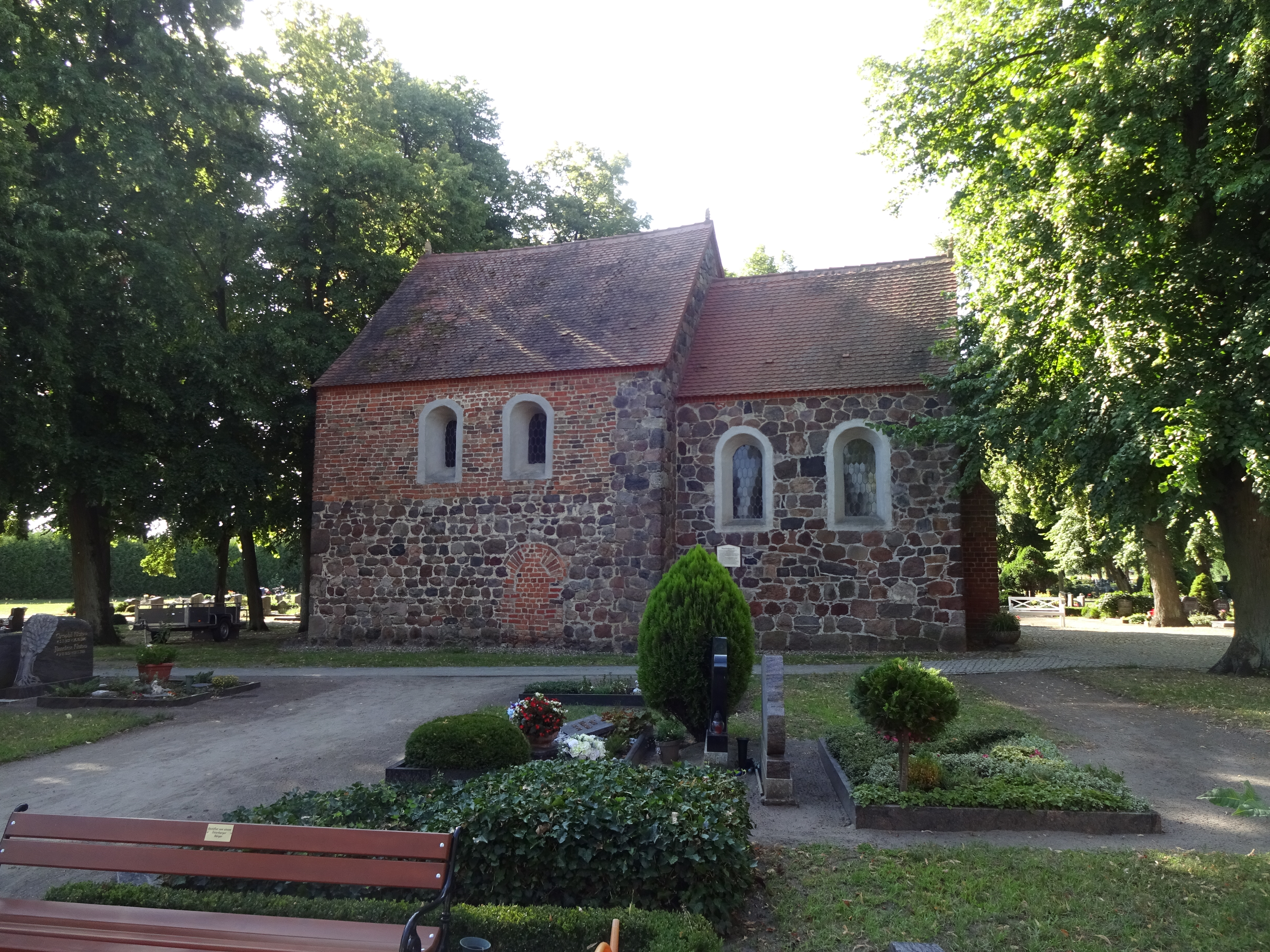
St. Martin's Chapel

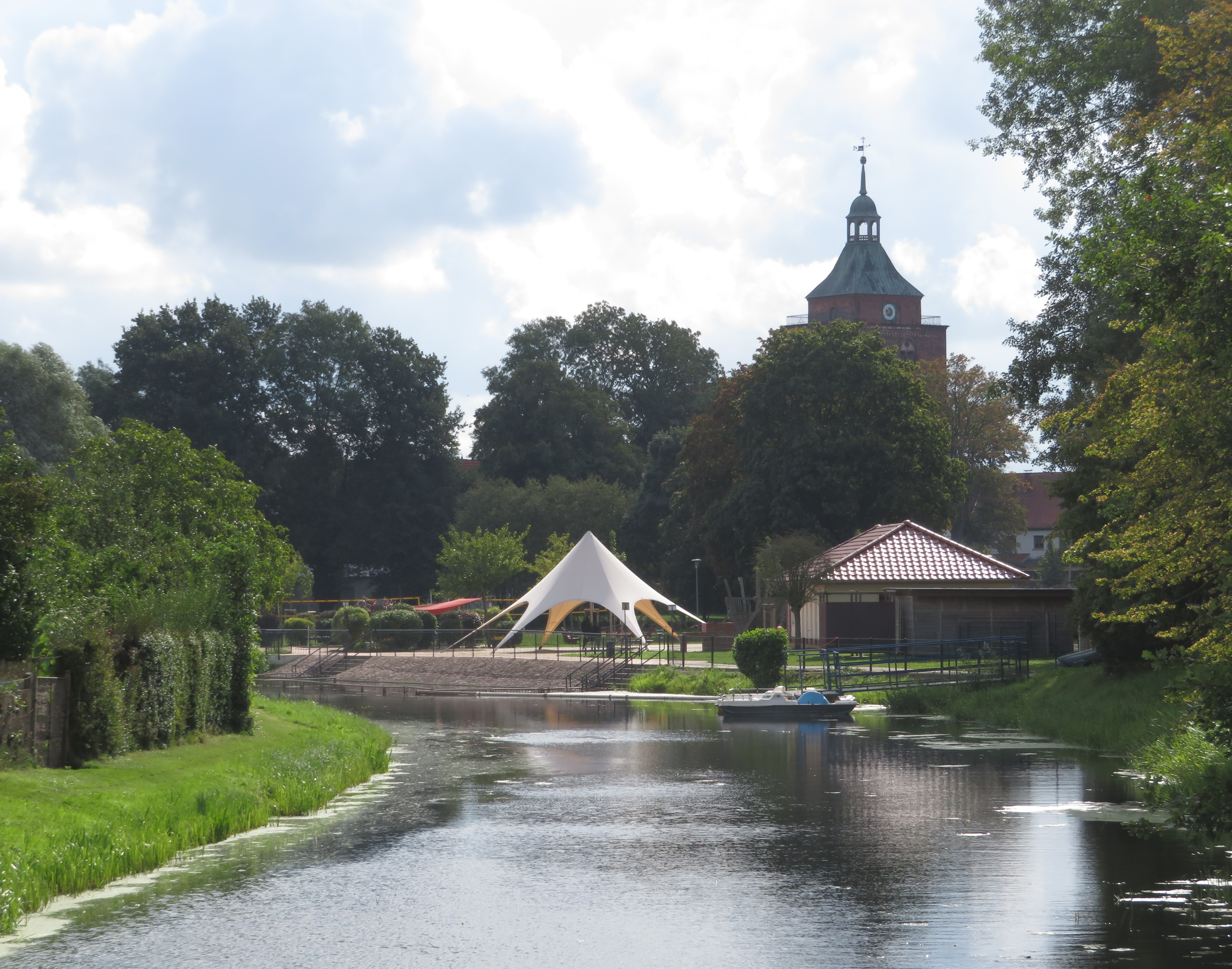
Public bathing site in river Biese

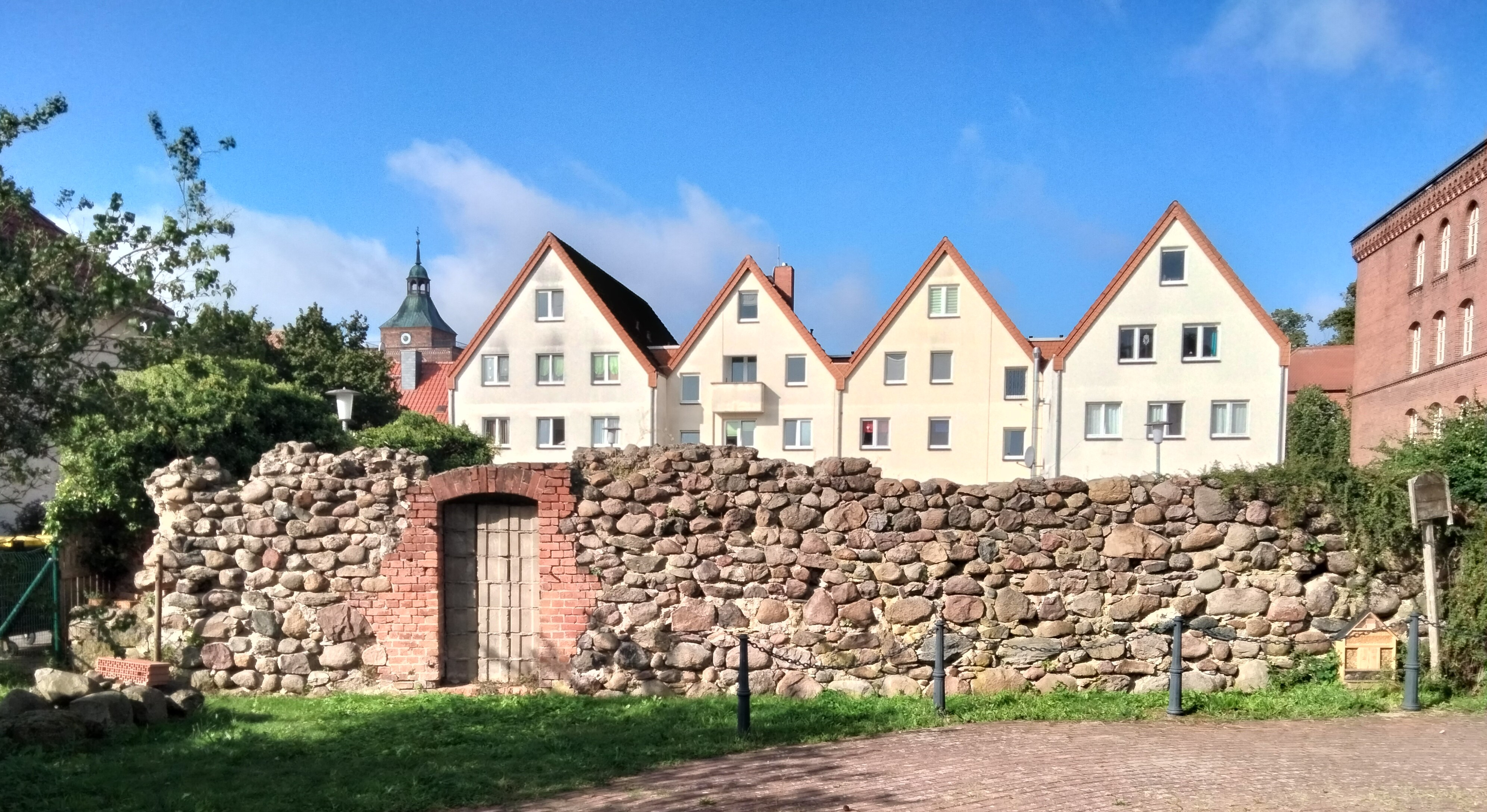
Medieval city wall

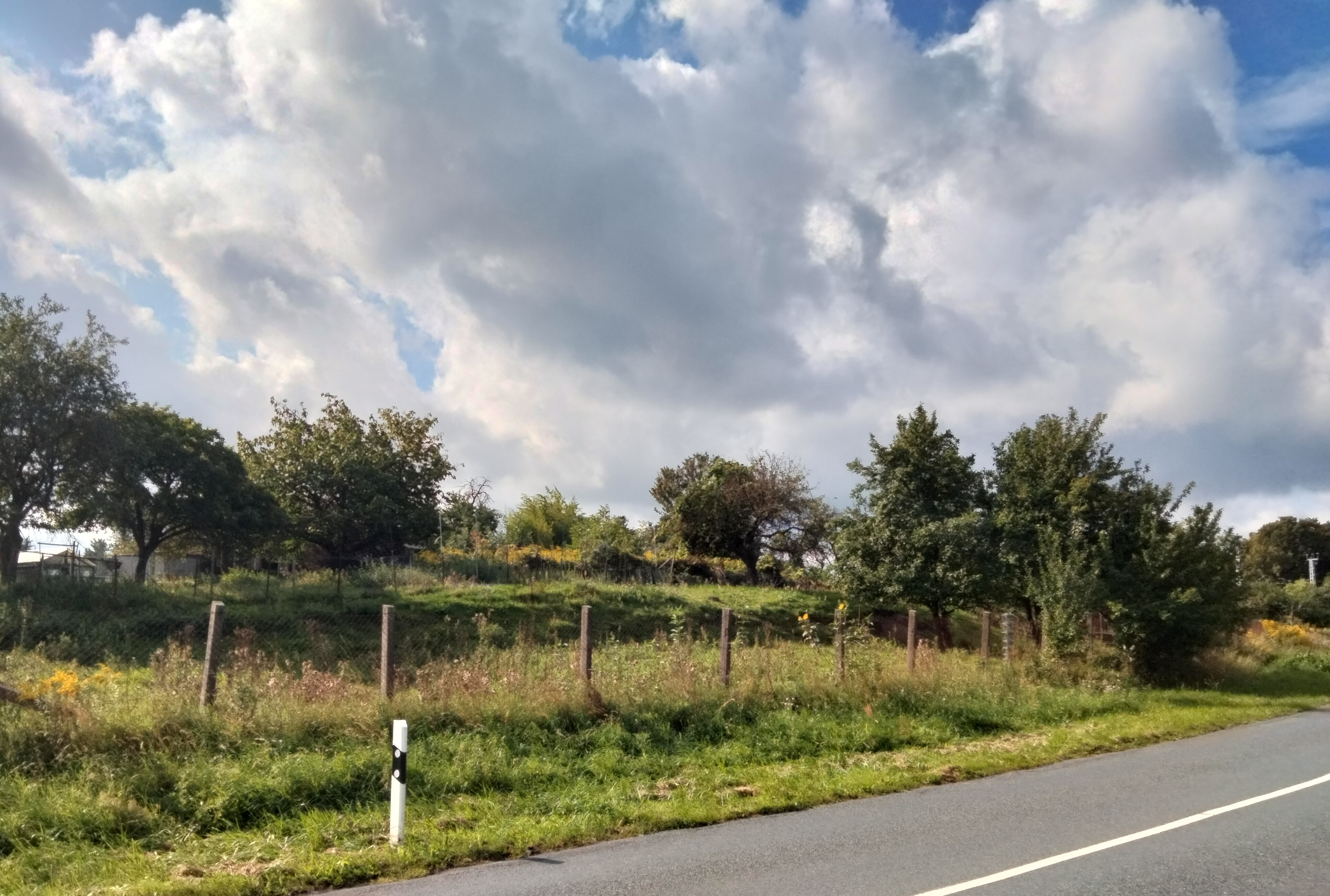
Burgwall

== International relations ==
Osterburg is twinned with:

- Wieluń, Poland

== People from Osterburg ==
- Friedrich Wilhelm Weidemann (1668–1750), court painter for Frederick I of Prussia
- Franz Ludwig Güssefeld (1744–1807), cartographer
- Richard Armstedt (1851-1931), historian
- Georg Lindemann (1884–1963), cavalry officer and field commander
- Rudolf Bamler (1896–1972), Wehrmacht general and later Stasi officer
- Wolfgang Abraham (1942–2013), soccer player
