= Rossau, Saxony-Anhalt =

Rossau
- Stadtteil of Osterburg (Altmark)
- Interactive map of Rossau
- Location within Germany Location within Saxony-Anhalt
- Coordinates: 52°46′59″N 11°38′35″E
- Country: Germany
- State: Saxony-Anhalt
- District: Stendal
- Town: Osterburg (Altmark)

Area
  - Total: 17.9 km^{2} (6.9 sq mi)
- Elevation: 24 m (79 ft)

Population (2006-12-31)
  - Total: 429
  - Density: 24.0/km^{2} (62.1/sq mi)
- Time zone: UTC+01:00 (CET)
  - Summer (DST): UTC+02:00 (CEST)
- Postal codes: 39606
- Dialling codes: 039392
- Vehicle registration: SDL
- Website: www.osterburg.de

Rossau (German pronunciation: [ˈʁɔsaʊ]) is a village and a former municipality in the district of Stendal, in Saxony-Anhalt, Germany. Since 1 July 2009, it is part of the town Osterburg (Altmark).
