= Johann Ernst Heinsius =

German painter

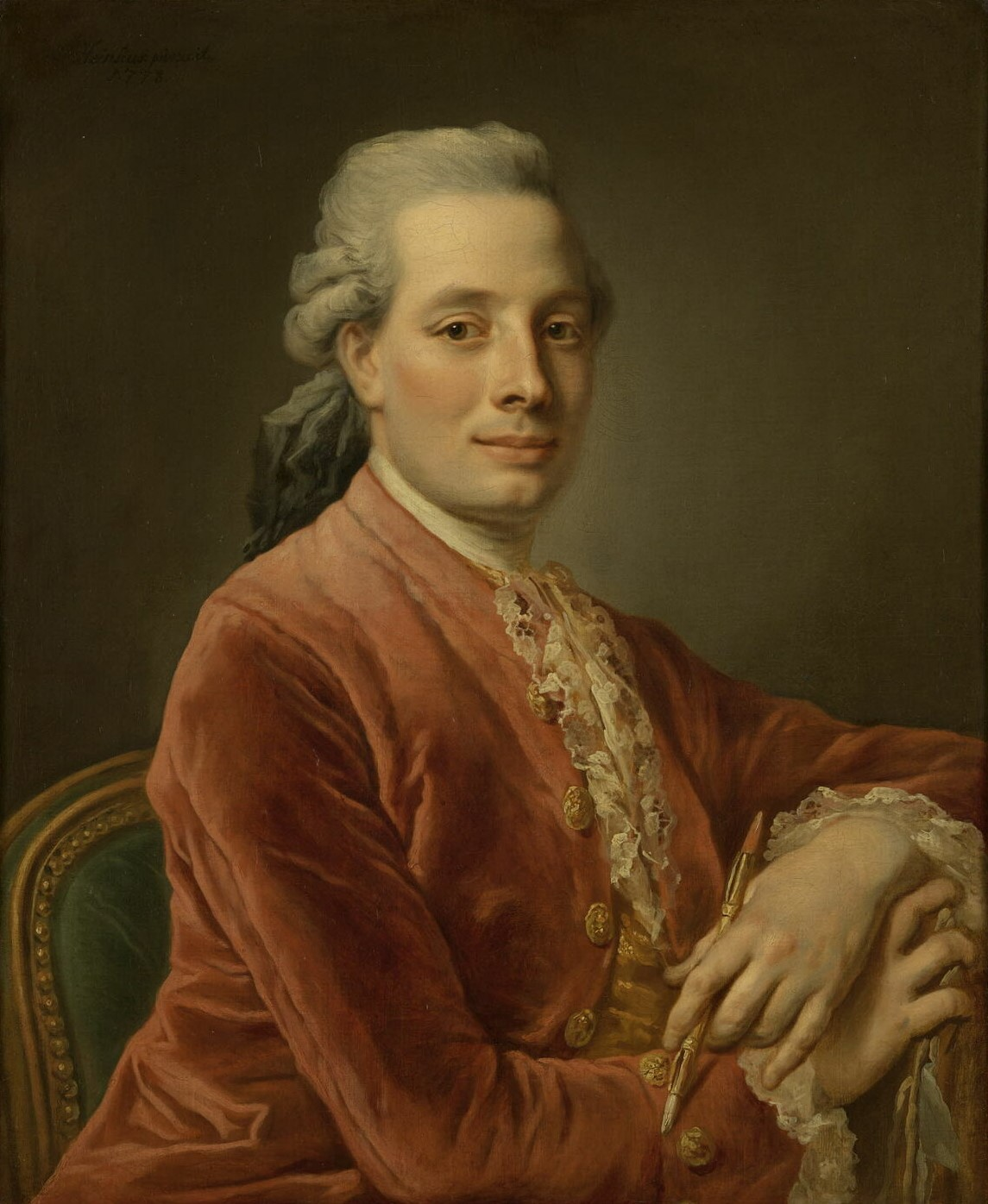
Self-portrait (1778)

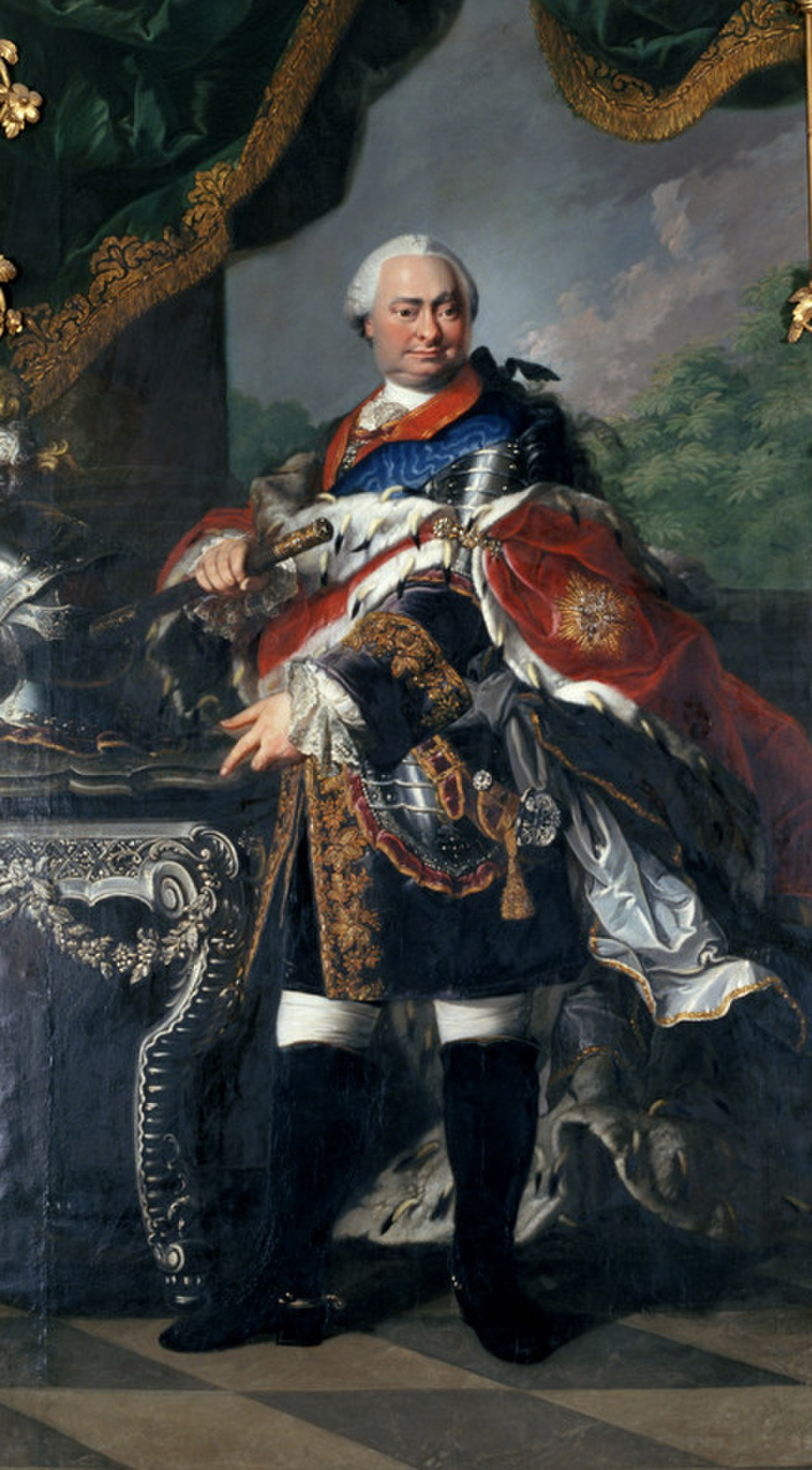
John Frederick, Prince of Schwarzburg-Rudolstadt

Johann Ernst Heinsius (German: [ˈjoːhan ʔɛʁnst ˈhaɪnzi̯ʊs]; 21 May 1731, Ilmenau - 18 October 1794, Erfurt) was a German portrait painter and miniaturist.

== Biography ==
His father was Johann Christian Heintz (c.1706-1756), a gunsmith who had become an artist at the court of Rudolstadt. In addition to his father, he may have studied with Carl Christlieb Reinthaler (?-1770), a local decorative painter. He made his name as a portrait painter working for several noblemen of Thuringia. His presence is testified to in Heidecksburg, Rudolstadt and in Hildburghausen as well, until 1769 when his patron, Duke Ernst Frederick III, was compelled to declare bankruptcy.

In 1772, he was engaged to oversee the picture gallery at Castle Wilhelmsburg in Weimar, but lost this position in 1774 when the castle burned down and the collection was destroyed. After the arrival of Karl August, Grand Duke of Saxe-Weimar-Eisenach, who was still just a boy, he was occasionally employed by Duchess Anna Amalia of Brunswick-Wolfenbüttel, the Grand Duke's mother. His portraits of them are among his best known, although some are reworkings of portraits by Johann Georg Ziesenis. Sometime during this period, he also created a portrait of Johann Wolfgang von Goethe.

Despite this limited success, his work in Weimar was always dogged by illnesses in the family, debt, and clinging relatives. In 1781, the Grand Duke granted him a three-year leave of absence, during which he was mostly resident in Hamburg, working for the wealthy bourgeoisie. His best known work from this period was a portrait of Johanna Margaretha Sieveking, the wife of Georg Heinrich Sieveking. When he returned to Weimar, he found that his family had squandered all of the money he had sent them. They apparently remained in this destitute state until 1788, when Georg Melchior Kraus helped him obtain a teaching position at the Weimar Princely Free Drawing School.

He was temporarily disabled by a stroke in 1792. Upon recovering, he went to Erfurt to carry out a commission, but died there in 1794.

His brother, Johann Julius Heinsius, also became a painter and emigrated to France. Their styles are similar and they are often confused.
