= Feuersteinklippe =

Coordinates: 51°46′00″N 10°40′36″E

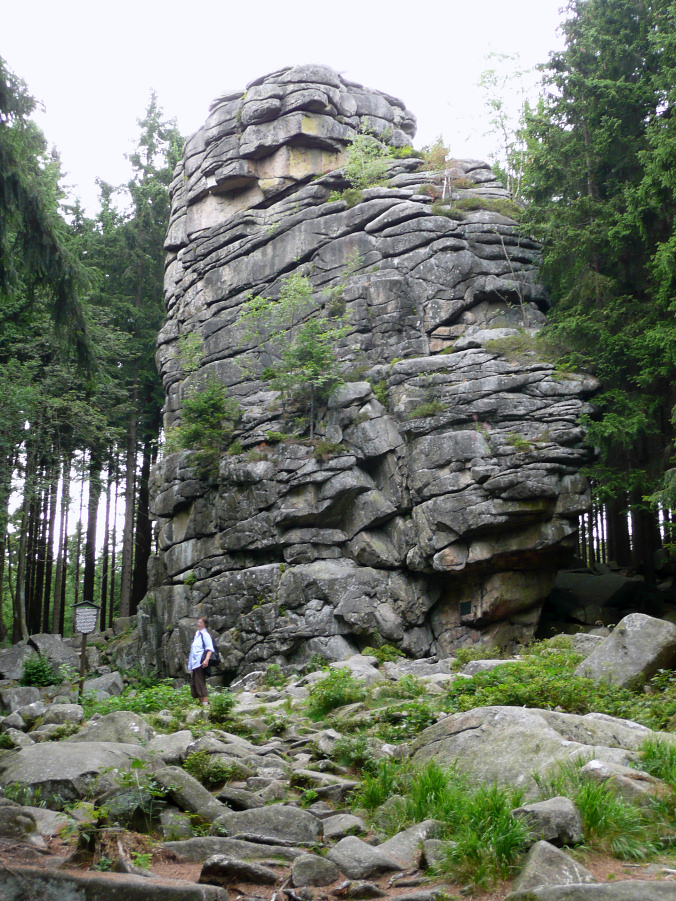
Feuersteinklippe

The Feuersteinklippe is a rock formation in the Harz National Park in central Germany and the landmark of the nearby village of Schierke.

The Feuersteinklippe is a butte made of granite, not flint (Feuerstein = "firestone" or flint) as the name suggests. It shows the spheroidal weathering typical of the Harz region. The striking rock formation is located at an elevation of 690 metres and is surrounded by woods. It lies to the north of Schierke station.

The name Feuersteinklippe is derived from the Schierker Feuersteinwiesen (Schierke Feuerstein meadows) that lie to the southeast, which in turn were named after the cultic fires or signal beacons originally lit at this spot.

An information board on the rocks recalls the visit of Goethe and the painter, Georg Melchior Kraus, who spent time here on 4 September 1784 in geological studies.

The well-known herbal liqueur, Schierker Feuerstein, which is made in Schierke, is named after the rocks. The label portrays the rock formation.

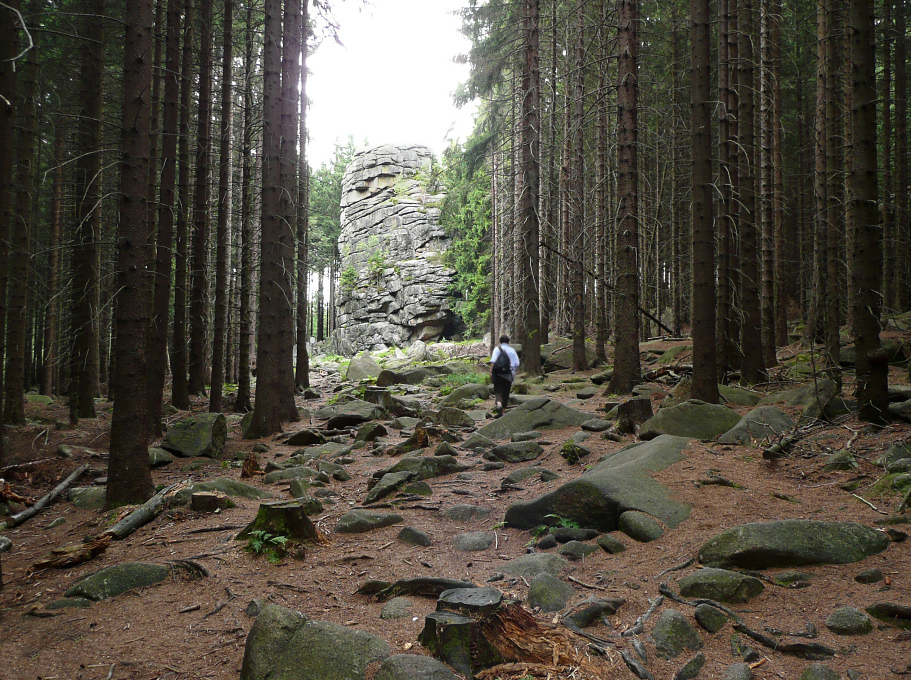
Forest clearing at the rocks

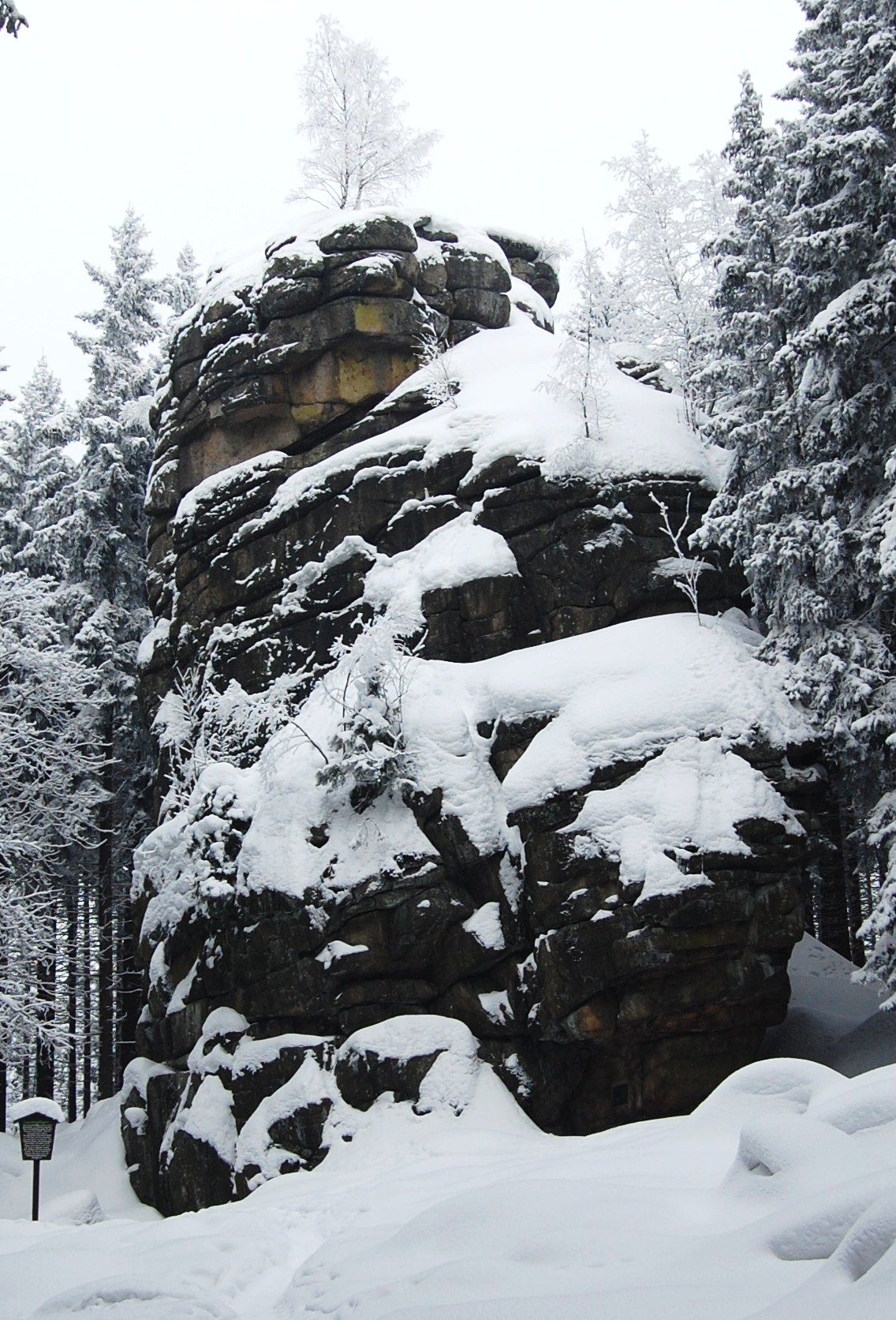
The rocks in winter

== See also ==
- Harzklippen

== Sources ==
- Gorsemann, Sabine and Kaiser, Christian (2010). Harz, DuMont Reiseverlag Ostfildern, ISBN 978-3-7701-7298-6, p. 151
