= Johann Christian Schuchardt =

German jurist and graphic artist (1799–1870)

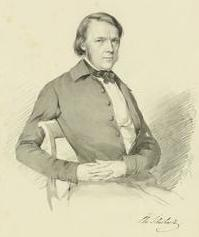
Johann Christian Schuchardt, Kunstschriftsteller (1799-1870)

Johann Christian Schuchardt (5 May 1799, Buttstädt - 10 August 1870, Weimar) was a German jurist, graphic artist, art historian and art critic. He served as Goethe's last private secretary.

== Life and work ==
He was the youngest son of Johann Abraham Schuchardt, a tailor. At the age of thirteen, he attended the Weimar Princely Free Drawing School. From 1820 to 1824, apparently seeking a more secure source of income, he studied law at the University of Jena. Upon graduating, he found a position as an Assessor with the government of the Grand Duchy of Sachsen-Weimar-Eisenach. There, he worked in a department devoted to science and art that was overseen by Goethe. In 1825, upon the recommendation of Johann Heinrich Meyer, Director of the drawing school, he was appointed Secretary and Supervisor of the Grand Duchy's graphic collections.

That same year, he became one of Goethe's private secretaries. The final version of Wilhelm Meisters Wanderjahre was dictated to him. Research trips took him to Dresden, Munich and Vienna.

When Goethe died, in 1832, Schuchardt became the manager of his art collection. In 1848 and 1849, he brought out the three volumes of Goethe’s Kunstsammlungen, which has come to be known as the "Schuchardt-Katalog", published by Friedrich Johannes Frommann in Jena. During the 1850s, he served as the Curator of the Grand Ducal art collections. From 1861 to 1868, he was the Director of the Drawing School.
