= Franz Horny =

German painter (1798–1824)

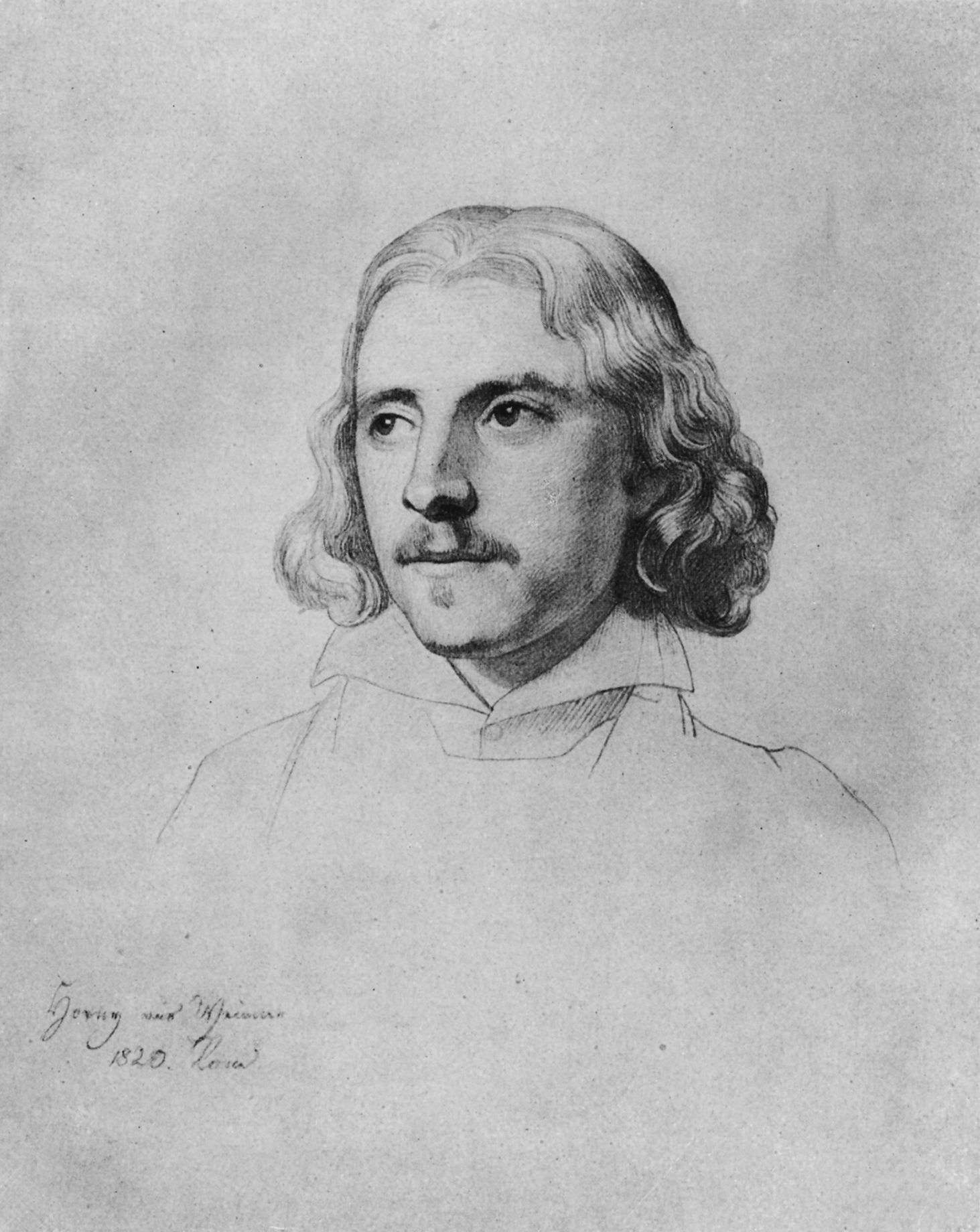
Franz Horny. Portrait by Carl Christian Vogel von Vogelstein (1820)

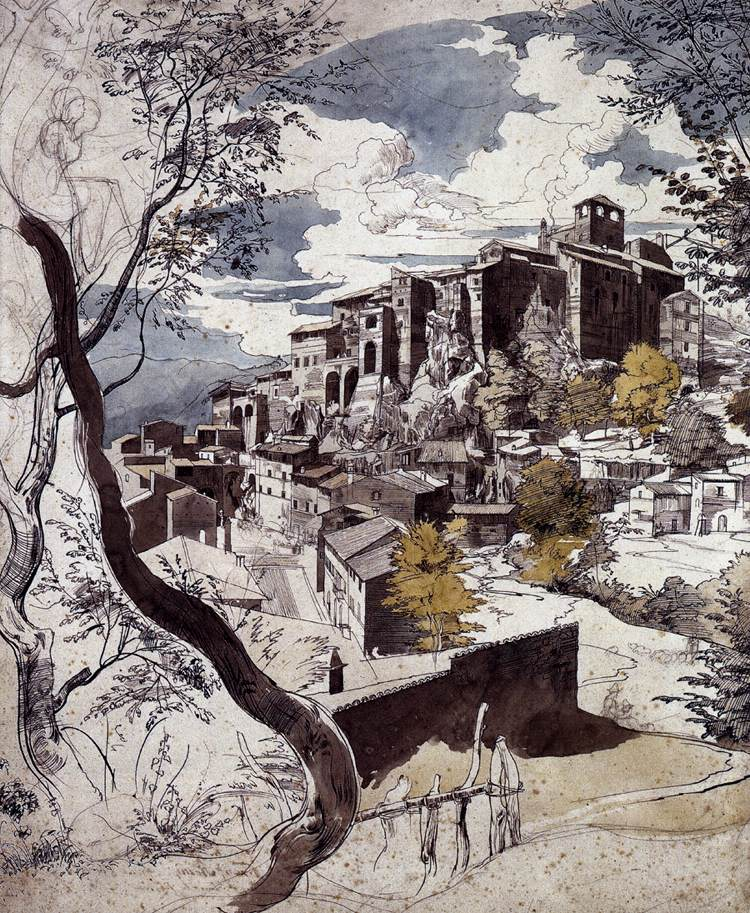
View of Olevano (1822)

Franz Theobald Horny (23 November 1798, Weimar – 23 June 1824, Olevano Romano) was a German painter in the Romantic style.

== Biography ==
He attended the Weimar Princely Free Drawing School, where he studied under Johann Heinrich Meyer, Goethe's advisor on artistic matters. His father, the engraver Konrad Horny, was also a teacher there. A decisive turn in his career came when he met the art historian, collector and patron Carl Friedrich von Rumohr, who took him along on a trip to Rome and helped to place him as a student in the workshop of Joseph Anton Koch.

He remained there until 1817, torn between his German-Romantic upbringing on one hand and the influences of the Nazarene movement on the other. He accompanied Rumohr on trips to Olevano and Frascati. On one of these trips, he met Peter von Cornelius who used his connections to obtain work for Horny, painting frescoes at the "Casino Massimo" (now known as the Villa Giustiniani Massimo), owned by the princely Massimo family.

Upon his return to Germany, he worked primarily as a landscape painter. Shortly thereafter, he was diagnosed with tuberculosis. As his illness worsened, he went back to Italy in hopes that the climate would be more amenable, and settled in Olevano in 1822. His disease worsened, however and, after much suffering, he died there. He was buried in the local cemetery.

In 1998/99, to celebrate Horny's 200th birthday, the Hamburger Kunsthalle, in cooperation with the Kunstsammlungen zu Weimar, presented "Ein Romantiker im Lichte Italiens", the first full exhibition devoted to Horny's work.
