= Konrad Horny =

German painter, graphic artist, and copper engraver (1764–1807)

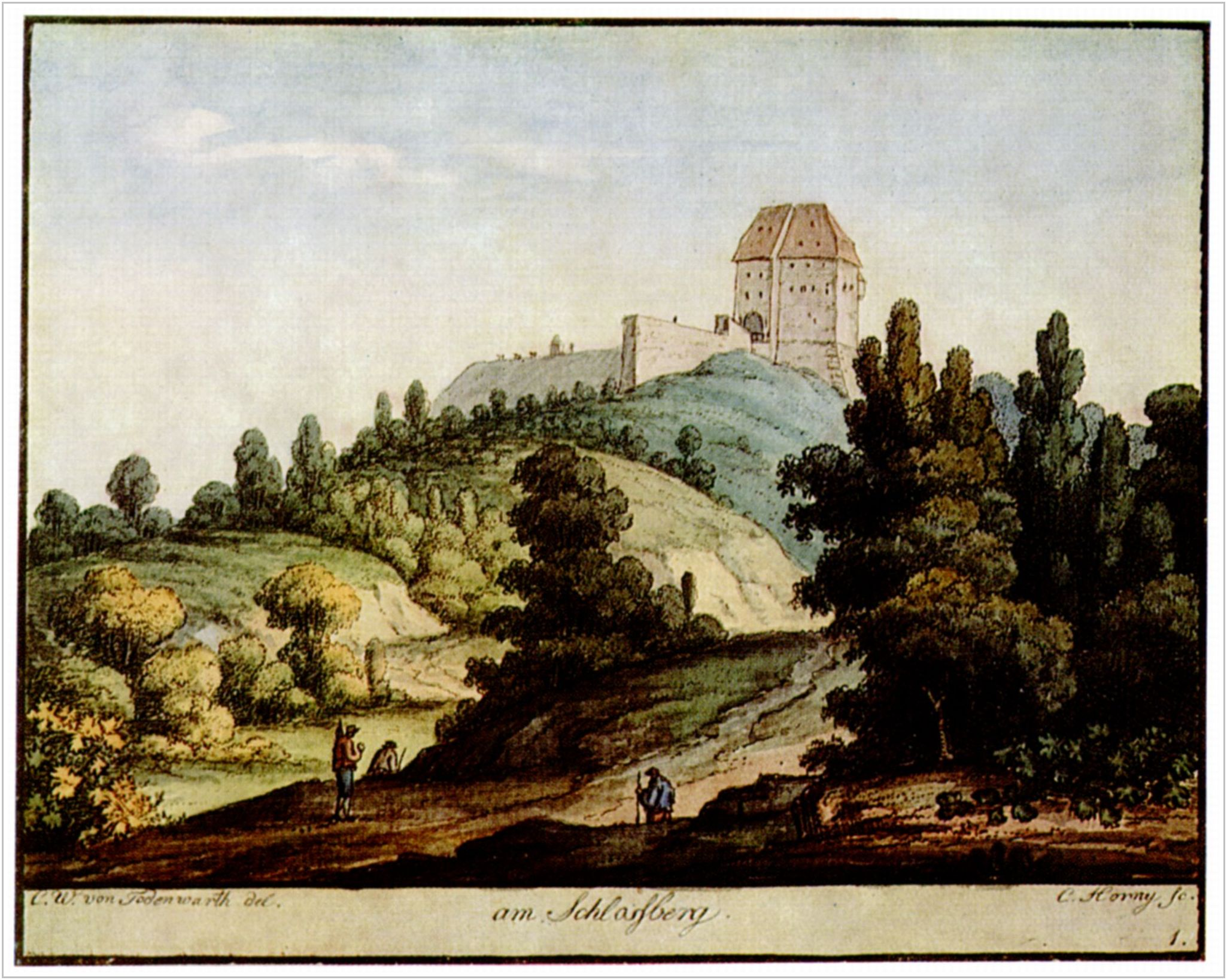
The Schlossberg (Castle Mountain), Eisenach

Johann Konrad Horny (November 1764, Mainz – 7 November 1807, Weimar) was a German painter, graphic artist, and copper engraver.

== Life and work ==
Until 1784, he was a landscape artist at the Höchst Porcelain Manufactory. After 1785, he lived in Weimar where, in 1789, he became a teacher at the Princely Free Drawing School. In 1793, he accompanied Goethe back to his hometown, then known as the Republic of Mainz, to witness a siege there, maintained by the French Army. From 1794 to 1795, he painted some rooms in Goethe's home. In 1798, his son Franz was born, and became one of his students while still a young boy.

He was also active as an art dealer. In 1801, when the government there made it easier to obtain concessions, he was awarded one to open his own art and book publishing business. He occasionally worked in collaboration with Georg Melchior Kraus.

Much of his work involves ancient Italian landscapes, in the Classical style, which were his specialty as a porcelain painter. At the Schillerhaus, one may see one of his etchings, depicting the city of Lipari.
