= Friedrich Martersteig =

German painter

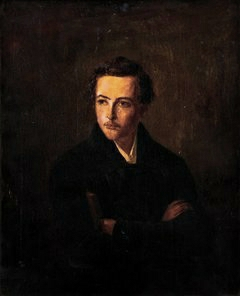
Self-portrait (1838)

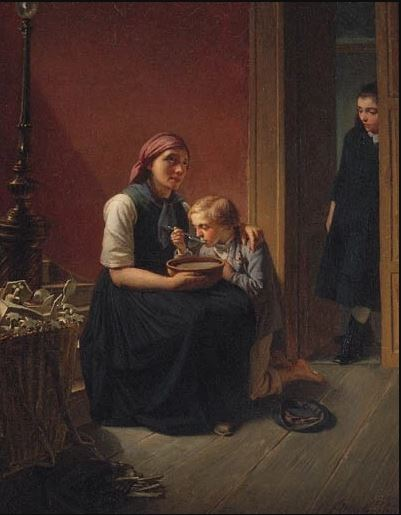
Hot Soup

Friedrich Wilhelm Heinrich Martersteig (11 March 1814, Weimar - 6 September 1899, Weimar) was a German history and genre painter. After 1874, he spelled his name Mardersteig.

== Life and work ==
He began his studies in 1822 at the Weimar Princely Free Drawing School. In 1829, a grant from Grand Duke Charles Frederick enabled him to attend the Dresden Academy of Fine Arts, where he studied with Ludwig Richter and made copies of the Old Masters.

Upon graduating in 1834, thanks to another grant, he was able to continue at the Kunstakademie Düsseldorf, where he studied with Karl Ferdinand Sohn, Theodor Hildebrandt and Friedrich Wilhelm von Schadow.

From 1838 to 1848, he lived in Paris; working at the studios of Paul Delaroche and Ary Scheffer. This was followed by exhibitions at the Salon and the Prussian Academy of Arts (1844–1850).

In 1848, he returned to Weimar and received a commission from Grand Duke Charles Frederick to create a decorative painting for Wartburg Castle. The following year, he was elected a member of the Prussian Academy. Shortly after, the Grand Duke named him a Professor.

From 1853 to 1884, he was a drawing teacher at the "Sophienstift"; a girls' school established by Princess Sophie of the Netherlands. In 1862, he was appointed President of the Allgemeine Deutsche Kunstgenossenschaft (General German Art Cooperative).
