= Ludwig von Schorn =

German art historian

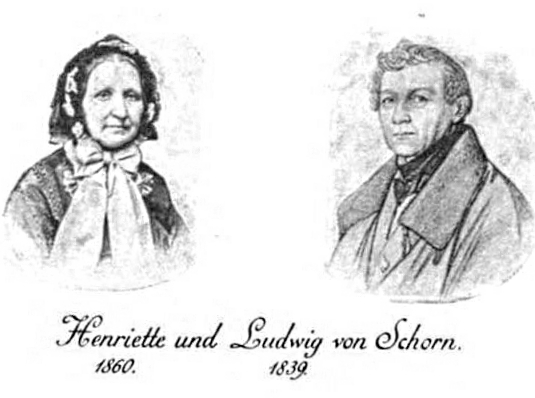
The Von Schorns; from Zwei menschenalter : Erinnerungen und Briefe by Adelheid von Schorn (1901)

Johann Karl Ludwig Schorn, after 1838 von Schorn (10 June 1793, Castell - 17 February 1842, Weimar) was a German art historian and university Professor. His second wife was the poet, Henriette von Schorn.

== Biography ==
From 1811 to 1814, he studied evangelical theology at the University of Erlangen. After graduating, he moved to Munich, where he came under the influence of the intellectual circle associated with Friedrich Thiersch; developing an interest in art history and archaeology.

In 1818, he published his first work, Über die Studien der griechischen Künstler (On the studies of Greek artists), which attracted the attention of the art collector and historian, Sulpiz Boisserée. The following year, Boisserée recommended him to the publisher, Johann Friedrich Cotta, who entrusted him with editing the Kunstblatt (Art sheet), a supplement to the Morgenblatt für gebildete Stände of Stuttgart. It soon became Germany's leading art journal. Schorn was able to attract numerous well known contributors, including Carl Friedrich von Rumohr, Karl Otfried Müller, Johann David Passavant, Johann Gottlob von Quandt, Franz Theodor Kugler, Gustav Friedrich Waagen und Karl Schnaase.

In 1826, he married Johanna Voigt, daughter of the mathematician, Johann Heinrich Voigt. That same year, he was given a professorship at the Academy of Fine Arts Munich, and the chairs of mythology and art history at the Ludwig-Maximilians-Universität München. In 1830, he was named an extraordinary member of the Bavarian Academy of Sciences. In 1833, Johanna and his mother both died. That, as well as continuing opposition from the painter, Peter von Cornelius (and his followers in the Nazarene movement), led him to accept an offer from Charles Frederick, Grand Duke of Saxe-Weimar-Eisenach, to become the new Director of the Weimar Princely Free Drawing School.

He was awarded the Order of the Crown in 1838, which gave him the right to use the noble prefix "von". In 1839, he became a Privy Councillor and was named a Knight in the Order of the White Falcon. That same year, he married Henriette Wilhelmine Auguste Freiin von Stein, one of the courtiers of the Grand Duchess Maria. Their daughter, the writer Adelheid von Schorn, was born in 1841.

He died the following year, from complications related to gout.

== Sources ==
- Enrica Yvonne Dilk (2007). "Schorn, Johann Karl Ludwig von". Neue Deutsche Biographie (in German). Vol. 23. Berlin: Duncker & Humblot. pp. 434–544. (full text online).
- Hyacinth Holland (1891). "Schorn, Ludwig von" . Allgemeine Deutsche Biographie (in German). Vol. 32. Leipzig: Duncker & Humblot. pp. 379–382.
