= Karl Hagemeister =

German painter

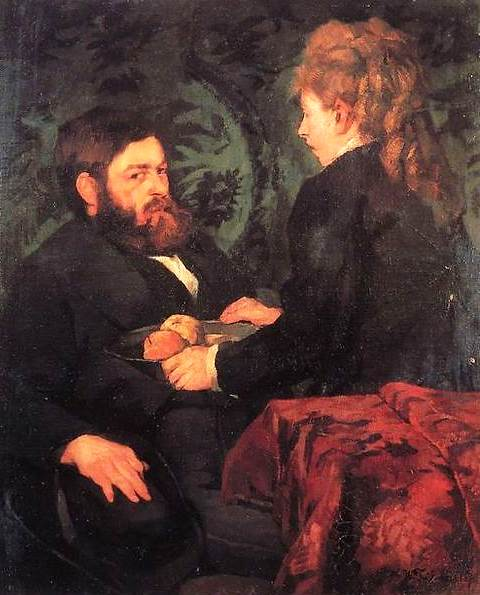
- Karl Hagemeister with a model "Adam and Eve in Costume" by Wilhelm Trübner (1873)
- Born: 12 March 1848; Werder, Kingdom of Prussia
- Died: 5 August 1933 (aged 85); Werder
- Education: Weimar Princely Free Drawing School

Karl Hagemeister (12 March 1848 – 5 August 1933) was a German landscape painter.

== Life ==
He was the son of a fruit grower and developed an early interest in nature from the forested, watery surroundings of his birthplace in Werder. He trained as a teacher in Köpenick, then went to teach elementary school in Berlin, where he caught the attention of landscape painter Ferdinand Bellermann, who saw him at work in Schönhausen Palace park.

Bellermann convinced Hagemeister to give up his plans to become a drawing teacher and be an artist instead, helping him to obtain a position in the studios of Friedrich Preller. From 1871 to 1873, he received classically oriented training at Preller's Weimar Princely Free Drawing School, where he was introduced to Philipp Otto Runge's Farbenkugel and Goethe's Theory of Colours, both of which would heavily influence his thinking on the subject.

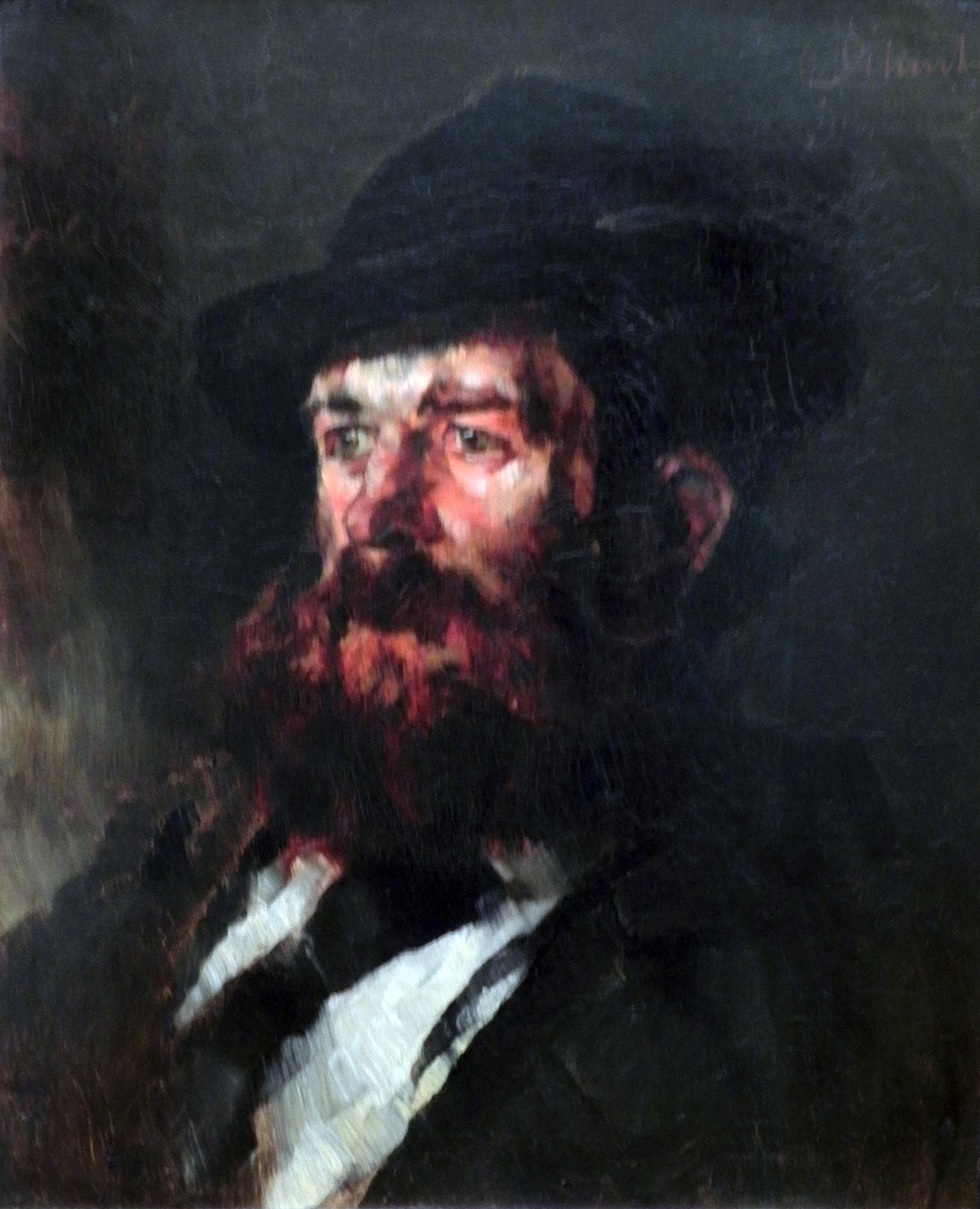
Portrait of Hagemeister by Carl Schuch (1876)

Beginning in 1873, he embarked on a long series of study trips, during which he became friends with Carl Schuch and, later, with Wilhelm Trübner. The three spent a year studying the Old Masters in the Netherlands, then Hagemeister went on to Italy, where he remained until 1876, when he returned to Werder. Later, he would travel throughout Germany seeking subject matter and gradually began to include figures in his landscapes, employing maids and farmers as models.

In 1884, Schuch persuaded Hagemeister to accompany him on a trip to Paris, where they both received their first exposure to the Barbizon School. Their friendship ended during this trip, apparently because Schuch was jealous of the faster stylistic progress that Hagemeister was making.

=== Later career ===
Back in Werder, Hagemeister increasingly gave up his oil paints and began to work with oil pastel chunks. Although he never formally became an art teacher at any academy, he never rejected anyone who sought out his artistic advice. He later became one of the founding members of the Berlin Secession. In 1912, he gave private art lessons to seventeen-year-old Prince Friedrich Leopold, at the Prince's request. He exhibited extensively and, in 1913, was awarded the Bavarian "Order of Merit for Sciences and Arts". The following year, he was named a "Royal Prussian Professor" (a largely ceremonial title that did not involve any teaching). Two years later, he became ill, possibly from lead poisoning from the paints he used, and gave up painting. Most of what he had earned disappeared in the hyper-inflation following World War I. In 1923, he was named a member of the Academy of Arts. He never fully recovered from his illness and died while living with his brother at the family farmhouse.

== Selected paintings ==
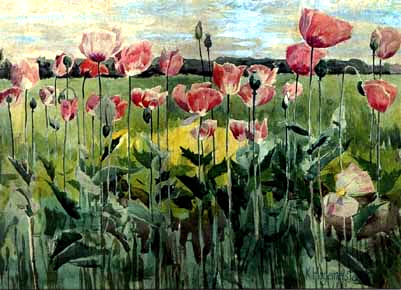
Poppy Field (1875)

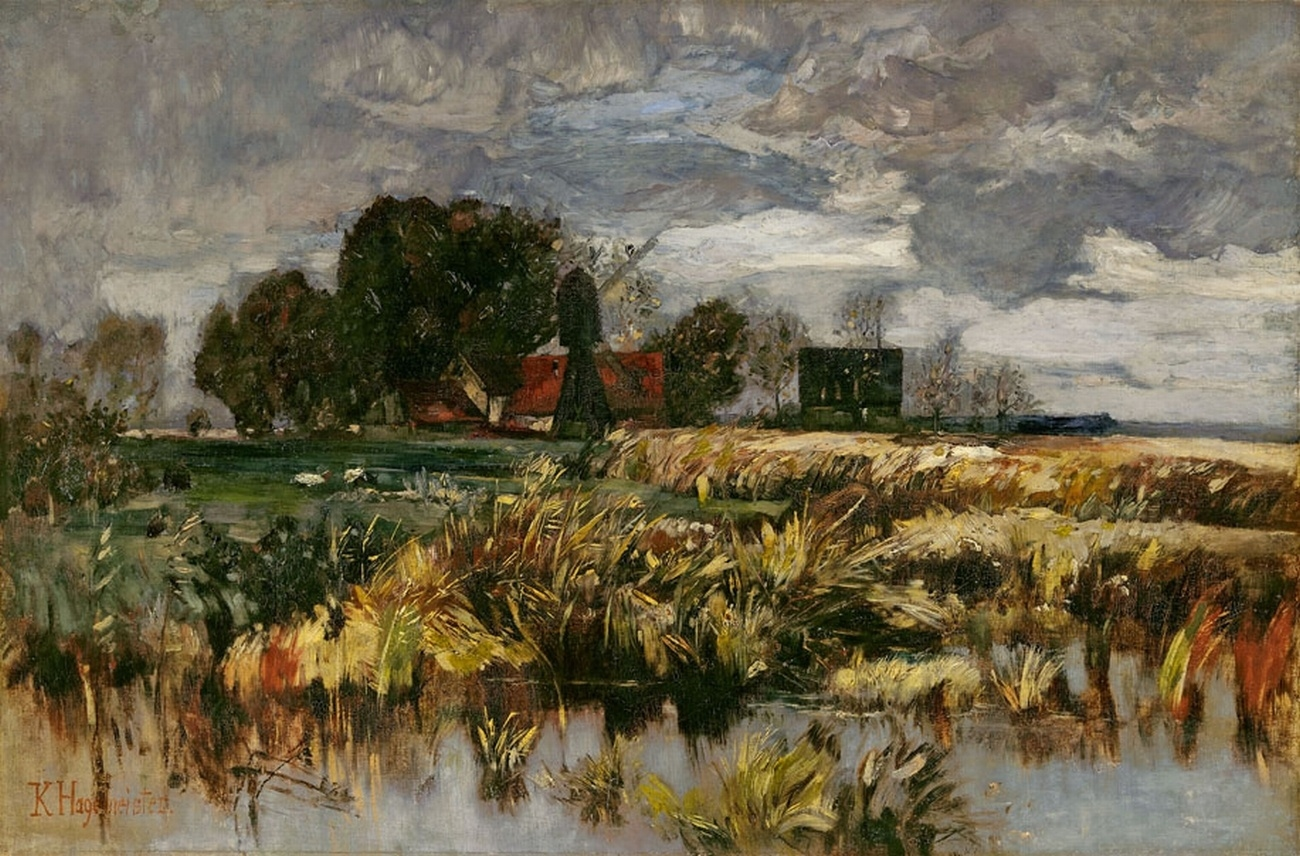
Landscape with Windmill (c.1880)

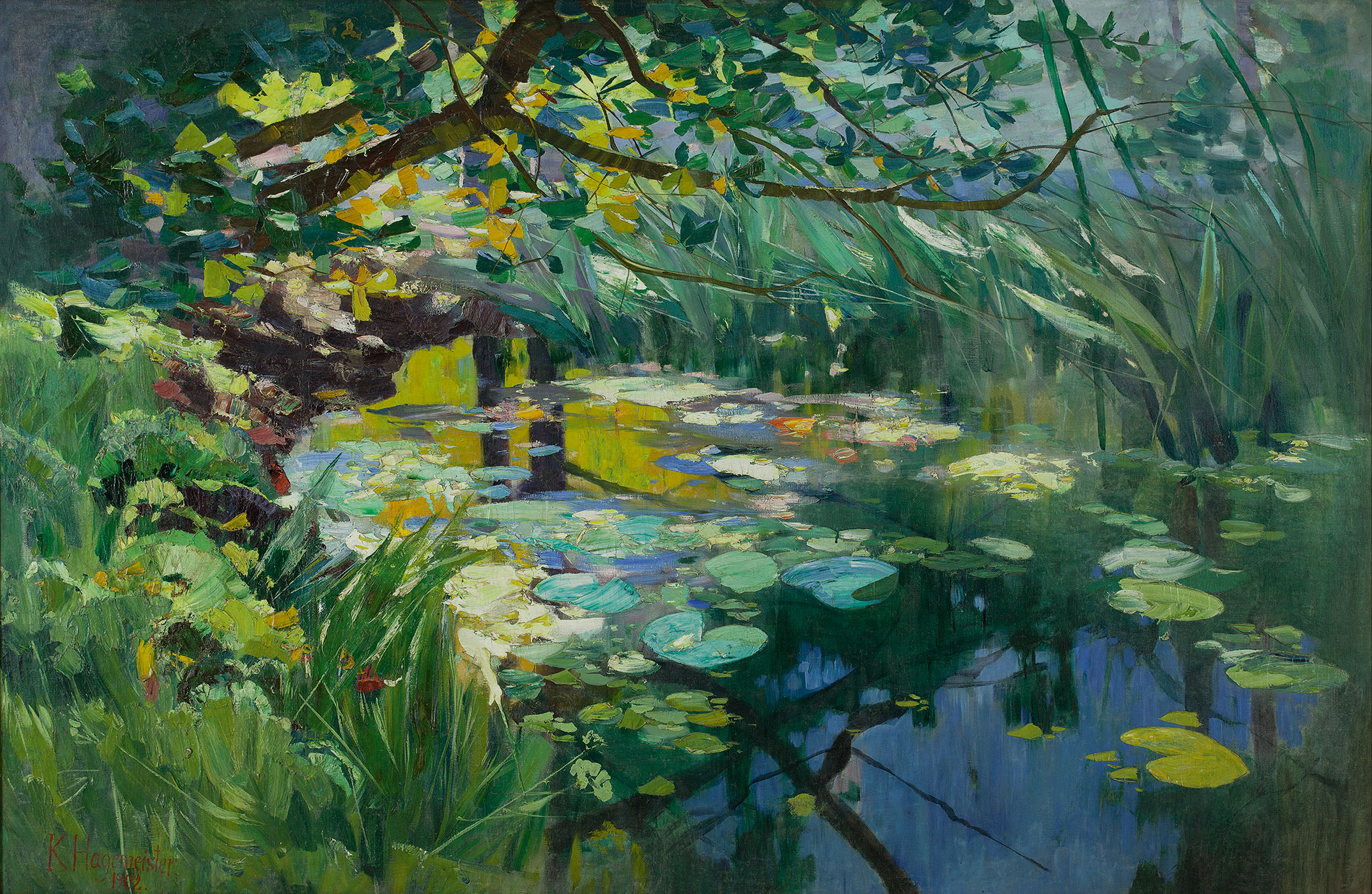
Pond in the Borderland (1902)

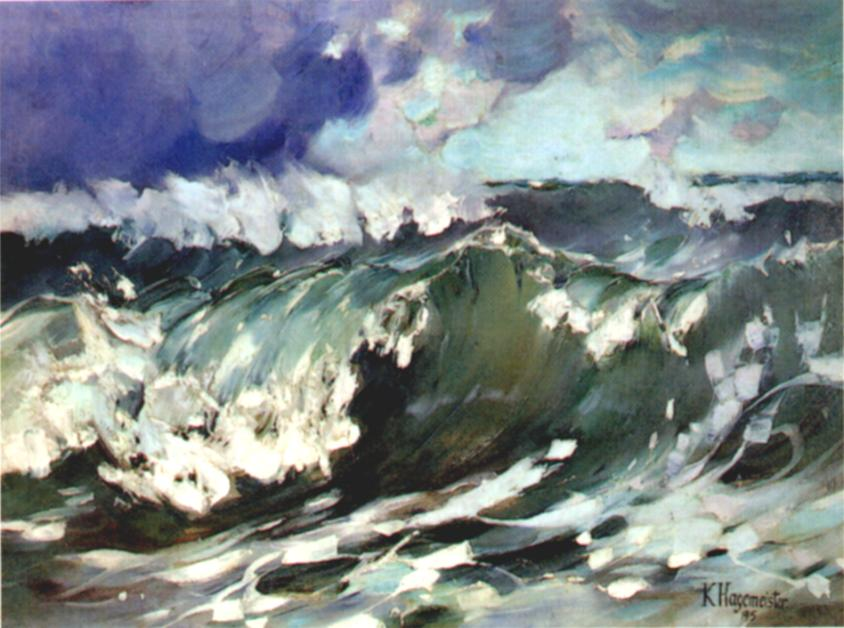
Waves in a Storm (1915)

== Writings ==
- Carl Schuch. Sein Leben und seine Werke (Carl Schuch, His Life and His Work), Cassirer, Berlin 1913
- Kleine Selbstbiographie (Short Autobiography), Werder, 1928
