= Johann Julius Heinsius =

German oil painter and miniaturist

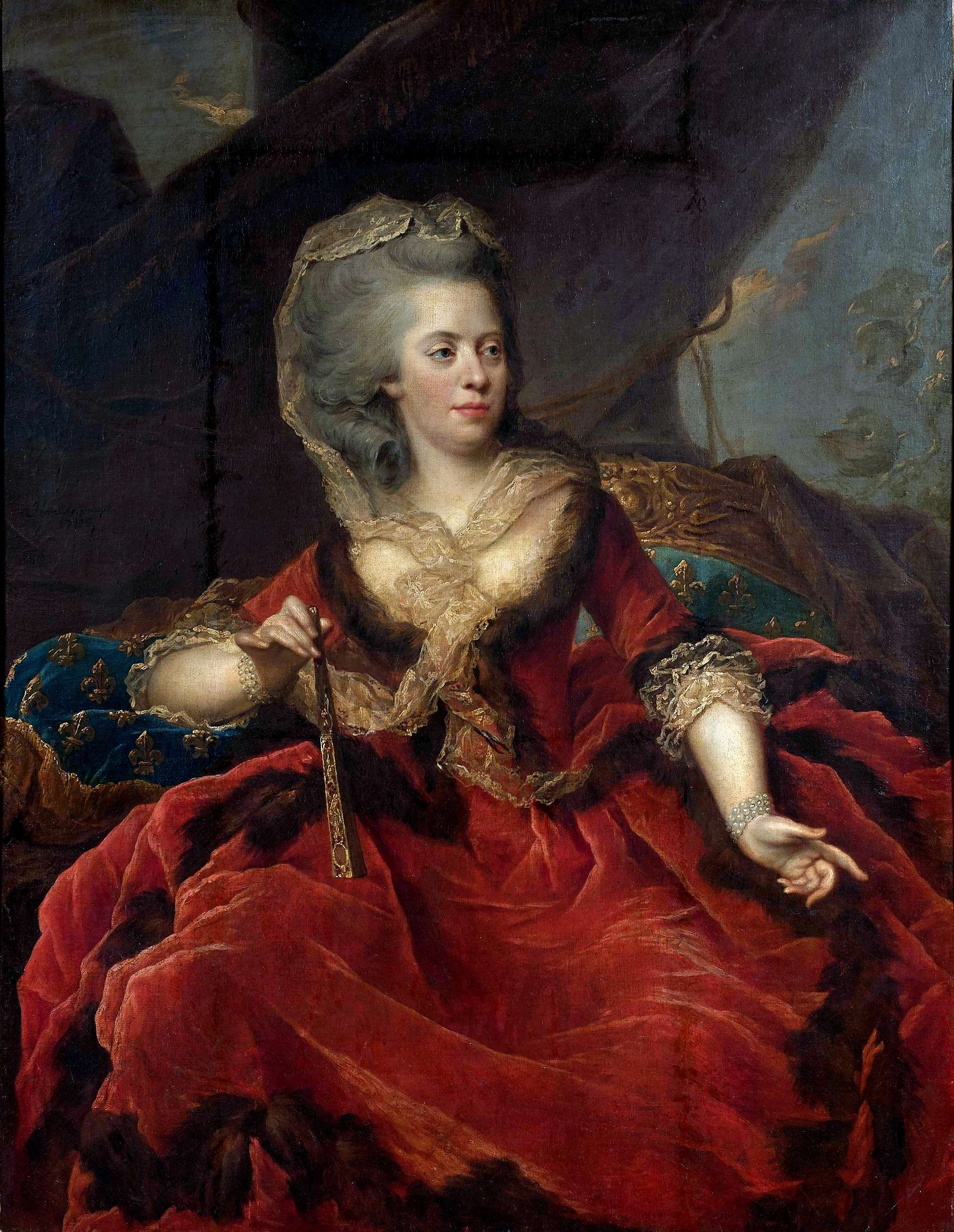
Portrait of Adélaïde of France

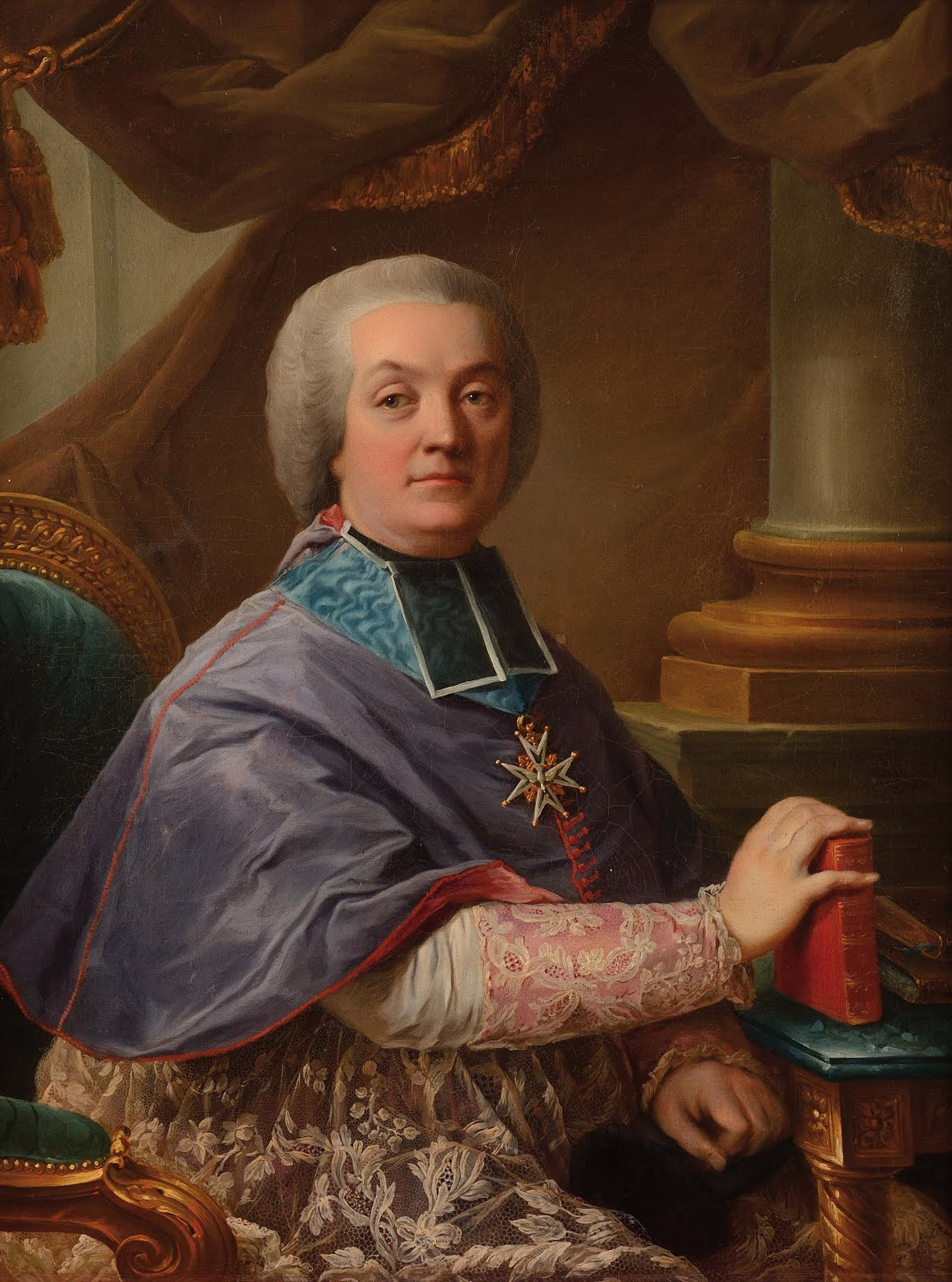
Portrait of Jean-Armand de Roquelaure

Johann Julius Heinsius (7 February 1740, Hildburghausen - 19 May 1812, Orléans) was a German oil painter and miniaturist.

== Biography ==
He was the brother of Johann Ernst Heinsius, a painter from Ilmenau. They were the sons of the painter Johann Christian Heintz (1706-1752). Heinsius travelled with his father to the Netherlands around 1752 and there he became an active painter. From 1771 he went to France and exhibited canvases at salons. Soon afterwards, he returned to Germany and in 1772 he became an official painter in Weimar.

Later on, he became painter of Louis XV's daughters. In 1779 and 1782 he exhibited at the "Salon de la Correspondance" in Paris. Among the works he exhibited at 1782 exhibition were portraits of the d'Espagnac family. Due to his connections to the Royal family (he had been named the “Peintre des Mesdames de France”, artist to the sisters of Louis XV) he was forced to leave France for some time during the French Revolution.

In 1788 he exhibited in Berlin under the title "Hoffmahler zu Weimar". Despite his connections to the French Royalties and his foreign birth, he was eventually allowed to return to France to pick up his main practice as a portraitist. In 1790 he moved to the city of Orléans about 130 kilometres south west of Paris, where he remained until this death. Regular trips to Paris, however, kept him well informed of artistic trends there. Heinsius produced a great number of oil paintings, as well as miniatures and drawings in black chalk.

== Selected exhibitions ==
- Paris, Louvre Museum, "Portrait de femme"
- Paris, Louvre Museum, "Portrait d'homme"
- Paris, Louvre Museum, "Antoine Huard à l'âge de 30 ans"
- Versailles, Châteaux de Versailles et de Trianon, "Jeanne Philippon, Madame Roland"
- Versailles, châteaux de Versailles et de Trianon, "Madame Victoire", fille de Louis XV
