= Carl Schuch =

Austrian painter (1846–1903)

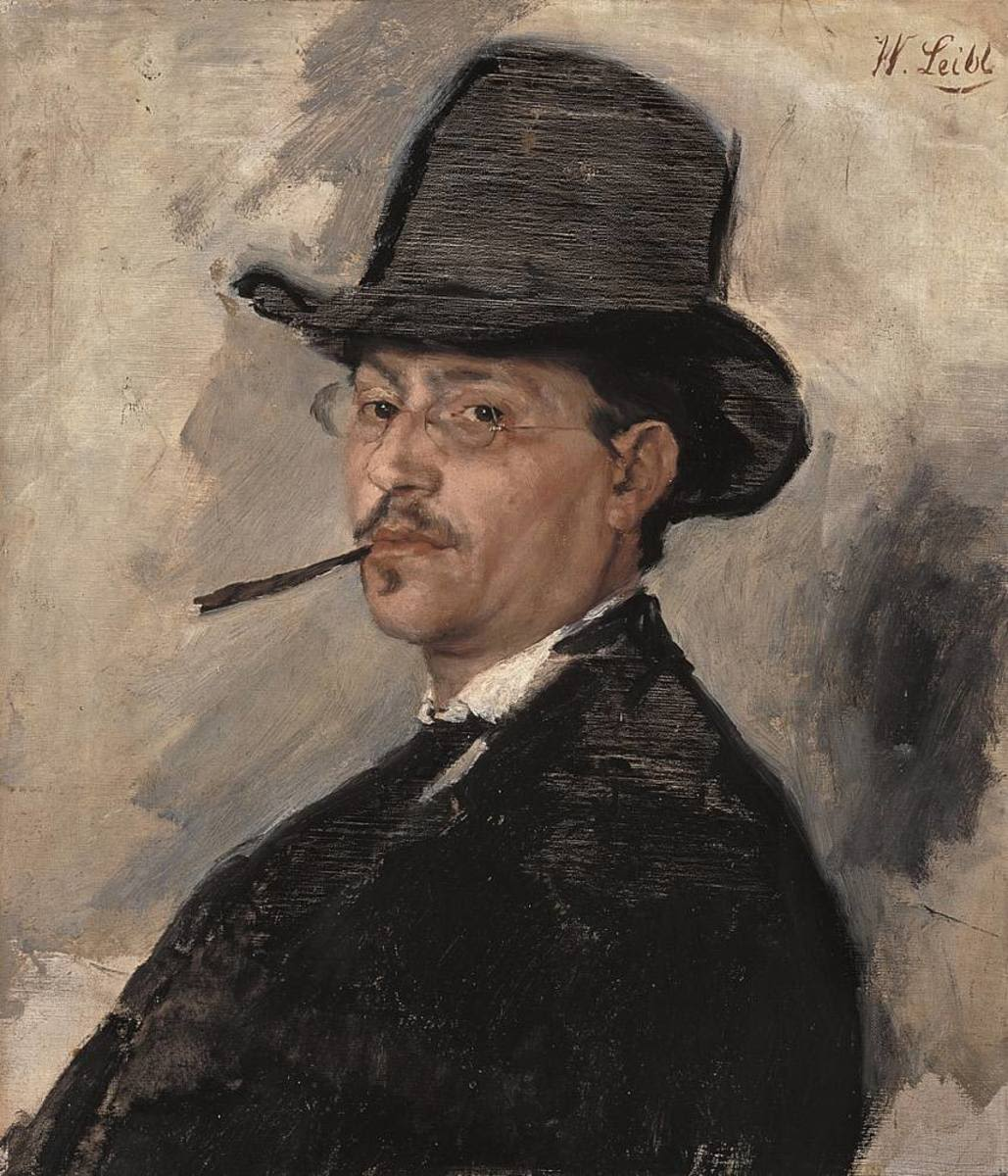
Wilhelm Leibl, The Painter Carl Schuch (1876; German: Der Maler Carl Schuch), Neue Pinakothek, Munich

Carl Eduard Schuch (30 September 1846 – 13 September 1903) was an Austrian painter, born in Vienna, who spent most of his lifetime outside Austria, in Germany, Italy and France. He painted primarily still lifes and landscapes.

From 1865 to 1867, he studied landscape painting under the academician Ludwig Halauska. Among his early works are studies of heads which he said he wished to paint "like still-lifes, tone by tone, without emotion". During the period 1882–94 he was based in Paris, where he was greatly impressed by the work of Claude Monet—whom he described as "the Rembrandt of plein-air painting"—although he was attracted most of all to Rembrandt and the artists of the Barbizon school. In 1884 and 1885 he spent the summer months in the Netherlands, studying the Dutch old masters as well as the contemporary painters of the Hague School, and filling notebooks with detailed descriptions of the colors he observed in paintings that he admired. Of all the artists belonging to the circle around Wilhelm Leibl (called the Leibl-Kreis), Schuch was the most devoted to color. His work marks the transition from the realist tradition to the modern movement in Vienna.

Schuch's most famous, and longest friendship was with the artist Karl Hagemeister. The two met in Bavaria, traveled all over central Europe together, and settled for 3 years in Ferch, a small village south of Berlin. The two shared a very small house, sharing a single bedroom and painting the nature around Ferch. The robust Hagemeister tended to the sensitive Schuch by cooking, hunting, and fishing for the pair. It has been speculated that the two were lovers. Their friendship ended when Schuch moved to Paris. The last occasion of their meeting was when Schuch was visited by Hagemeister. This led to a disagreement about the merit of Hagemeister's then completed "Teller mit Austern" (1884), prompting Hagemeister to promptly dispose of 6 of his own works in the Seine, and a cessation of their relationship. Upon the death of Schuch, Max Liebermann prompted Hagemeister to write Schuch's biography.

Schuch was financially independent and made little effort to exhibit his work; in his lifetime he sold only one painting. His later years were marked by a degenerative illness, and he stopped painting in 1891. He died in Vienna.

== Gallery ==
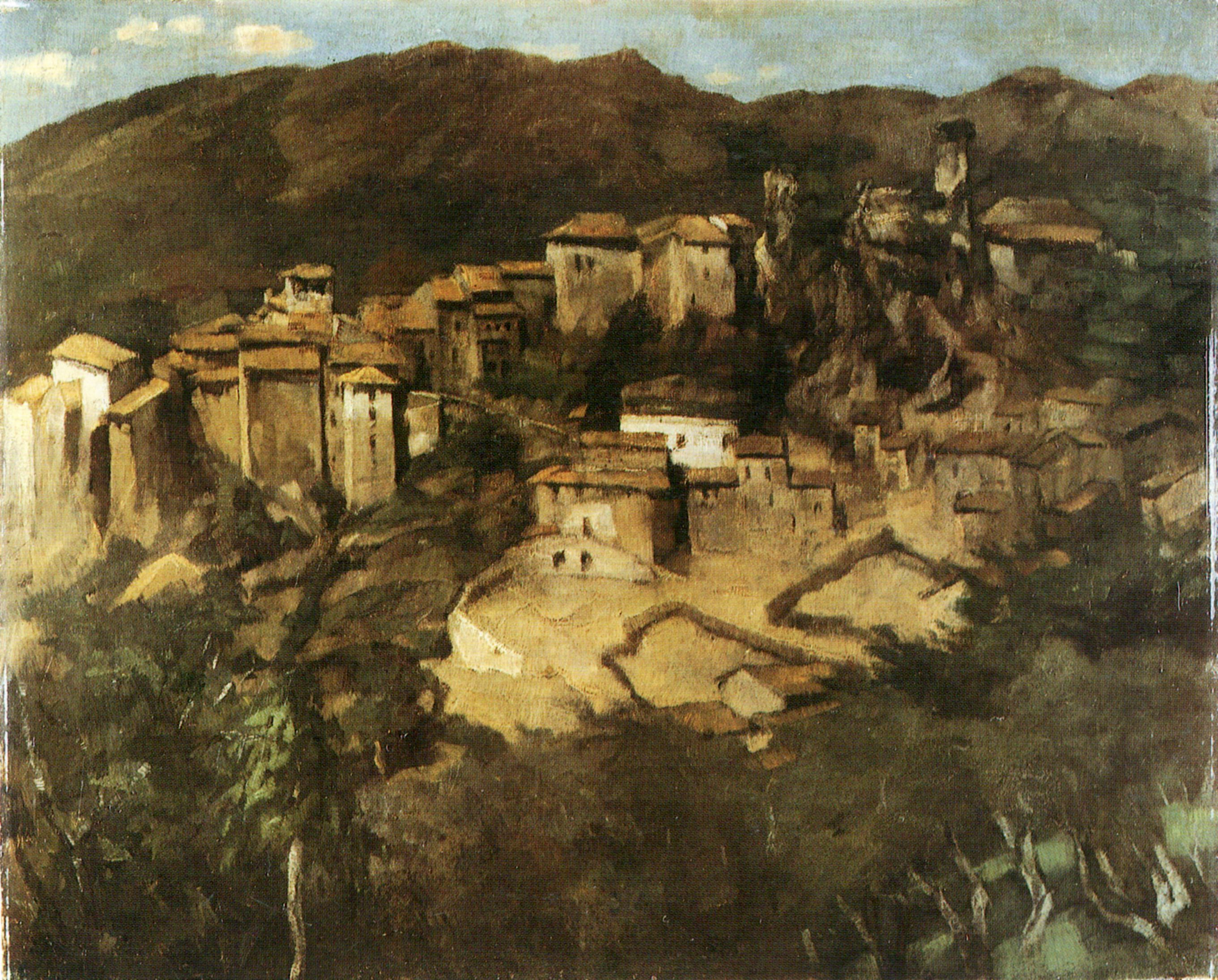
View of Olevano, c.1875, Lower Saxony State Museum

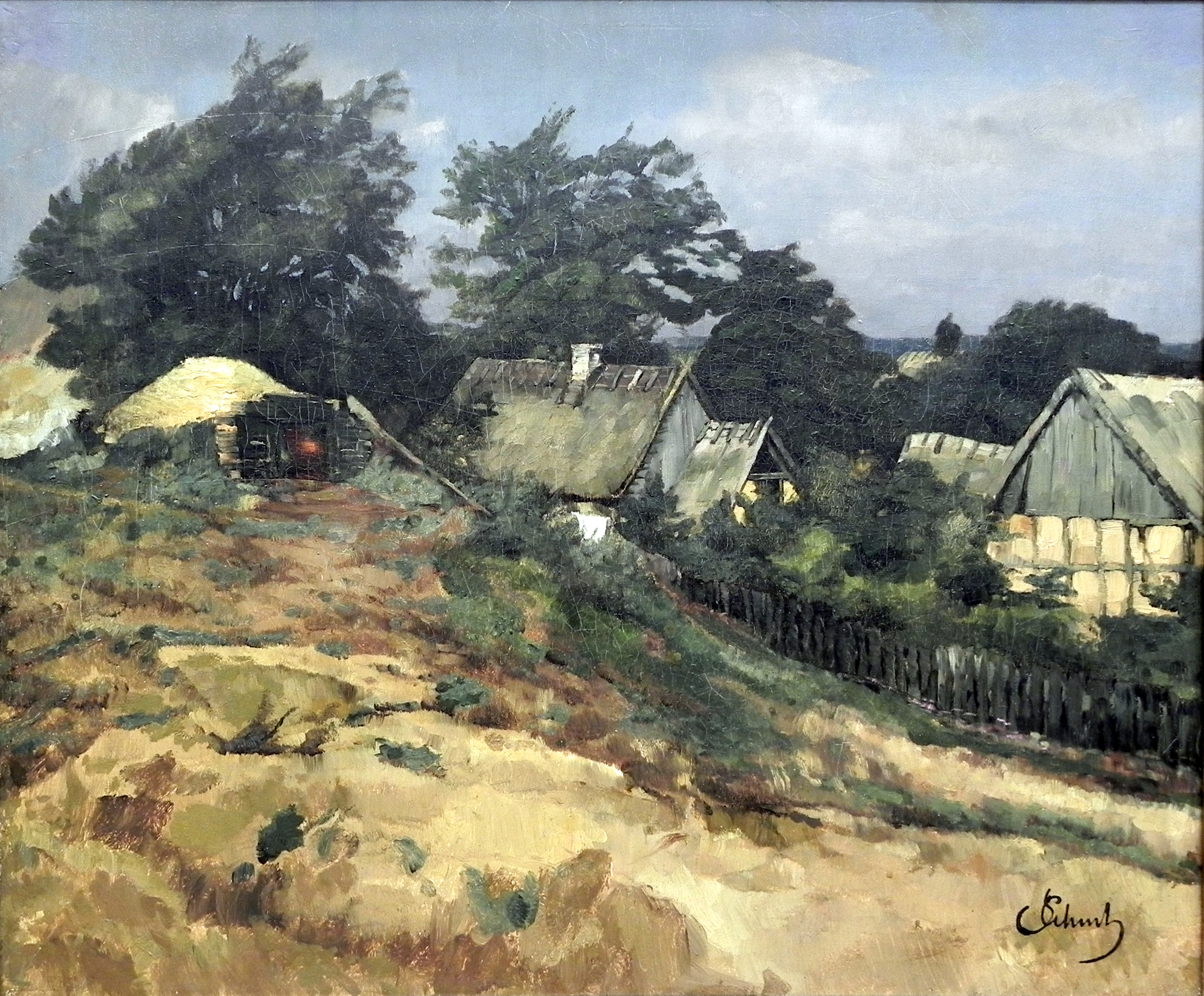
Houses in the wetlands by Lake Schwielow, between 1878 and 1881, Alte Nationalgalerie

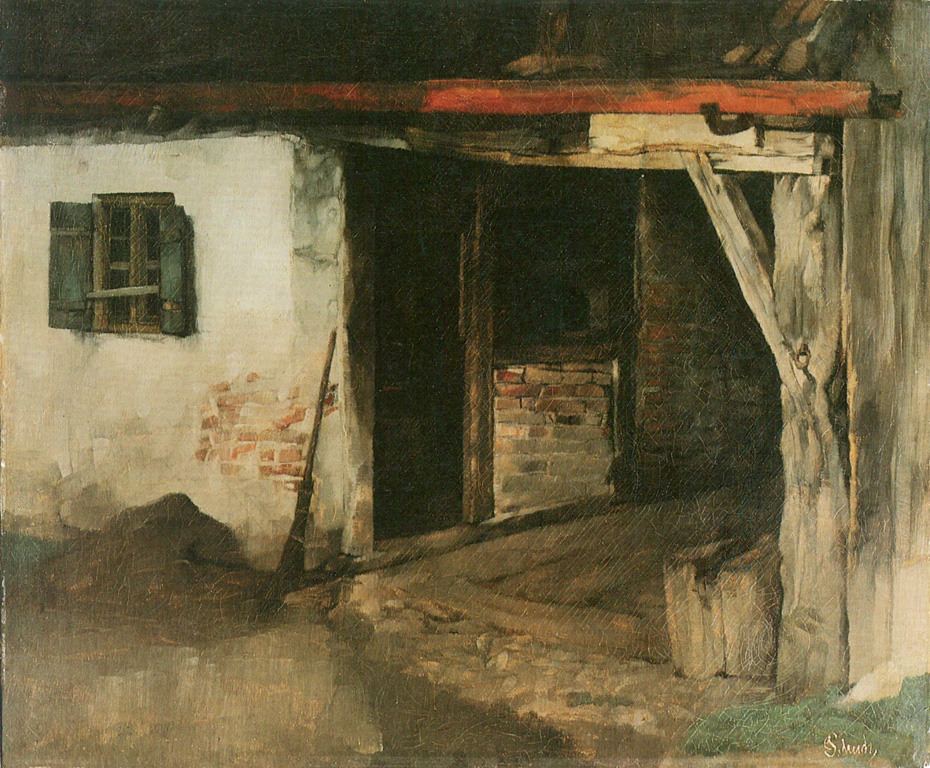
Forge in Weßling, 1876, Morat-Institut, Freiburg

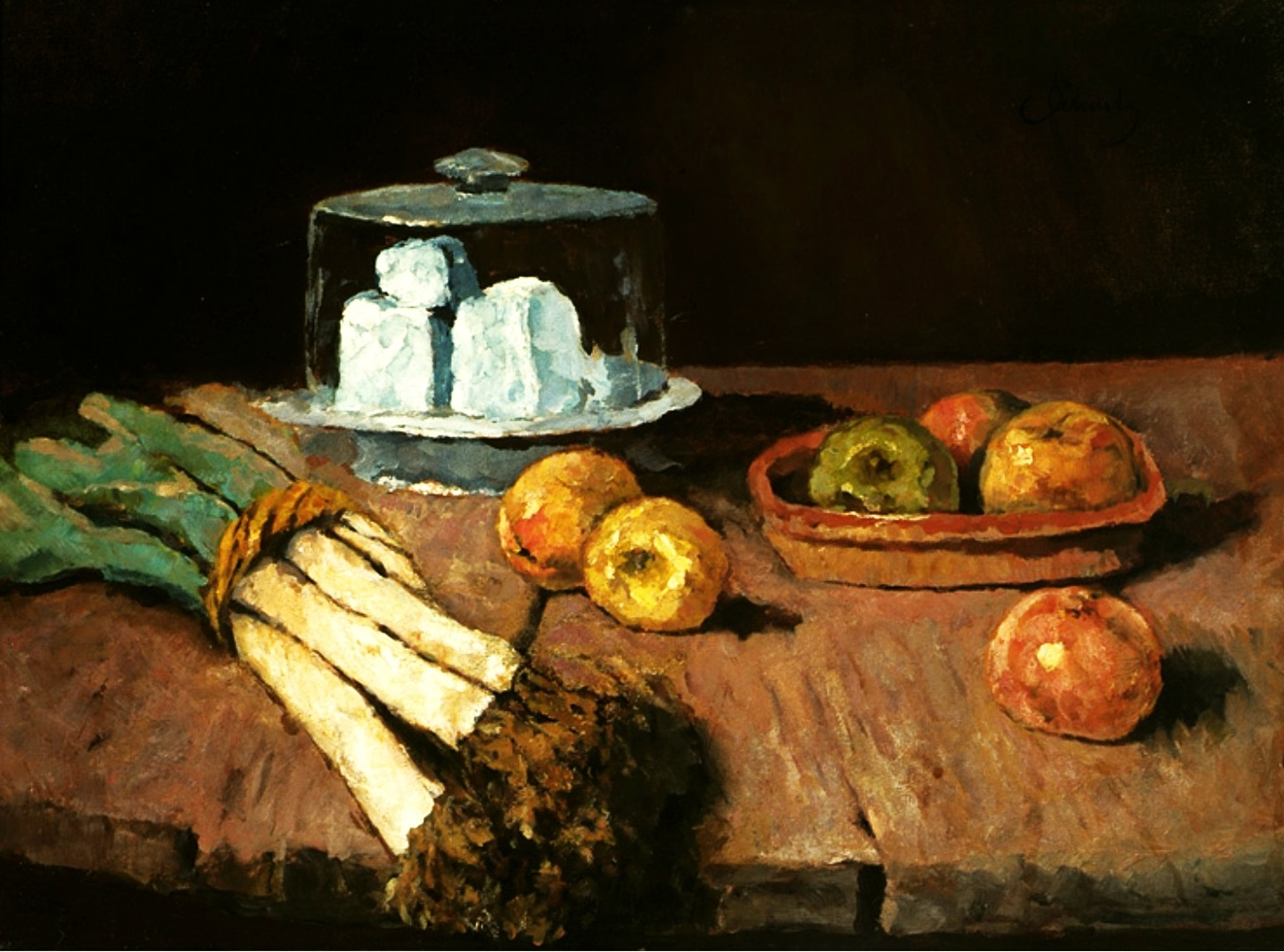
Still Life with leeks, cheese and apples, before 1888, National Museum, Warsaw

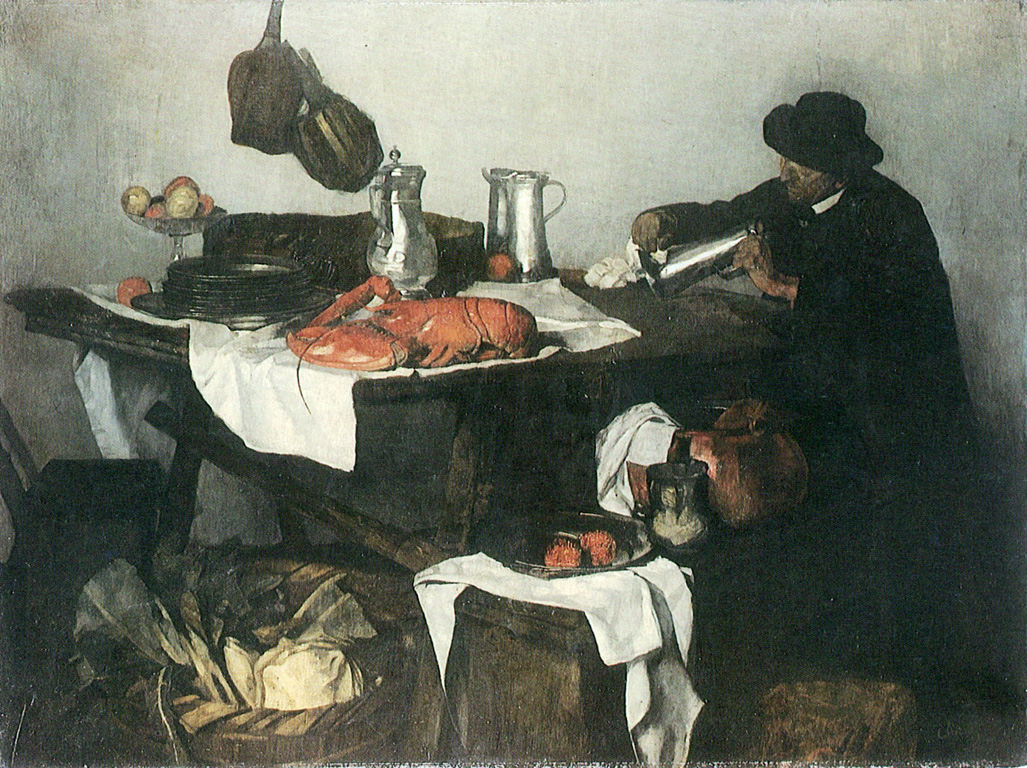
Matthew (?) still-life, 1879/80, National Museum in Wrocław
