= Propyläen =

Magazine published by Johann Wolfgang von Goethe

Die Propyläen was a periodical begun in July 1798 by Johann Wolfgang von Goethe and his friend Johann Heinrich Meyer.

== Impetus ==
During the journal's short, three-year existence its various contributors and editors, for example, shown in essays by Wilhelm von Humboldt and Friedrich von Schiller, sought to address, disseminate, and foment ideas and fundamental conceptions concerning art and aesthetic processes and therewith to determine, on cultural and social levels of influence, what characterizes art's essential import and its practice by artists. Alike to Friedrich Schiller's Die Horen, the journal's basic impetus was to extend the reach of classical values in art.

Through its German name, "Propyläen" (from the Greek προπύλαιον, propylaion, pl. προπύλαια, propulaia, an entryway to a building), which can be translated to English as "Propylaea", the periodical, including its various themes, was to represent a uniquely cultural "entryway"; and thus, it symbolized the building that is life into which the artist is required to enter.
