= Johannistor (Jena) =

Coordinates: 50.9294°N 11.5841°E

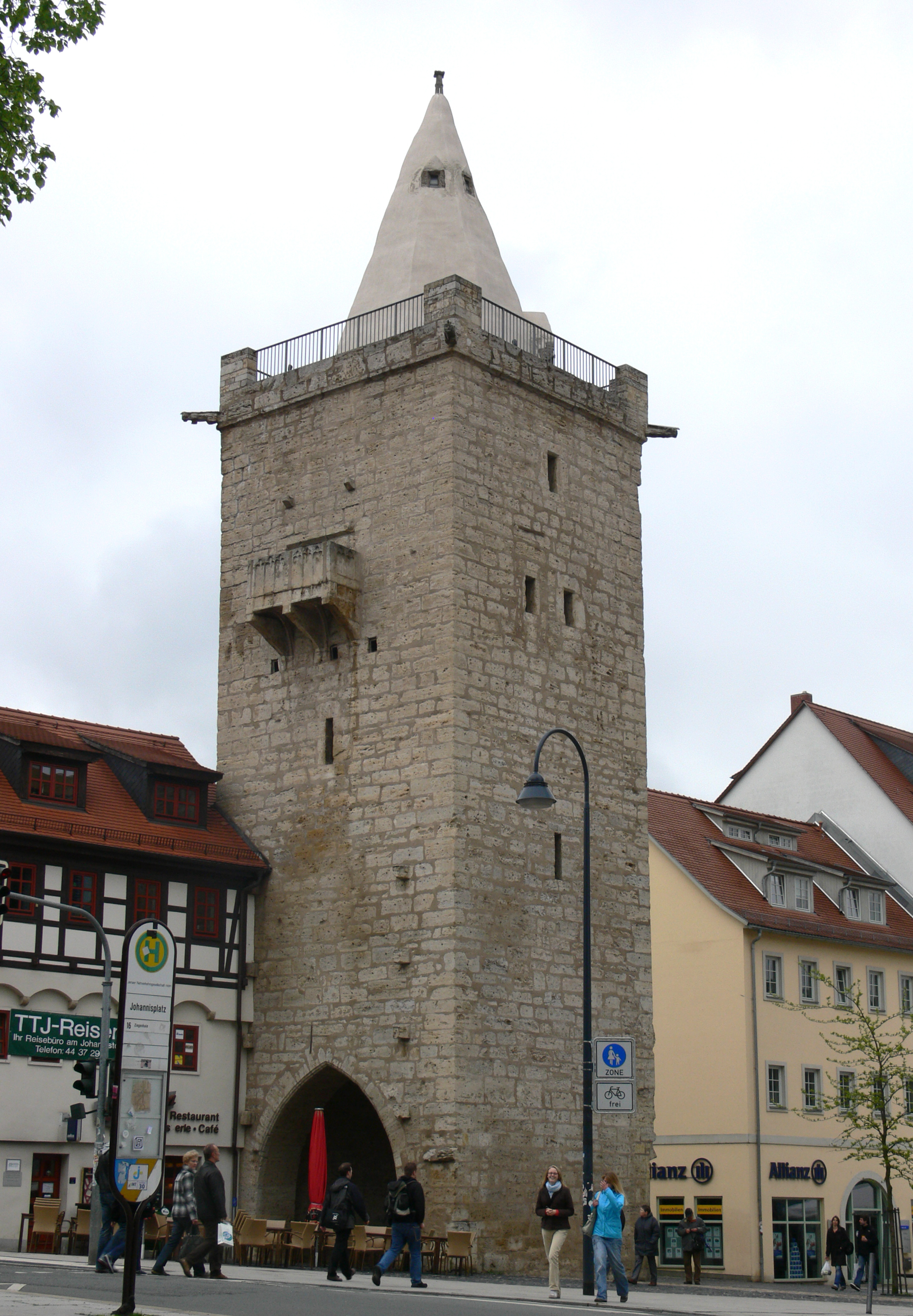
The Johannistor

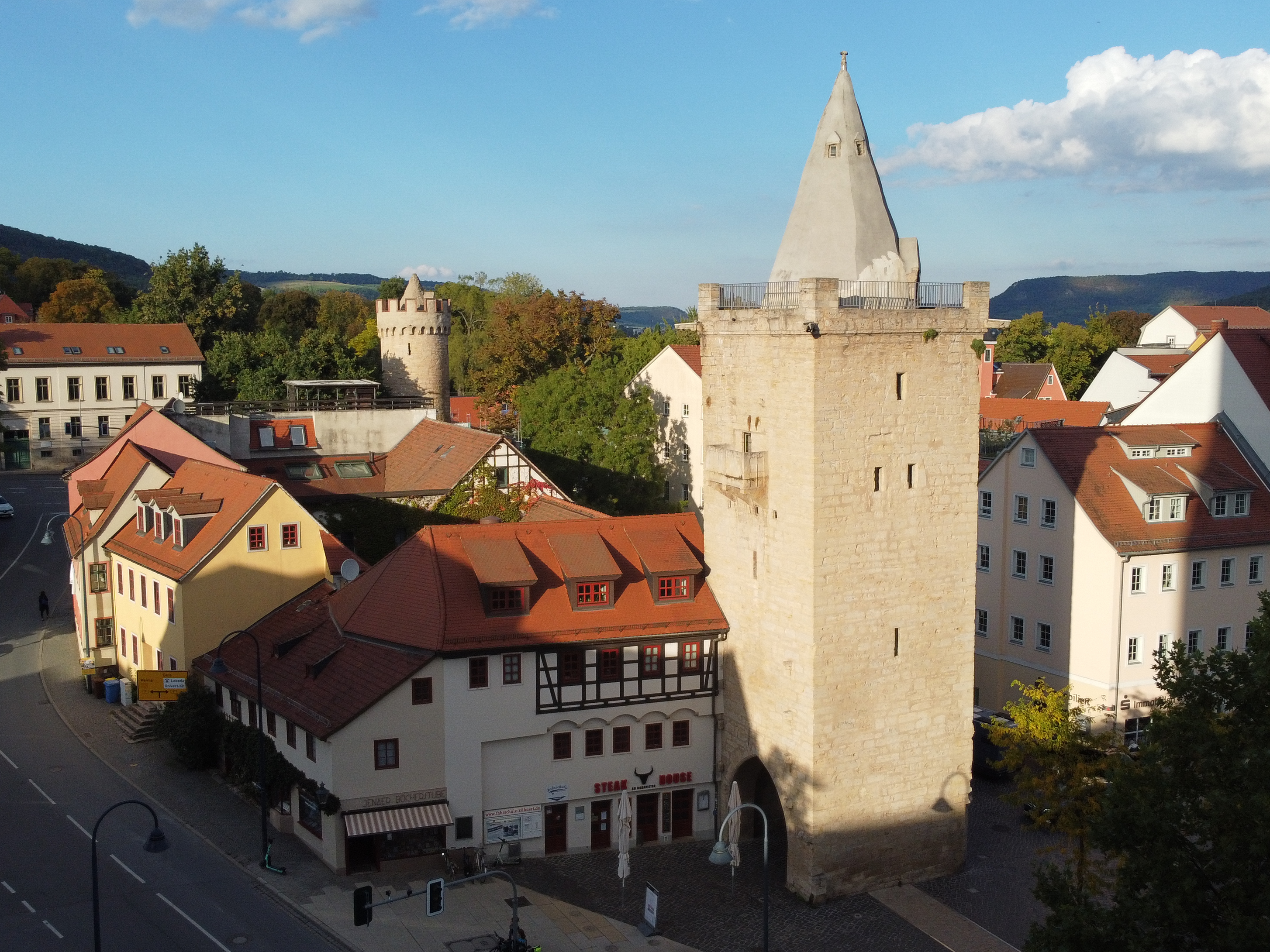
Aerial view, 2022

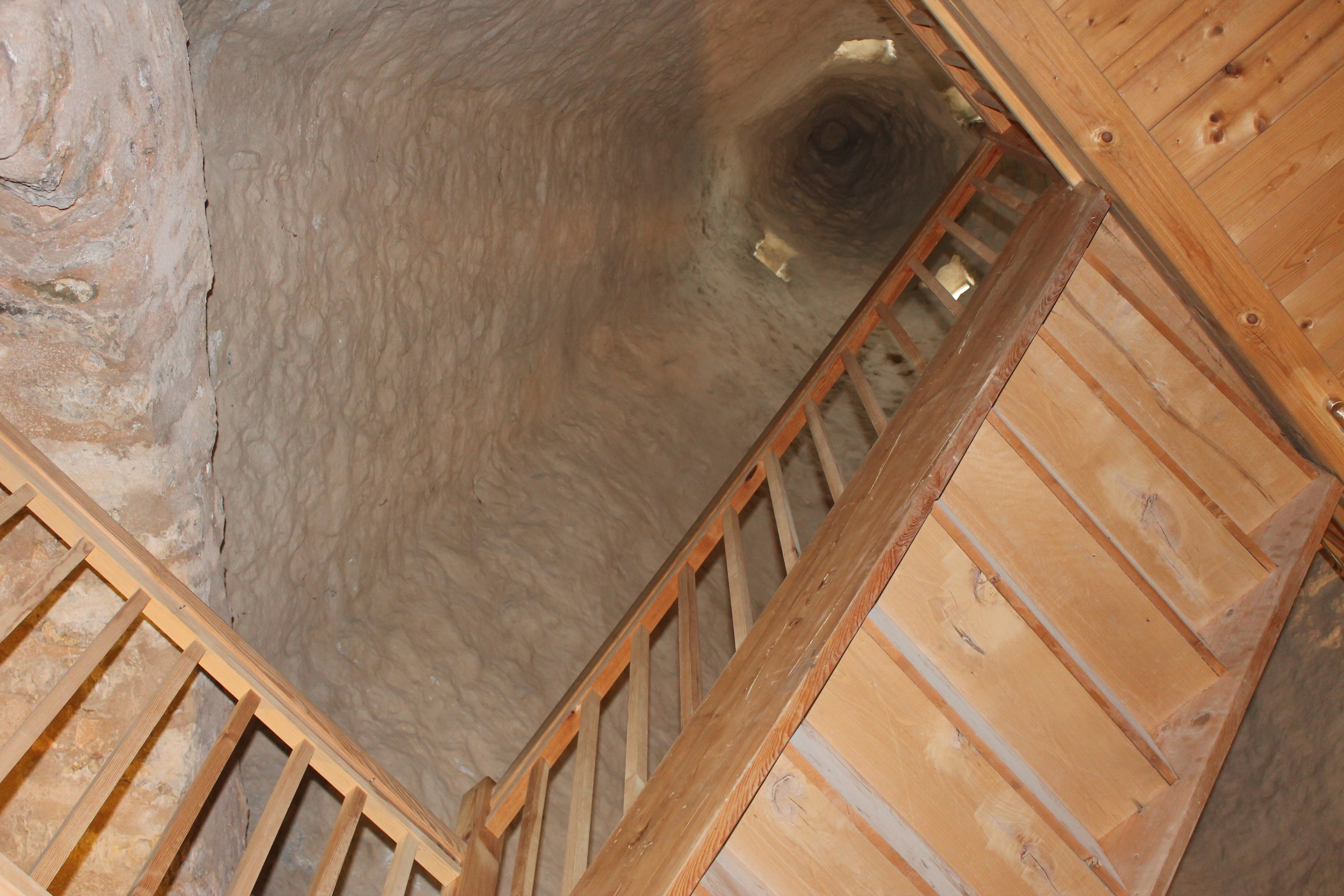
Wooden stairs in the interior

The Johannistor is the only remaining preserved city gate of the city of Jena, Thuringia, Germany. As part of the medieval city wall, it is connected to the Pulverturm (a tower, also preserved) via a reconstructed walkway. The outer gate remained in existence until the beginning of the nineteenth century, when it was demolished as a result of increasing traffic. Until the houses lining the south side of Johannisstrasse were demolished in 1968, the Johannistor remained the only western entrance to the old town of Jena.

== History and description ==
The first written reference to the western gate tower dates to 1304. In the fifteenth century, it was reconstructed in the late Gothic style featuring the addition of a bay window. The tower features a square floor plan with dimensions of 7.72 m x 7.85 m; its total height is 31.70 m. The only access to the tower was from the ramparts of the city wall, over a narrow gate situated at a height of 7.75 m above ground. Inside, the upper storeys are accessed by means of ladders and stairs. Above the passageway of the gate is a stone vault, in the centre of which there is an opening for pouring. The other floors are finished with wooden beams and ceilings. The stone Turmpyramide, the pyramidal roof of the tower, has a height of 9.20 m and sits on the tower gallery, which is located at 22.50 m above ground. The tower has a total weight of 2,181 tonnes according to the building surveys. The tower spire, which was designed as a gabled flower, has always held a weather vane.

The interior is illuminated mainly by narrow slit windows, and the top of the tower also features several openings to vent smoke. In the Middle Ages, the tower was used by the city guard, who were also tasked with providing fire protection for the nearby urban area.

A bay window built upon stone consoles projects out from the tower facade; this is popularly called the "Käsekorb" (cheese basket). A statue of a holy figure once adorned the tower; it was placed under a stone baldachin, the remains of which are still recognizable. A comprehensive renovation of the gate was performed in 1816, and the most recent renovation was completed in 2001.

== Neighbourhood ==
Outside the gate was the Johannisvorstadt, one of four former suburbs of Jena. Further west, a trade route led to the nearby cities of Weimar and Erfurt along the route of #7 highway (still called Erfurter Straße in Jena).

After passing through or around the Johannisstor, one can reach St. Michael's Church via Johannisstraße.

In the immediate vicinity of the Johannisstor is the Philistine fountain (built 2004) and the JenTower.

Among students of the University of Jena, there remains a longstanding custom of avoiding the gate out of superstition, as it is claimed that if one passes through the gate one will not pass one's next exam.
