= Weimar Princely Free Drawing School =

Former art school in Weimar, Germany

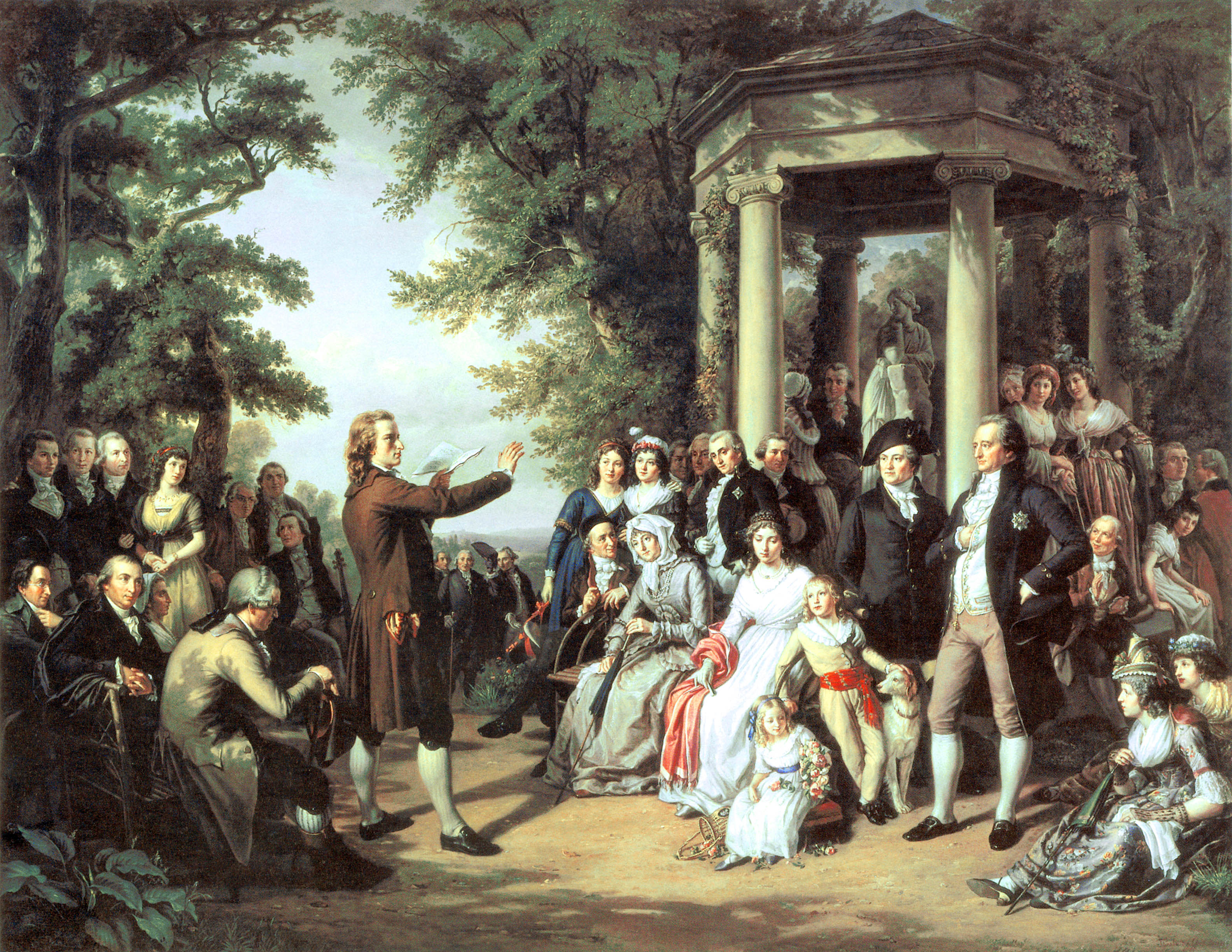
Theobald von Oer (1807–1885): The Weimar Court of the Muses. – In 1860, 55 years after Schiller's death in 1805, this oil painting was produced of a reading of his poems in the park of the Schloss Tiefurt. Among the listeners, to the right, is Goethe.

The Weimar Princely Free Drawing School (German: Fürstliche freie Zeichenschule Weimar) was an art and literature educational establishment. It was set up in 1776 in Weimar by the scholar and ducal private-secretary Friedrich Justin Bertuch (1747–1822) and the painter Georg Melchior Kraus (1737–1806), as part of Weimar Classicism. It was financed by the young Charles Augustus, Grand Duke of Saxe-Weimar-Eisenach and heavily promoted by Goethe, who also taught there. Among its pupils were Charles Augustus's future mistress Karoline Jagemann. It lasted until 1930.

As Weimar's Geheimer Rat had oversight over the school from 1788 to 1832, it is not to be confused with the Großherzoglich-Sächsischen Kunstschule Weimar (set up in 1860), the original version of the Weimarer Kunsthochschule. The school's classrooms were originally housed in the Roten Schloss, moving into the Fürstenhaus in 1807 and later moving partly to the Esplanade and partly to the Großen Jägerhaus. From 1824/25, under the oversight of custodian and painter Louise Seidler (1786–1866), it also housed the grand-ducal art collection.

== Aims ==
The foundation of the school is a clear indication of the rising interest in arts and crafts in court circles in the second half of 18th century. Its immediate main aim was to instruct local craftsmen in drawing, to sharpen their sense of aesthetics in consumables and in the longer term to increase the quality of production in handcrafts. In order to disseminate art, taste and a sense of beauty to as wide a public as possible, the lessons and living quarters were open to all classes and both sexes. It was an important place for the discovery and promotion of new talent and drew many artists into the orbit of Weimar Classicism and its "Musenhof".

To complete its pupils' knowledge and artistic talents by comparison and copying, from 1809 the school also developed its own collection of major paintings, giving exhibitions from 1809, which were generally housed from 1824/25 in the Grossen Jägerhaus. From 1837 the dissolved grand-ducal art collection was also put at the school's disposal.

The school's first annual exhibition, for the pupils to display their work publicly, was in 1779. The prize related to the exhibition was traditionally awarded on 3 September, the birthday of Charles Augustus.

The school found a competitor in 1860 with the foundation of the Grossherzogliche Kunstschule, and from then until its dissolution in 1930 the school gave preparatory lessons for students entering the Kunstschule.

== Related people ==
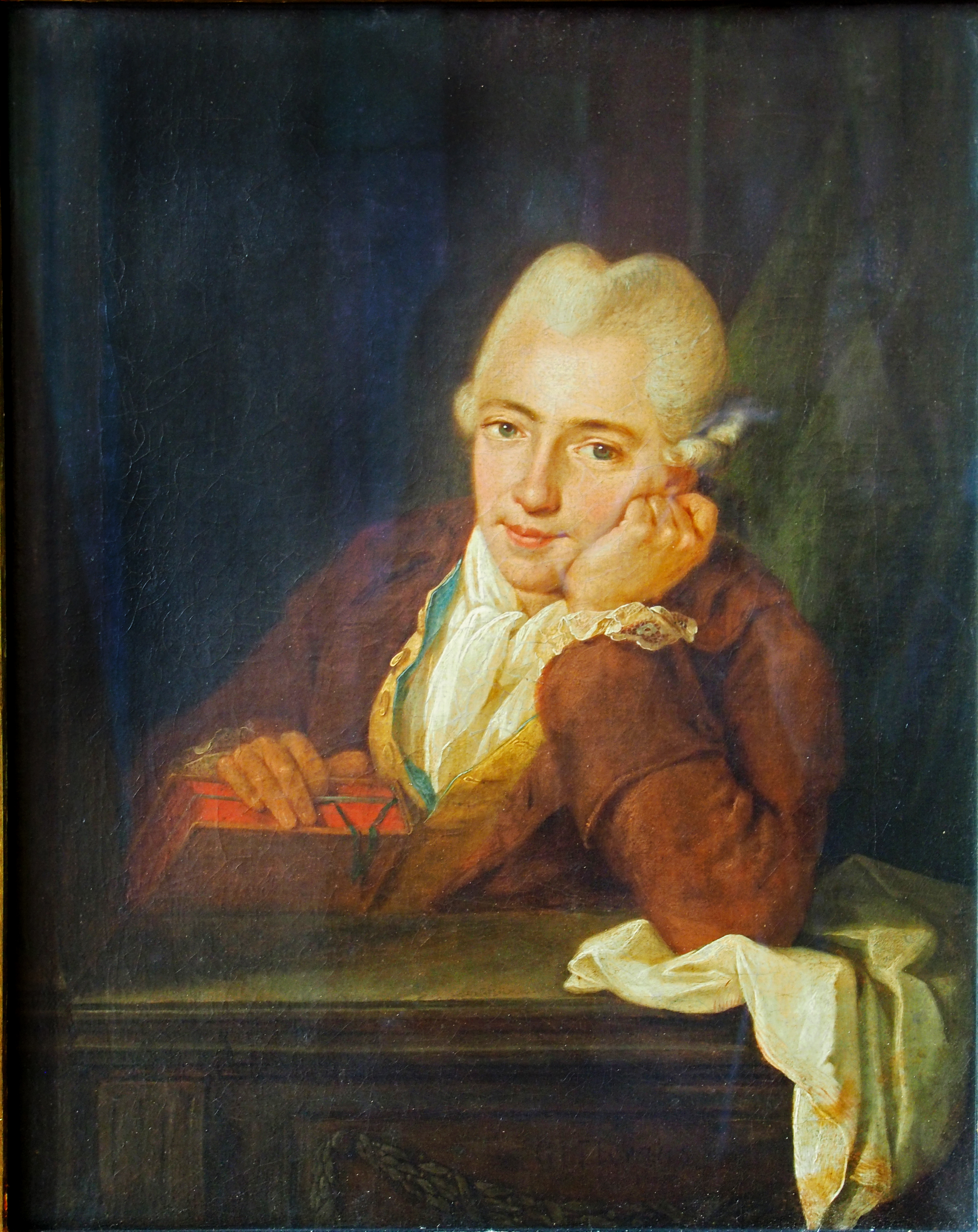
Georg Melchior Kraus, Self-portrait

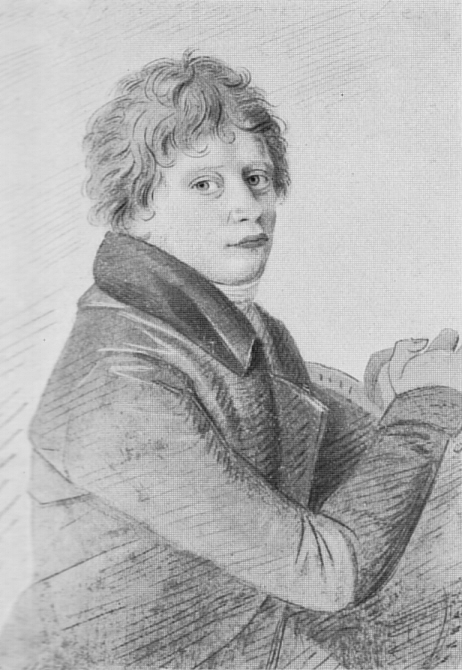
Ferdinand Jagemann, Self-portrait

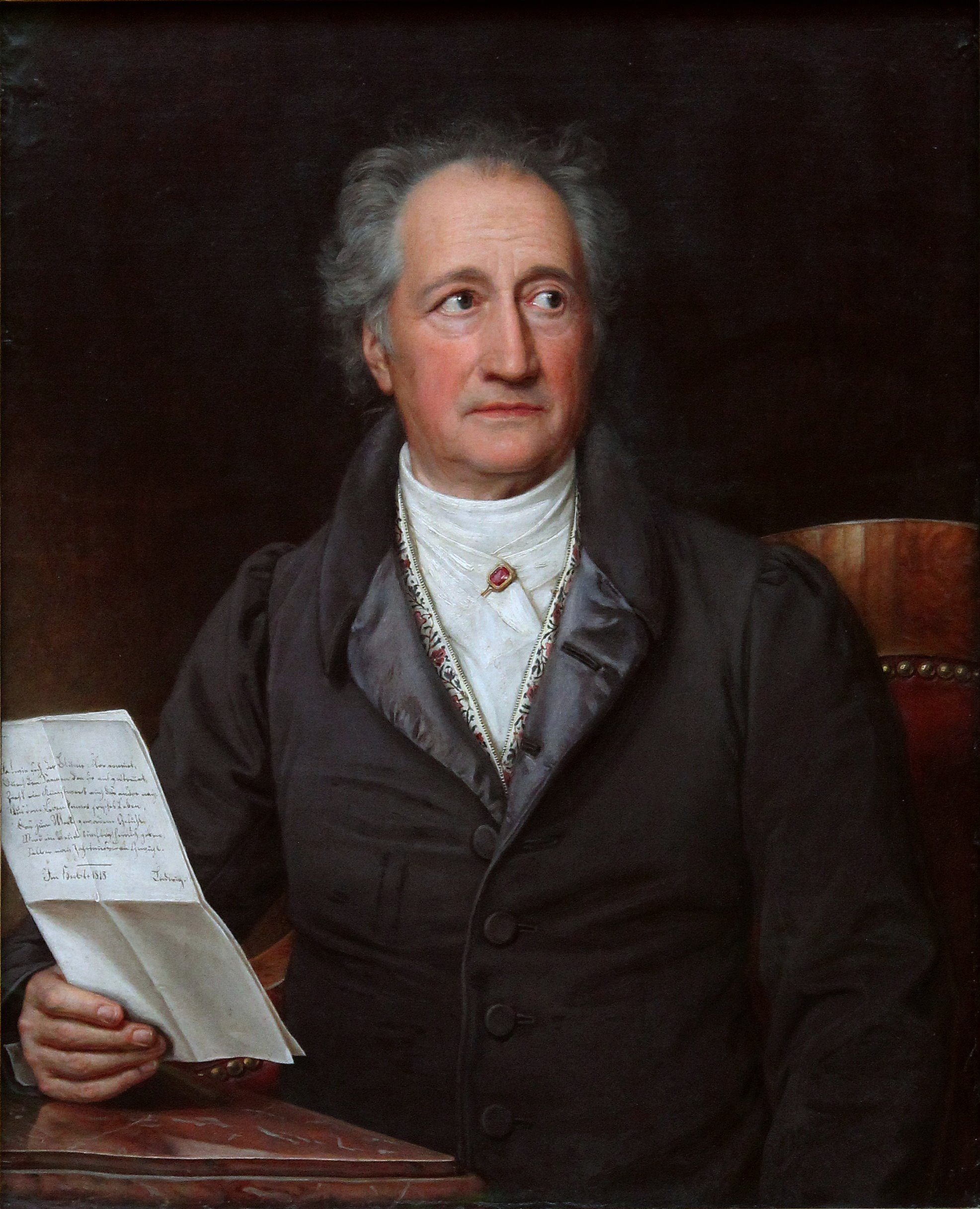
Johann Wolfgang von Goethe; by Joseph Karl Stieler

=== Directors ===
- 1776–1806: Georg Melchior Kraus (1737–1806), painter and etcher, see above
- 1807–1832: Johann Heinrich Meyer (1760–1832), painter and artwriter, friend of Goethe, Lecturer from 1795
- 1833–1842: Ludwig von Schorn (1793-1842), Art Lecturer, Custodian of the Grand-Ducal Art Collection
- 1842–1861: Gustav Adolf Schöll (1805–1882), archaeologist, librarian and historian of literature
- 1861–1868: Johann Christian Schuchardt (1799–1870), copper engraver, former private secretary of Goethe.
- 1868–1873: Friedrich Preller the Elder (1804–1878), former pupil, painter and etcher, lecturer from 1843
- 1873: Sixtus Armin Thon (1817–1901), former pupil, painter, etcher and lithographer, 1873 interim director
- 1896-1917: Hugo Flintzer (1862–1917), painter (Max Thedy's pupil)
- 1917-1926: Franz Goepfart (1866-1926), painter (Max Thedy's pupil)
- 1926-1930: Arno Metzeroth (1874-1937), painter (Künstlerkolonie Schwaan)

=== Teachers ===
Besides the directors, these figures also taught at the school:

- 1776: Martin Gottlieb Klauer (1742-1801), sculptor
- 1795: Konrad Horny (1764-1807), engraver
- until 1820: Ferdinand Jagemann (1780–1820), painter

=== Pupils ===
Sorted by class, its pupils included:

- Caroline Jagemann (1735–1804), singer and actor
- Johann Wolfgang von Goethe (1749–1832) and his grandson Wolfgang
- Charlotte von Stein (1742–1827), courtier, friend of Goethe
- Corona Schröter (1751–1802), singer and actor, central figure in Goethe's Liebhabertheater
- Julie von Egloffstein (1792–1869), courtier, later a painter
- Franz Horny (1798–1824), later a painter
- Friedrich Preller the Elder (1804–1878), later painter, teacher and director of the school (see above)
- Franziska Schultze (1805–1859), later a flower painter
- Angelica Facius (1806–1887), later a flower painter and medal-designer
- Ferdinand Bellermann (1814–1889), later a landscape painter
- Friedrich Martersteig (1814–1899), later a painter
- Sixtus Armin Thon (1817–1901), later painter and interim director of the school (see above)
- Carl Hummel (1821–1907), later a painter
- Karl Hagemeister (1848–1933), later a painter
- Magda Langenstraß-Uhlig (1888-1965), later Absolventin of the Großherzoglich-Sächsischen Kunstschule
- Marianne Brandt (1893–1983), later painter, sculptor and designer

== Bibliography ==
- (in German) Kerrin Klinger (Hrsg): Kunst und Handwerk in Weimar, Böhlau, 2008, Köln
