= Johann Heinrich Meyer =

Swiss artist (1760–1832)

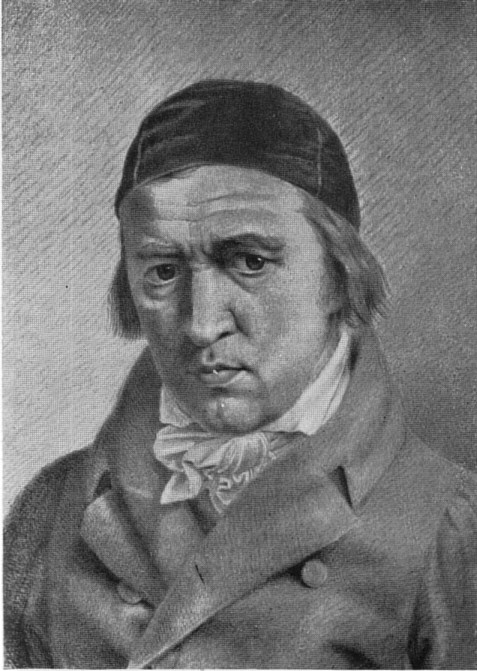
- Self-portrait
- Born: 16 March 1760; Stäfa, Switzerland
- Died: 14 October 1832 (aged 72); Jena

Johann Heinrich Meyer (16 March 1760 – 11 October 1832) was a Swiss painter, engraver and art critic. He served as the second Director of the Weimar Princely Free Drawing School. A close associate of Johann Wolfgang von Goethe, he was often referred to as "Goethemeyer".

== Biography ==
Meyer was born in Stäfa, near Lake Zürich in Switzerland. His father, Johann Baptist Meyer, was a merchant from Zürich. He took his first drawing lessons at the age of sixteen. Two years later the painter, Johann Caspar Füssli, introduced him to the works of the archaeologist and art critic, Johann Joachim Winckelmann. His History of the Art of Antiquity was decisive in shaping Meyer's attitudes and approach to art.

In 1784, he went to Rome to join the German "colony". Two years later, he met Goethe, who was apparently impressed with Meyer's knowledge. In 1788, he moved to Naples and worked as a drawing teacher. Later, he visited his hometown in Switzerland with Goethe, who gathered material on William Tell that he would pass along to Friedrich Schiller. He got together with Goethe again, in 1790, and accompanied him to Weimar, where he would live for the rest of his life. Until 1802, he lived with Goethe.

In 1795, after a study trip to Italy, he became a Professor at the Weimar Princely Free Drawing School. Three years later, he and Goethe began publishing a short-lived art journal; Propyläen. He was placed in charge of managing the paintings and decorations at Schloss Weimar in 1799, following a major reconstruction overseen by Goethe.

In 1803, he married Amalie von Koppenfels (1771–1825), the youngest daughter of Johann Friedrich Kobe von Koppenfels (1737–1811), a confidential government councilor at the Grand Ducal Court in Jena. They had no children.

From 1804, he published articles on art history in the Allgemeine Literatur-Zeitung, signed with the initials, "W.K.F". In 1805, he contributed a chapter on 18th century art to Goethe's compilation, Winckelmann and His Century. The following year, he was appointed to succeed the late Georg Melchior Kraus as Director of the Weimar Princely Free Drawing School.

He received the honorary title of Councilor in 1807. From 1809 to 1815, he was engaged in writing his History of Art, which was published posthumously, as was the last volume of his three-volume work, A History of the Fine Arts Among the Greeks. He also made contributions to Goethe's Theory of Colours.

Meyer died 11 October 1832 in Jena.
