= Georg Melchior Kraus =

German painter (1737–1806)

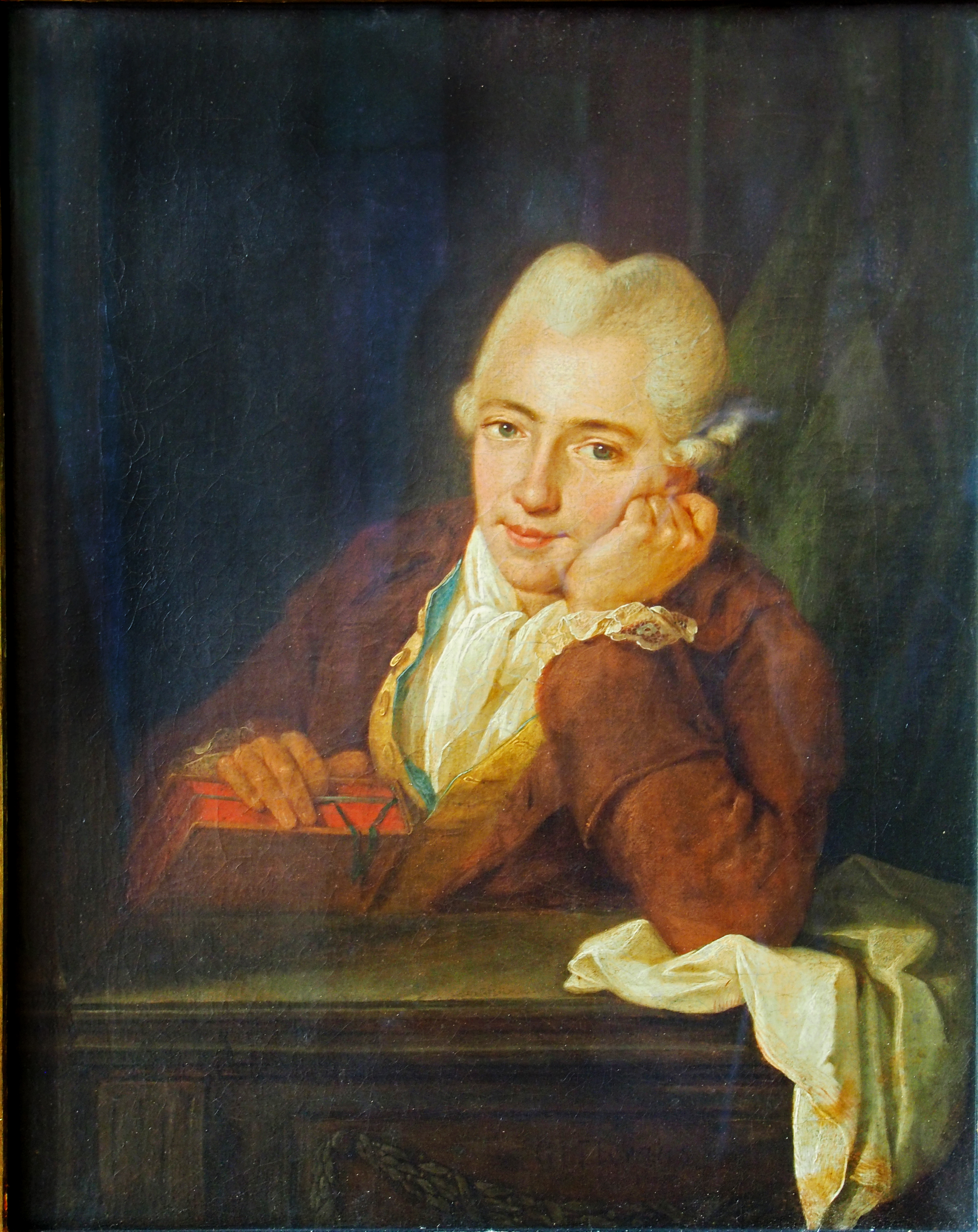
Self-portrait (1775)

Georg Melchior Kraus (26 July 1737 – 5 November 1806) was a German painter. He was a co-founder of the Weimar Princely Free Drawing School, together with Friedrich Justin Bertuch, in 1776.

== Life ==
He was born in Frankfurt am Main as the sixth of nine children, five of whom died while infants. His parents, Cornelia and Johann, operated an inn called "Zur weissen Schlangen" (At the White Snakes) in Frankfurt. Cornelia died when he was eight, and Johann remarried that same year.

From 1759 to 1762, he worked with Johann Heinrich Tischbein at his studio in Kassel, which was attached to the court of Frederick II, Landgrave of Hesse-Kassel. In 1762, he travelled to Paris to study with the engraver Johann Georg Wille. While there, he also befriended the genre painter Jean-Baptiste Greuze.

After returning to Frankfurt, in 1766, he worked as a private drawing teacher. His notable students included Sophie von La Roche, Friedrich Heinrich Jacobi and Johann Wolfgang von Goethe. In 1767, he gathered signatures on a petition to establish an art academy there, but was not successful. Over the next few years, he was an itinerant painter, but maintained his home base in Frankfurt.

It was in Erfurt in 1773 that he met Christoph Martin Wieland and Friedrich Justin Bertuch, who introduced him at the court in Weimar. As it turned out, Bertuch was the confidential secretary to Duke Karl August. In 1774, he and Bertuch proposed to create a drawing school. The following year, after contacting Goethe to tell him about the situation in Weimar, he settled there permanently. In 1776, when Karl August took over the government, his first two acts were inviting Goethe to come there, and establishing what would become known as the "Princely Free Drawing School". Kraus was appointed the first Director and held that position until his death.

In 1786, he and Bertuch began publishing the Journal des Luxus und der Moden, generally considered to be one of the world's first fashion magazines. Kraus provided the copper engravings, taken from drawings produced at the school. It was published until 1827. After 1790, they also created picture books for children.

In 1806, following the Battle of Jena–Auerstedt, victorious French troops overran and plundered Weimar. Kraus' home was raided and he was seriously injured. Bertuch rescued him and cared for him, but he died just over two weeks later. He was interred at the Jacobsfriedhof.

== Gallery ==
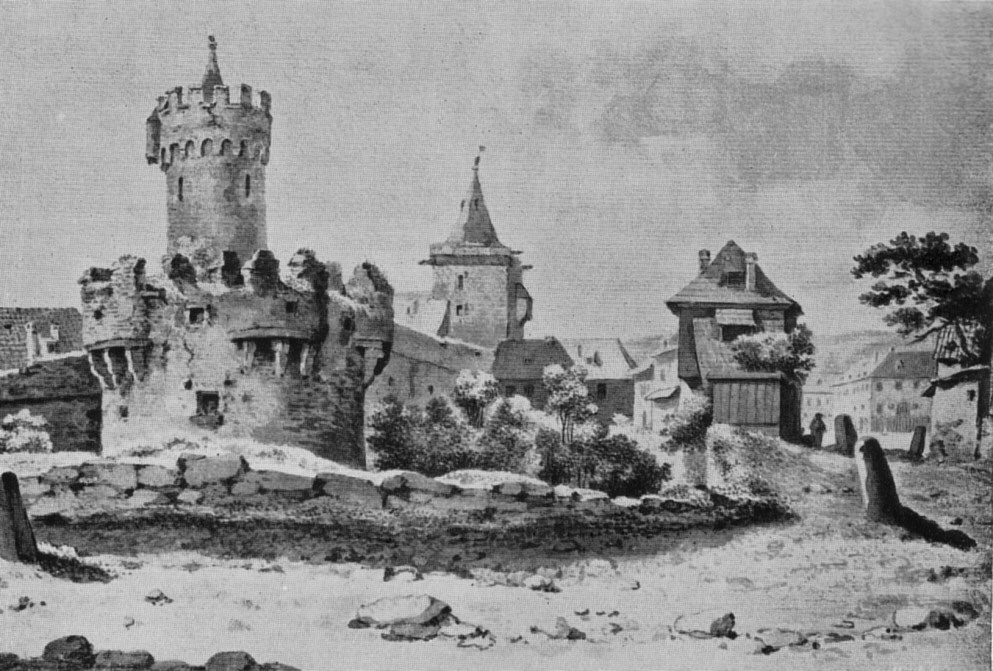
The Powder House and
Johannistor in Jena

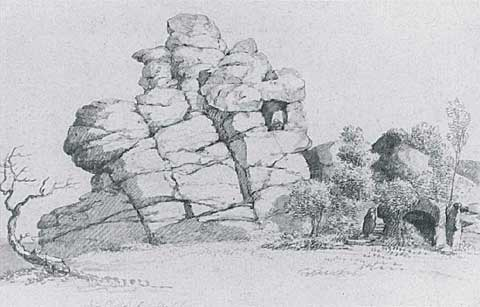
The Klusfelsen, near Goslar

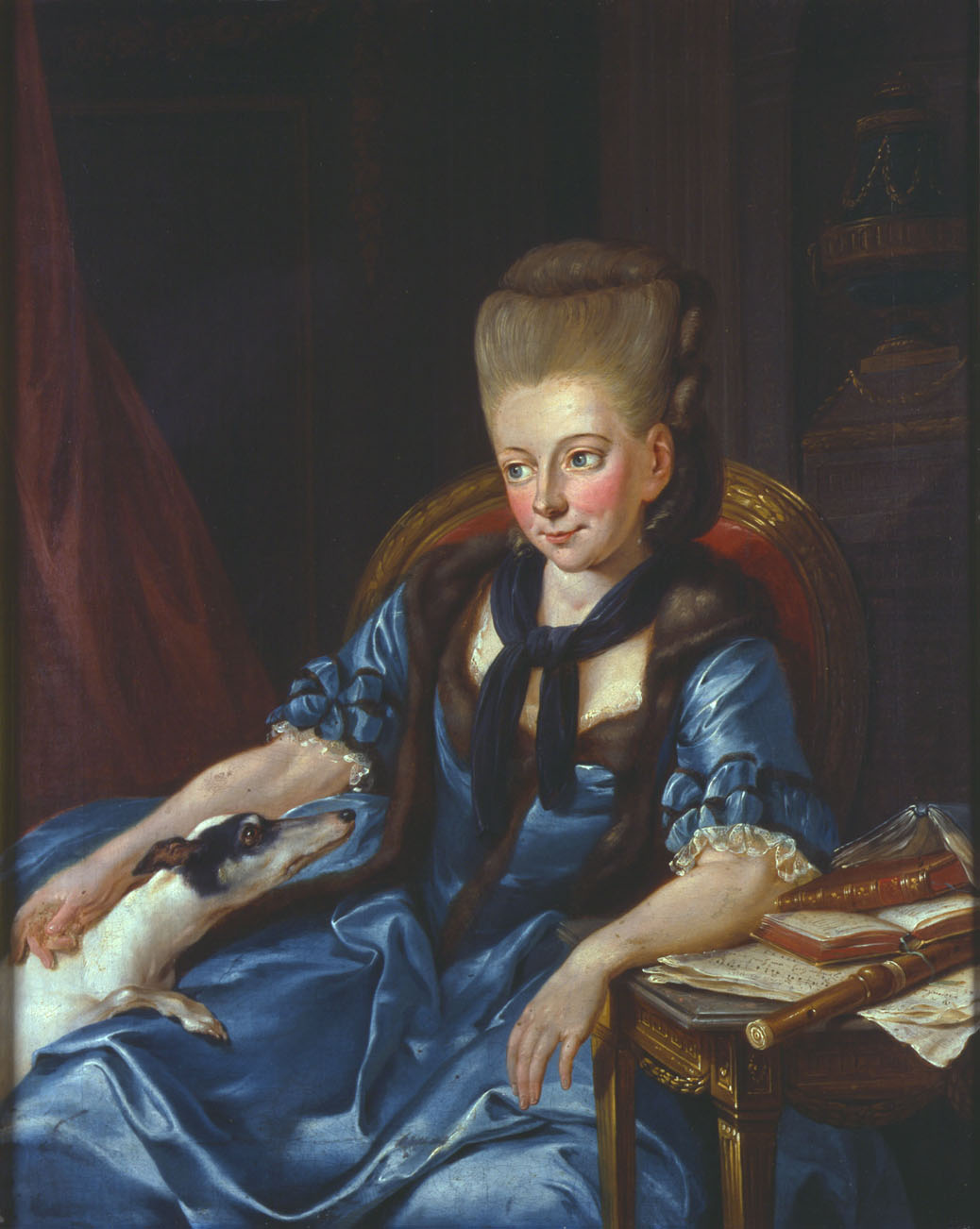
Duchess Anna Amalia of Brunswick-Wolfenbüttel

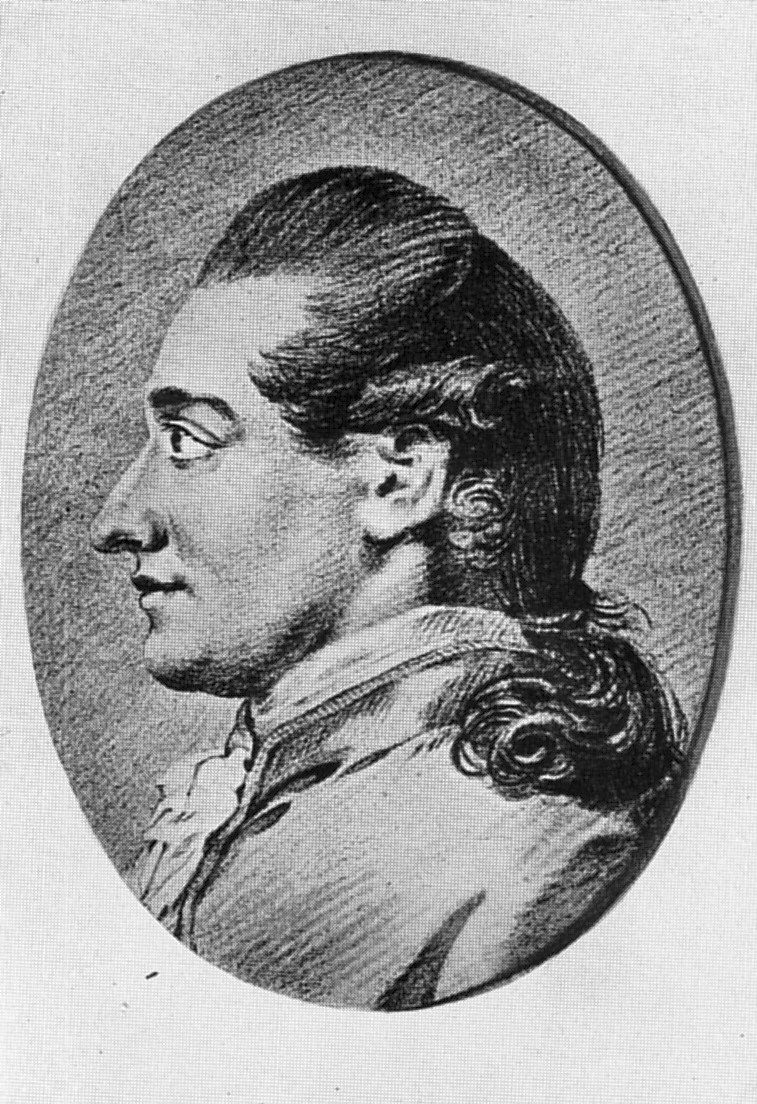
Johann Wolfgang von Goethe

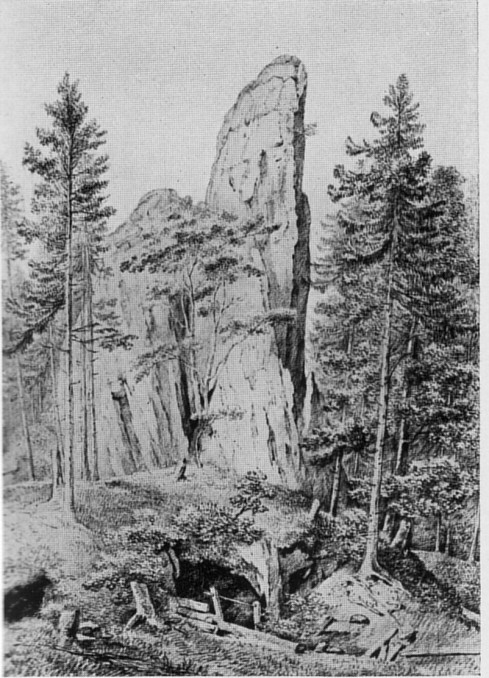
The Hübichenstein, in Harz

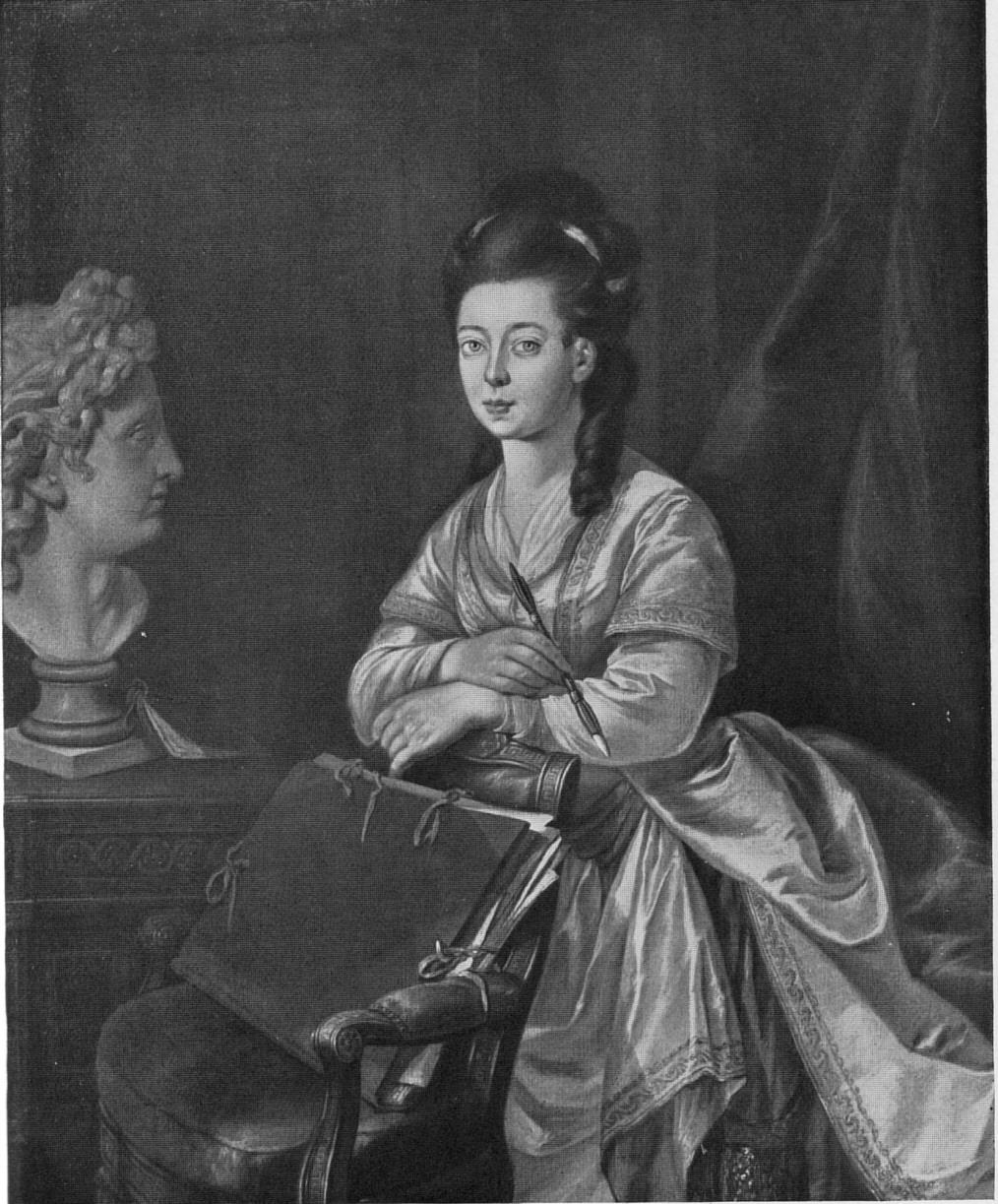
Princess Louise of Hesse-Darmstadt

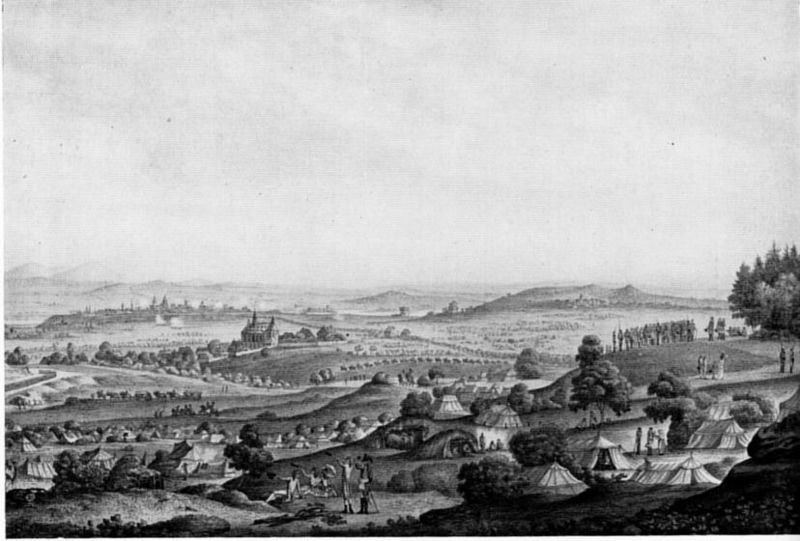
Siege of Mainz (1793)

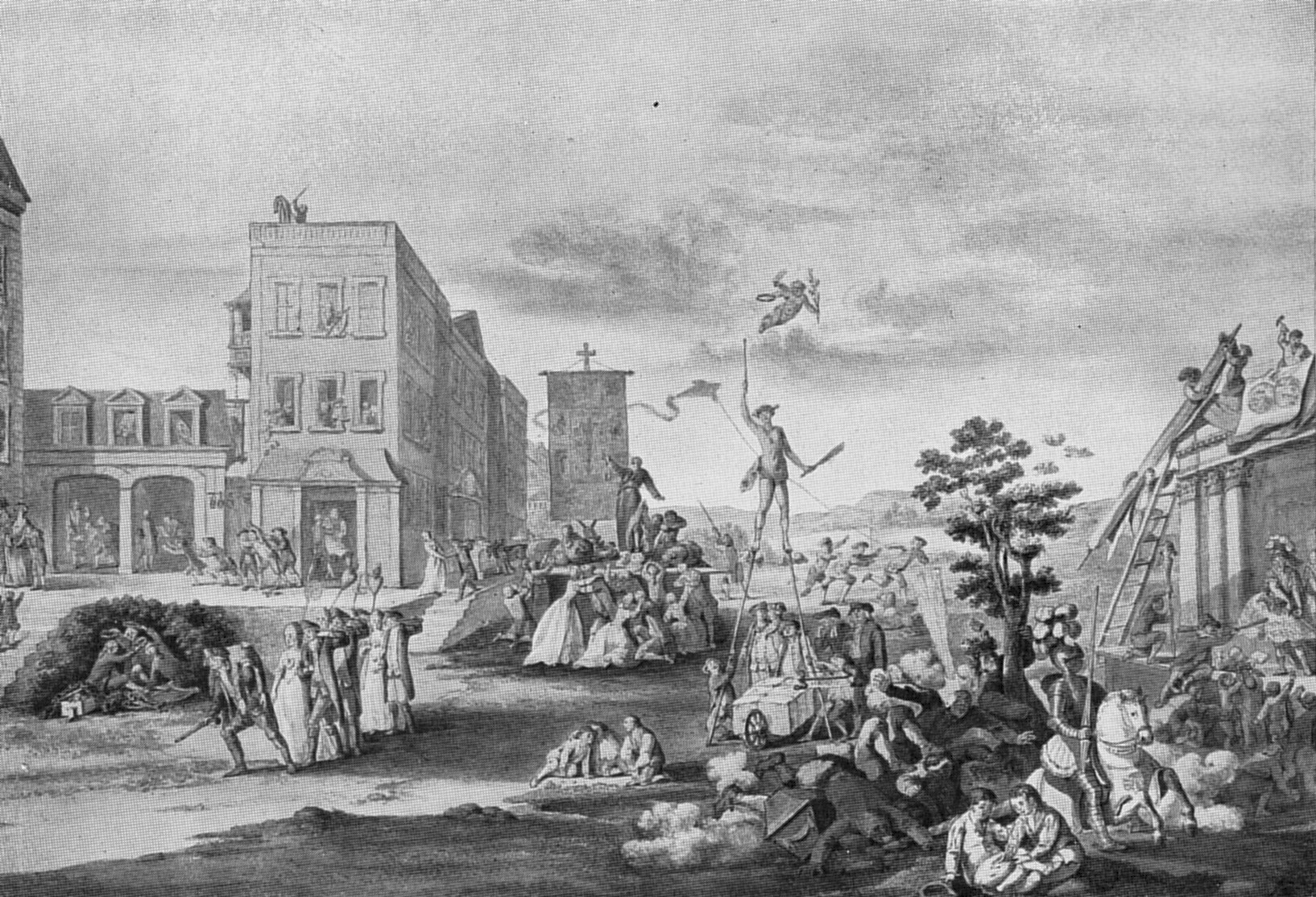
The Fair at Plundersweilern

== Literary work ==
- Georg Melchior Kraus: ABC des Zeichners, von G. M. Kraus, Herzogl. S. W. Rath und Director der herzogl. Freien Zeichenschule in Weimar, 5. Aufl. Weimar 1810.

== Bibliography ==
- Birgit Knorr: Georg Melchior Kraus (1737 - 1806) : Maler - Pädagoge - Unternehmer; Biographie und Werkverzeichnis (Dissertation), Download als PDF
- Hans Wahl, Anton Kippenberg: Goethe und seine Welt, Insel-Verlag, Leipzig 1932 S.45, 56, 58f, 79f, 87, 95, 131, 139
- Gisold Lammel: Georg Melchior Kraus – Bildchronist im Weimar der Aufklärung und Klassik, in: Derselbe, Tagträume. Bilder im Lichte der Aufklärung, Amsterdam 1993, S. 185 193.
- Christine u. Markus Meissner: In der Freiheit der Berge - Auf Goethes Spuren im Harz, Weimar 1989.
- Eberhard Freiherr Schenk zu Schweinsberg: Verzeichnis der Radierungen von Georg Melchior Kraus, in: Jahrbuch der Sammlung Kippenberg, Bd. 7, (1927/28), Leipzig 1928, S. 277–302. (Ergänzungen in Jahrbuch d. Slg. Kippenberg, Bd. 10, S. 316–318).
- Eberhard Freiherr Schenk zu Schweinsberg: Georg Melchior Kraus, Weimar 1930 (= Schriften der Goethe-Gesellschaft, 43. Band).
- Konrad Paul: Die ersten hundert Jahre 1774-1873. Zur Geschichte der Weimarer Mal- und Zeichenschule, Weimar 1996.
- Fritz Kühnlenz: Der Maler – Georg Melchior Kraus, in: Derselbe, Weimarer Porträts. Männer und Frauen um Goethe und Schiller, Rudolstadt 1961, S. 347–360.
- Ernst Beutler: Georg Melchior Kraus, in: Derselbe, Essays um Goethe, Bremen 1957, S. 417–443.
