= Fashion journalism =

Type of journalism

Fashion journalism is a component of fashion media, with a focus on writing and photojournalism. Fashion journalists write about and critique fashion events and trends as well as cultivate and maintain relationships with stylists and designers. Fashion journalists are either employed full-time by a publication, or submit articles on a freelance basis. Fashion photography, which supplanted fashion illustration in the 1900s, is a type of photojournalism used in fashion journalism. The Internet has given rise to several outlets for amateur fashion journalism, such as blogs and vlogs.

== History ==
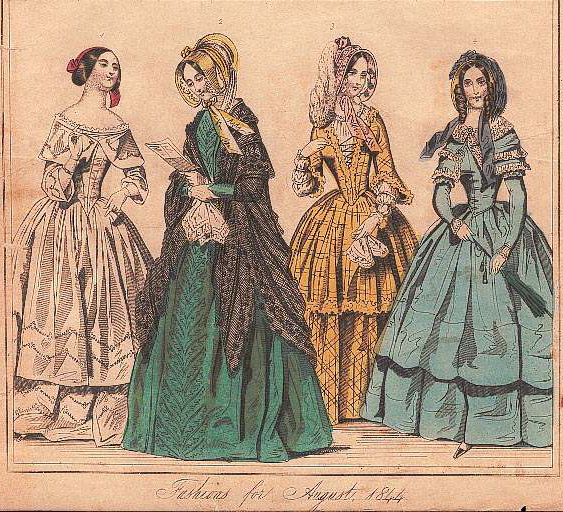
An example of a fashion plate (1844)

Fashion journalism developed during the 18th century, when the fashion dolls – dolls designed to display relevant fashion ensembles – were replaced by fashion magazines, notably the Cabinet des Modes, which is recognized to be the first true fashion magazine. This Partisan publication had illustrated fashion plates that "...fed the increasing appetite for French fashion, which was growing in tandem with the expanding urban population's desire to separate itself from the way of life plotted out and decreed by the French Court". It was followed abroad by Journal des Luxus und der Moden (1786–1827) in Germany, Giornale delle Dame e delle Mode di Francia (1786–1794) in Milan, and Gallery of Fashion (1794–1803) in Britain.

During the 19th century, numerous fashion magazines were published, employing fashion journalists reporting on the latest trends from Paris. Among the earliest in Great Britain were Ann Margaret Lanchester, who published her own fashion paper, the Le Miroir de la Mode, and Mary Ann Bell, writing for the La Belle Assemblée in the early 19th-century.

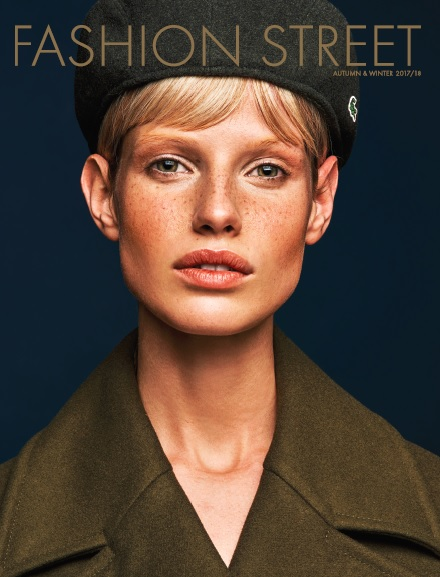
A 21st century fashion magazine cover

Fashion magazines of the 20th century include Elle and Vogue.

=== Digital fashion journalism ===
As society increases its dependence on the internet, the journalism industry is becoming far more fluid. Printing, being more costly and less convenient, many publications (such as Nylon magazine) have opted to focus on digital publication. Digital journalism gives the writer unlimited space (rather than forcing an article to fit in a magazine or newspaper layout), and allows for links to external resources, and many images. Another major advantage of digital media is real-time updates/corrections to misinformation.

Major fashion magazines such as Vogue, Elle, Marie Claire, Cosmopolitan, and Paper Magazine have altered their business models due to the onset of the digital age, creating an online component in addition to print. Social media has also contributed to the rise in these digital magazine platforms, allowing them to be far more interactive than they have been in the past.

=== Amateur fashion journalism ===
The Internet has given rise to a number of outlets for amateur fashion journalism, such as blogs and vlogs.

== Education ==
Journalism is a general liberal arts major that can be studied at many universities. A concentration in fashion journalism is specific to a number of fashion schools. Generally, a fashion journalist needs at least a BA in fields such as journalism, communications, fashion or other related areas. A strong portfolio and experience in reporting on fashion is key to being hired as a fashion journalist post-grad.

== Notable fashion journalists ==
Vanessa Friedman is the chief fashion director and fashion critic for The New York Times. Before joining the team at the Times, Friedman was the first fashion editor at the Financial Times, alongside her job editing the pages of Luxury360 vertical. Previously, she was the features editor for InStyle UK. She was the 2012 recipient of the Front Page Award for fashion writing and the 2013 Fashion Monitor Journalist of the Year award.

Robin Givhan is the first and only fashion journalist to win The Pulitzer Prize for Criticism as of 2006. She drew attention to her work after criticizing former US Vice President Dick Cheney for wearing casual attire (a ski cap and parka) to a ceremony commemorating the 60th anniversary of the liberation of Auschwitz. In this piece, Givhan stressed the importance of how political leaders choose to present themselves.

Cathy Horyn is the critic-at-large for New York Magazine's The Cut since 2015, having spent 15 years as the former chief critic of The New York Times with roles at The Washington Post and Vanity Fair. In 2001, she was awarded the Eugenia Sheppard Award for fashion writing by the Council of Fashion Designers of America.

Sarah Mower MBE is a chief critic and columnist for American Vogue. She is also an advocate for young designers as the Ambassador for Emerging talent at the British Fashion Council since 2009. Mower received the MBE in 2011 in recognition of her contributions to fashion.

Suzy Menkes OBE is a veteran fashion journalist who was most recently the Editor of Vogue International, departing in October 2020. She also helmed The New York Times International Edition back when it was the International Herald Tribune as its fashion critic for 25 years, ultimately departing for Condé Nast International in 2014. She now produces a podcast "Creative Conversations With Suzy Menkes" and contributes to Air Mail, a mobile-first digital weekly created by Graydon Carter.

== See also ==
- Fashion editor
- Fashion photography
- List of fashion magazines
