= Journal des Luxus und der Moden =

German fashion magazine

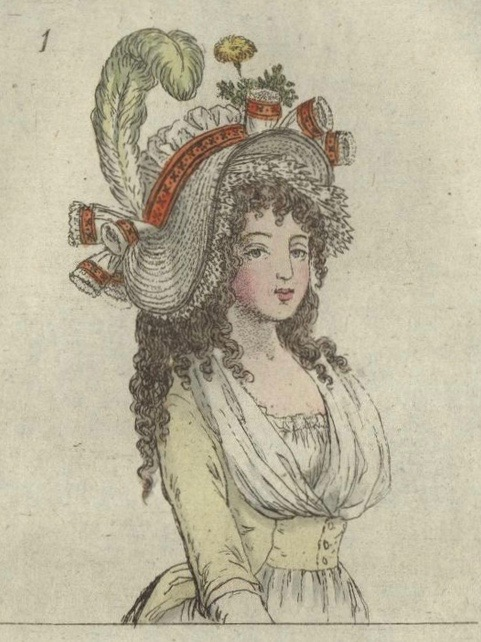
Journal des Luxus und der Moden, 1795

Journal des Luxus und der Moden, was a German fashion magazine, published between 1786 and 1827. It is recognized to be one of the first fashion magazines in the world.

The magazine was preceded by the Cabinet des Modes, which became the world's first fashion magazine one year prior, and was followed by Journal des Luxus und der Moden (1786-1827) in Germany and Giornale delle Dame e delle Mode di Francia in Italy (1786-1794), which thereby became the second and the third fashion magazine in the world, respectively. As the French fashion magazine was discontinued during the French Revolution, its two foreign successors came to have a leading role in the fashion journalism of Europa for several years, when the branch was still a new a pioneer one.
