= Gallery of Fashion =

Defunct British fashion magazine

The Gallery of Fashion was a British fashion magazine, published between 1794 and 1803. It was the first British fashion magazine, being the first publication in Britain devoted exclusively to fashion.

The magazine was published in London by Nicholas Heideloff. It was produced following the model of the first fashion magazine in Europe, the Cabinet des Modes, which had been both exported as well as copied in the rest of Europe but discontinued during the French revolution.

In a 2014 interview, historical author Candice Hern discussed, "several rare fashion prints from The Gallery of Fashion dated 1798".

Gallery of Fashion has been considered, "the antecedent to Vogue."

== Gallery ==
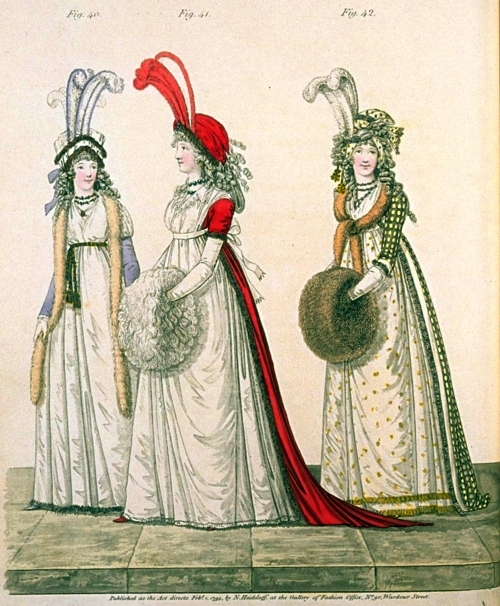
1794

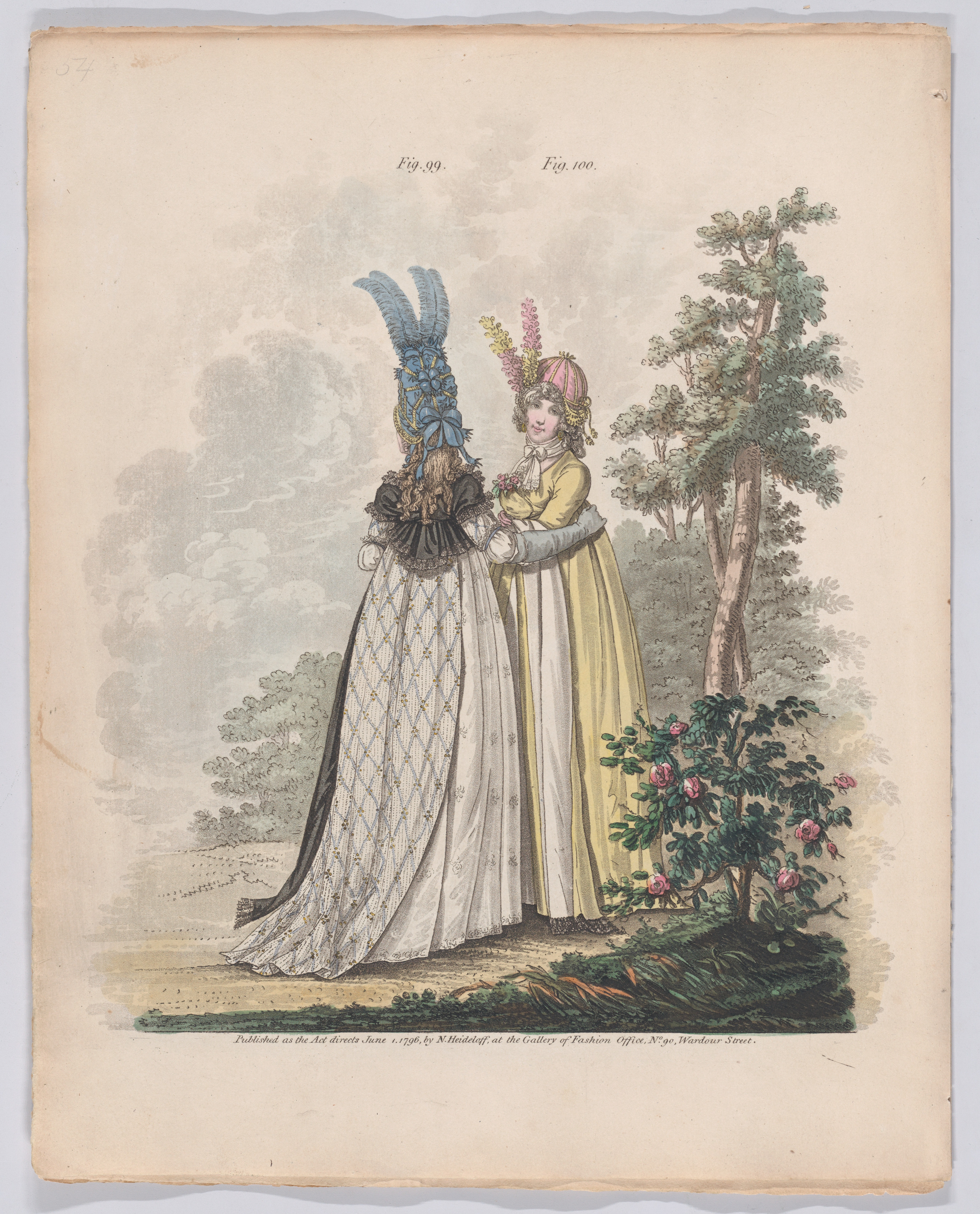
Gallery of Fashion, vol. III- April 1, 1796 - March 1, 1797.

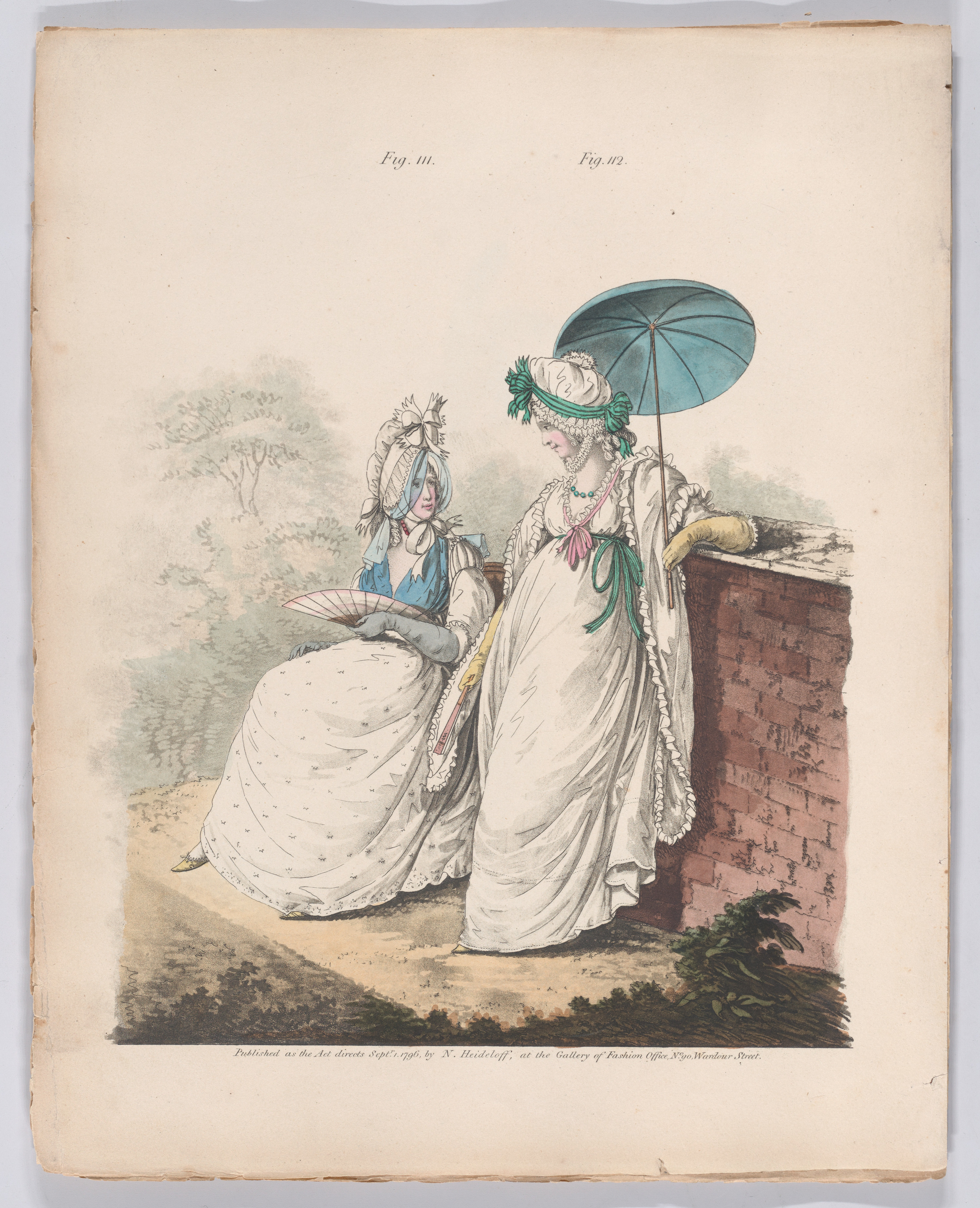
Gallery of Fashion, vol. III- April 1, 1796 - March 1, 1797.

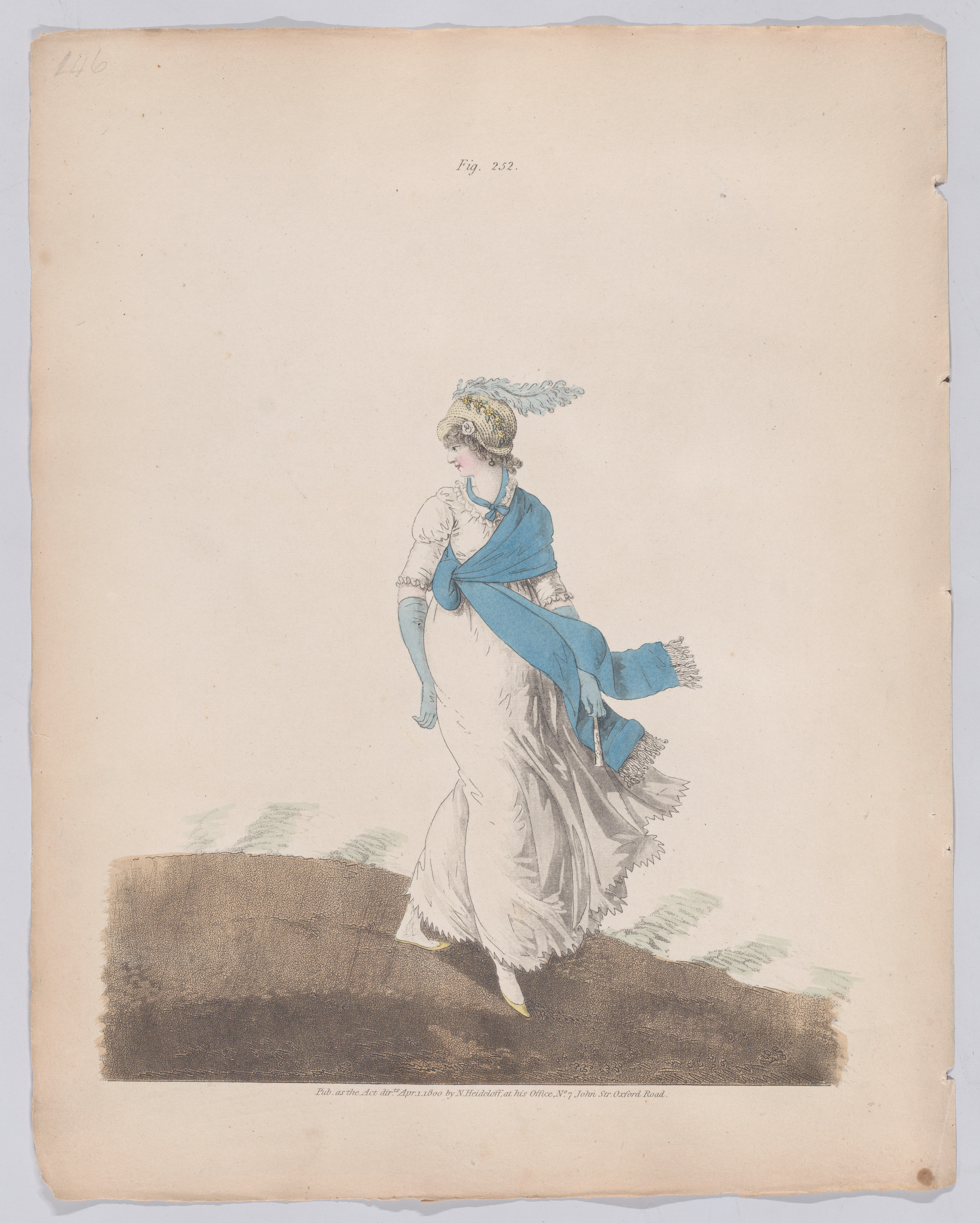
Gallery of Fashion, vol. VII- April 1, 1800 - March 1, 1801.
