= Cabinet des Modes =

French fashion magazine

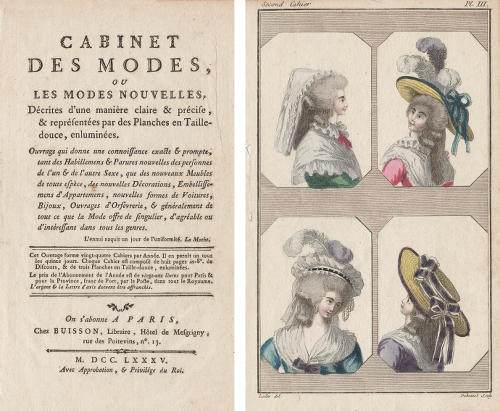
Cabinet des Modes, 1785.

Cabinet des Modes, with the title La Magasin des Modes Nouvelles Francaises et Anglaises (or Magasin des modes for short) in 1786–1789, and Le Journal de la Modet et du Gout in 1790–1793, was a French fashion magazine, published between 1785 and 1793. It is recognized to be the first fashion magazine.

== History ==
The magazine was preceded by the hugely expensive and exclusive Galerie des Modes et Costumes Français, which was published rarely and consisted of a series of decorative fashion plates, expanding on the fashion aspect idea of the almanach pocket books, which was popular during the 18th-century and normally contained one fashion plate each.

It was edited by Jean-Antoine Lebrun-Tossa and published by Bosse. It was issued every fifteen days, with eight pages and three plates each. The magazine contained the fashion of furnishings and decoration as well as clothing fashion. The text described the etiquette of fashion and gave its readers advise to when it was fashionable to wear a certain garment, and that certain seasons, occasions and period of the day was suitable for certain types of clothes, which was an innovation of the time and was to become a common feature of fashion magazines until the 1960s. It contained advertising by individual tailors, dressmakers and fashion merchants, who by this time had begun to issue brochures about their work, and it also functioned as a mail order catalog.

In contrast to the extremely expensive predecessor, the magazine was affordable with a prize of 21 livres. Cheaper than commercial agents and the pandora fashion dolls, and more numerous than the lonely fashion chapter or image of the almanachs, the magazine became a huge success with over 800 subscribers already in its first year of publication. Its affordable price made it into an organ by which the middle classes could acquire what was deemed to be good taste by the aristocracy, a democratization which was pointed out also by the magazine itself.

The Cabinet des Modes was an innovation and is considered to be the first proper fashion magazine in Europe and the world. The success in France followed by its export to the rest of Europe. To meet the competition, its example was soon followed abroad by Journal des Luxus und der Moden (1786-1827) in Germany, and Giornale delle Dame e delle Mode di Francia in Milan (1786-1794), Giornale Dedicato al Bel Sesso (1786-1788) in Venice and Gallery of Fashion in Britain (1794-1803), some of which were in fact plagiarized translations of the French predecessor.

The magazine was discontinued in 1793 during the rule of Robespierre, and succeeded after his fall by the Journal des dames et des modes (1797-1839).

== Gallery ==
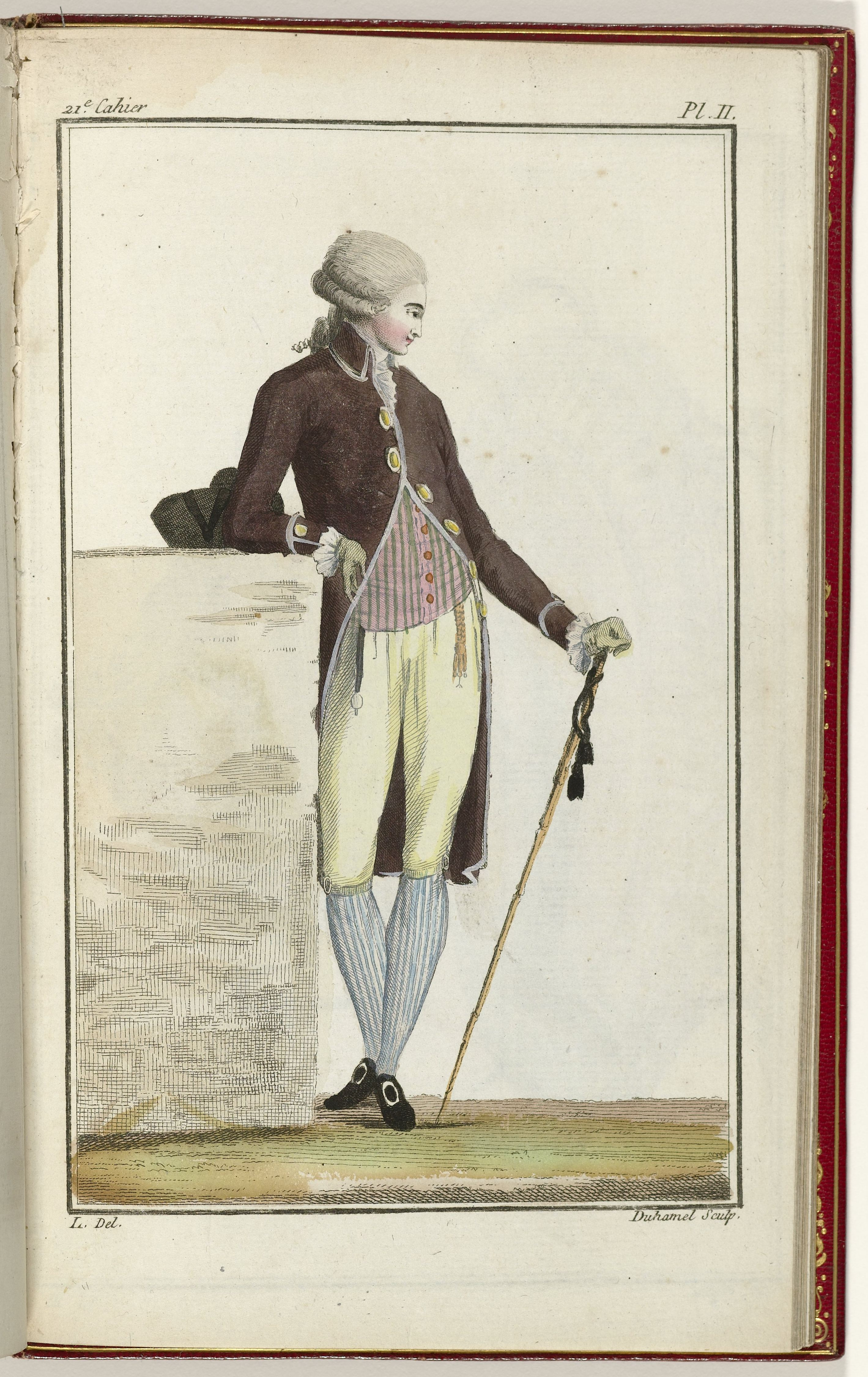
Cabinet des Modes ou les Modes Nouvelles, 15 Septembre 1786.

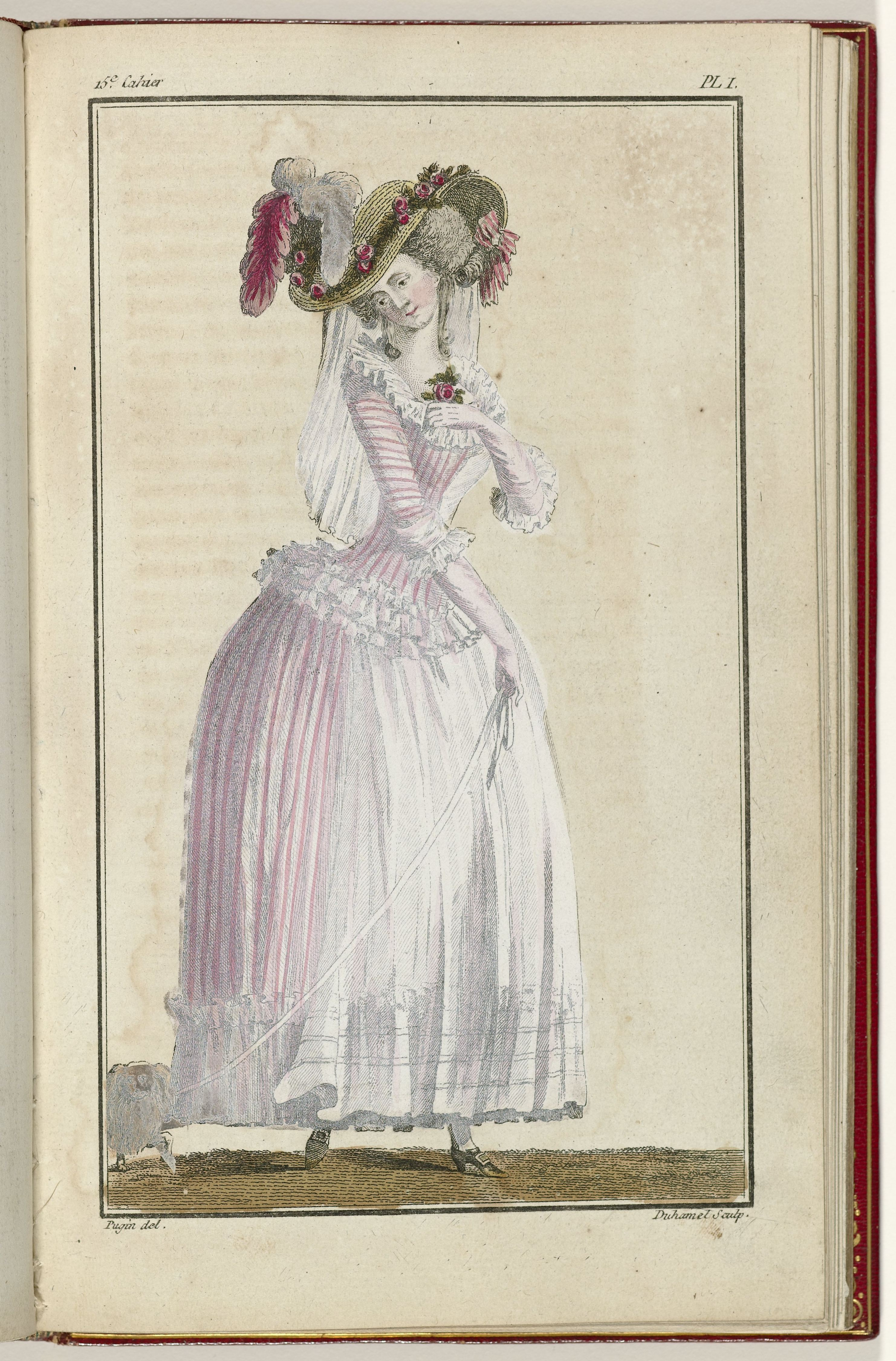
Cabinet des Modes ou les Modes Nouvelles, 15 Juin 1786, pl. I, BI-1959-529-28

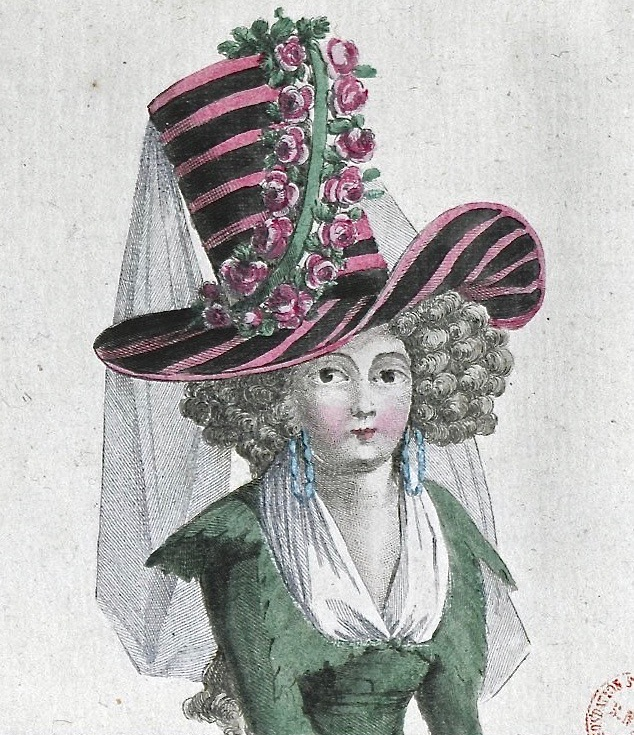
Magasin des modes nouvelles françaises (-1...) bpt6k1025111d

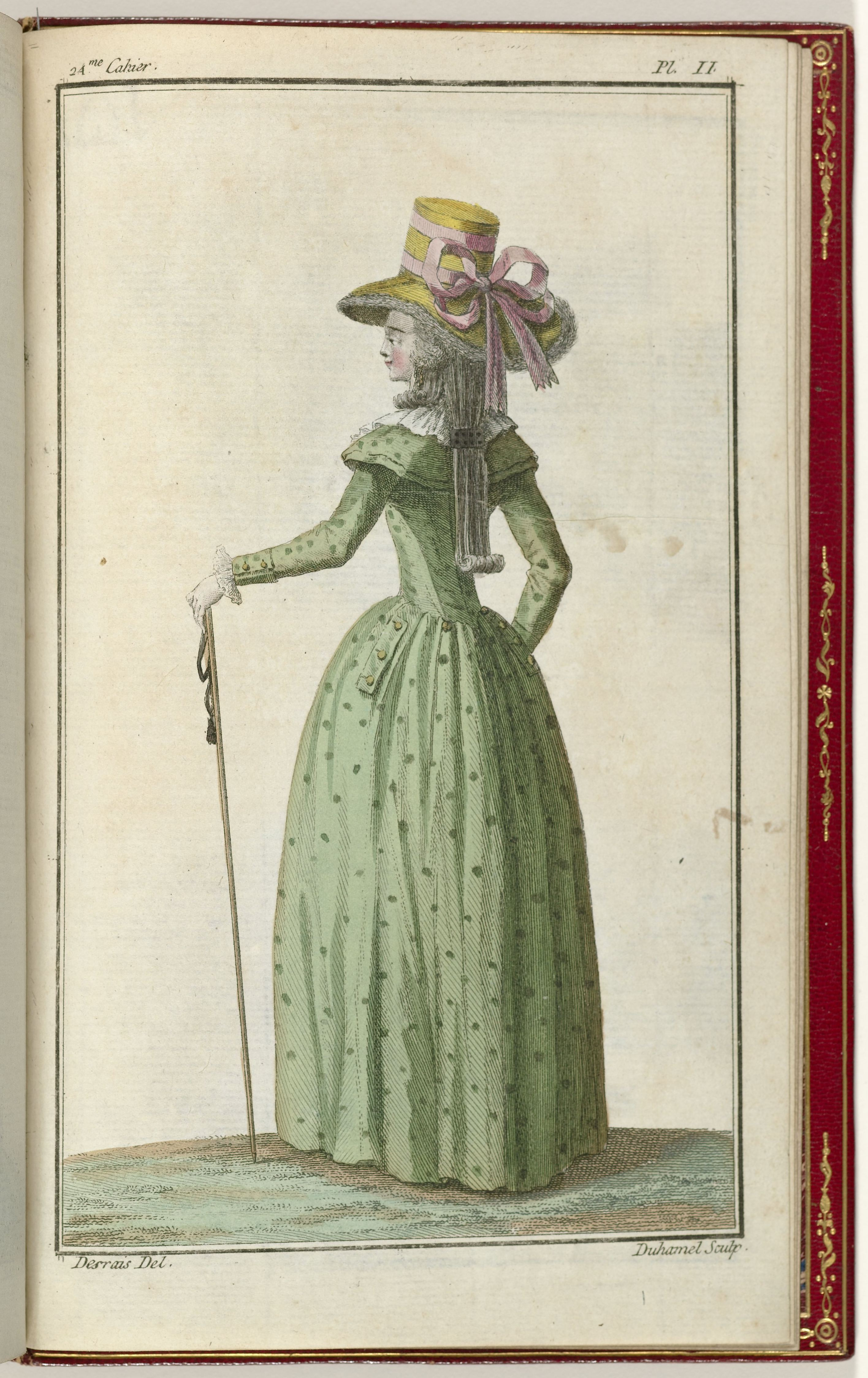
Cabinet des Modes ou les Modes Nouvelles, 1 Novembre 1786, pl. II, BI-1959-529-55
