= Galerie des Modes et Costumes Français =

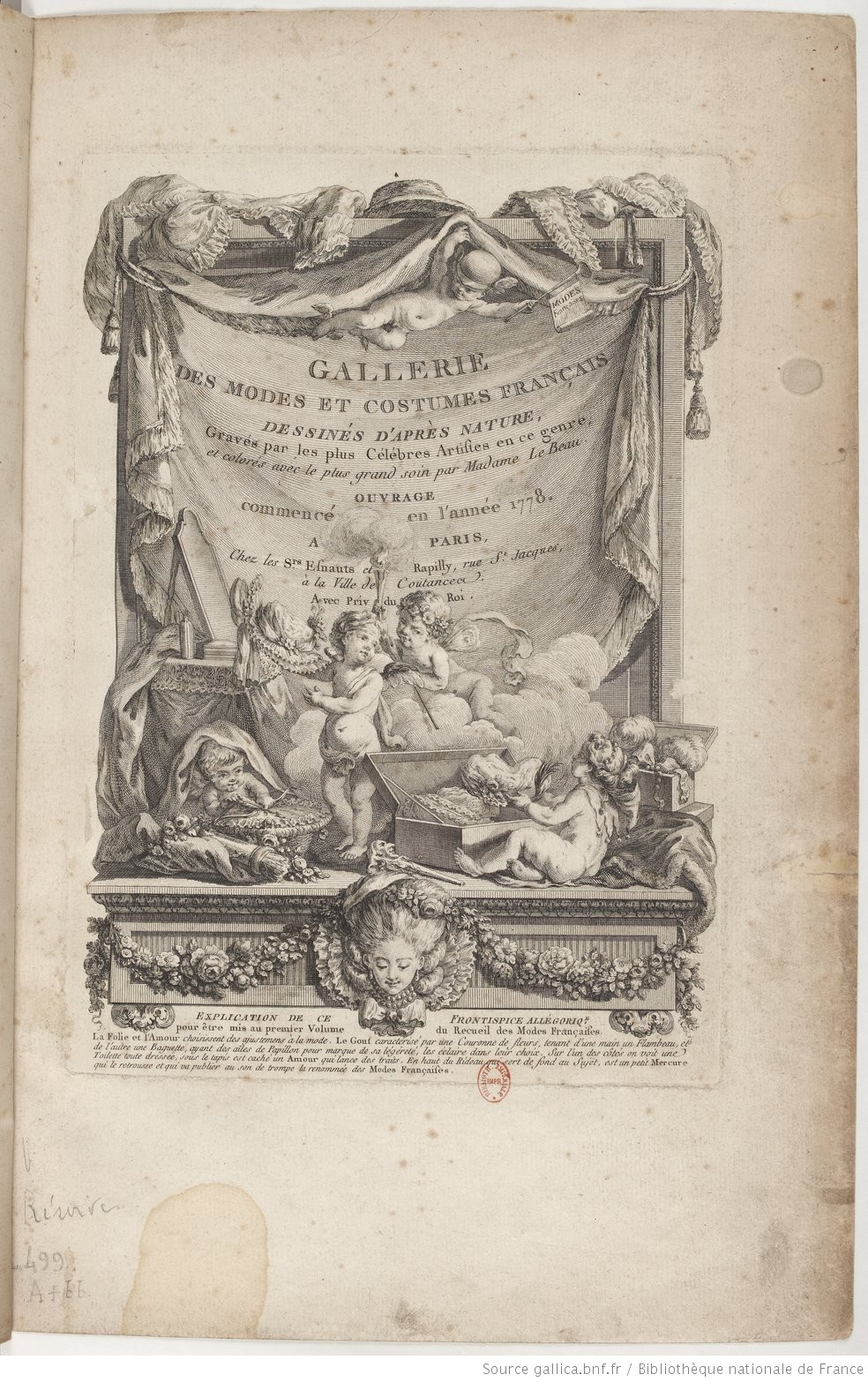
- Frontispiece for the first collected volume of Galerie des Modes et Costumes Français (1779).
- Country: France
- Language: French
- Publisher: Esnault et Rapilly
- Published: 1778-1787

Galerie des Modes et Costumes Français is a series of fashion and costume plates that was distributed in Paris from 1778 to 1787, during the reign of King Louis XVI of France and Marie Antoinette. The first collected volume, which was produced in 1779, had a title page which bore an allegorical illustration as well as the full title of the collection: Gallerie des modes et des costumes français dessinés d'après nature, Gravés par le plus Célèbres Artistes en ce genre, et colorés avec le plus grand soin par Madame Le Beau. Ouvrage commence en l'année 1778. A Paris, chez le Srs Esnauts et Rapilly rue St. Jacques à la Ville de coutances. Avec priv. Du Roi (Gallery of French fashions and costumes, drawn from life, engraved by the most celebrated artists in this medium, and hand-colored with the greatest care by Madame Le Beau;publication begun in 1778. Paris, Messrs. Esnauts and Rapilly, rue Satin-Jacques, at the sign of the City of Countances. Licensed by the King). Importantly, this lengthier epithet indicates that the engravings of the Galerie (or Gallerie, according to eighteenth-century spelling) were created "d'après nature," or "after nature," meaning that they were intended to represent what was actually worn in the streets of Paris during the latter part of the eighteenth century.

Although they vary in their presentation, the majority of images included in this series are tableaux vivants in which Parisians from various walks of life flaunt their quotidian fashions. These plates were completed by a group of prominent, eighteenth-century designers and engravers and are accompanied by descriptive text. Although no private or public collection possesses a complete edition of the Galerie, the series is widely recognized for its high aesthetic value as well as its innovation within the overarching field of the fashion plate. René Colas, who compiled the major reference work Bibliographie générale du costume et de la mode (1933), calls it "the most beautiful collection in existence on the fashions of the eighteenth century."

== History ==
=== Background ===
Galerie des modes was conceived during the final decades of the 1700s, a period when France was at the forefront of fashion innovation. To quote the historian James Laver, at this time "fashionable clothes...meant French clothes." This supreme influence was undoubtedly strengthened by Queen Marie Antoinette as well as figures such as Rose Bertin (her dressmaker) and Monsieur Léonard Autié (her hairdresser) who were responsible for designing her iconic courtly wardrobe. Beginning in the 1770s (the decade during which Antoinette both married future king Louis-Auguste and assumed the title Queen of France and Navarre), women's dress came to exhibit greater variation than ever before; the fashion plate emerged under these conditions, as if to disseminate each budding trend. The queen's fashion style was publicized by the women's magazine Journal des Dames.

Despite the prominence of eighteenth-century French style, the first true fashion plates were produced for The Lady's Magazine, a British publication established in 1770. Prior to this date, the majority of prints published in France, such as Jean Dieu de Saint-Jean's engravings of male and female costume at the Court of Louis XIV, were "costume plates," which depicted clothes "after the event." Information concerning the latest fashion was difficult to come by, so difficult, in fact, that the aforementioned Rose Bertin would travel the Continent each year in an enormous berline carriage containing dolls dressed in the most up-to-date modes de Paris. Ostensibly rendered "after nature", according to the everyday observations of prominent contemporary artists, the engravings of the Galerie thus responded to a growing demand for fashion news as well as a general gap in the market of French prints.

=== Publication ===
The innovative Galerie des modes is the most expansive and perhaps the best known project of the print merchants Jacques Esnauts (or Esnault) and Michel Rapilly. Both of these men hailed from the region of Normandy (Esnauts came from Magny-le-Désert, and Rapilly came from Pirou), and the name of their publishing house, Ville de Coutances, reflects these common origins. Located on the rue Saint-Jacques, this maison was established on July 6, 1773 following their brief stint at the nearby La Croix de Lorraine, where they had worked about three years earlier. Here the editors primarily published portraits of both historical and contemporary subjects; they began issuing the Galerie after obtaining a printing privilege on July 29, 1778 and continued to do so until 1787.

Perhaps in an effort to emulate the prints of The Lady's Magazine, various engravers, hairdressers, and booksellers had, at this time, published a number of small almanacs on contemporary fashion. In formulating their Galerie, Esnauts and Rapilly combined the subjects of these early volumes (which primarily focused on hairstyles) with the high quality of engraving found in series by the prolific Moreau le Jeune, such as Suite d'estampes pour servir à l'Histoire des Moeurs et du Costume. The resulting prints were distributed at random intervals, usually in sets (cahiers) of six, for the price of 36 livres (around 14 euro's in today's currency). Although many historians differ on the exact number of plates issued throughout publication, it is clear that over 400 engravings were issued in what was probably more than 70 portfolios. The first cahiers focused solely on hairstyles (coiffures) However, from the seventh cahier onwards, the series began to represent full outfits, illustrated from head-to-toe. The first collected volume of the Galerie (published in 1779) included 96 plates which came from the initial 16 portfolios of the series and was preceded by a forty-page descriptive introduction written by the lawyer G.François-Roger Molé.

== Production ==
=== The Artists ===
The Galerie implicated the work of numerous prominent visual artists. In fact, the full title of the series, which was displayed in the epigraph of the collected 1779 volume, vaunts that its illustrations were drawn by "the most celebrated artists ("les plus célebres artistes") of the period, all of which had achieved the highest level of mastery in their medium. Recognized as some of the best fashion illustrators of their time, the designers tied to the project included Pierre Thomas Le Clerc (or Leclére), Claude Louis Desrais, François Louis Joseph Watteau (the grandnephew of Antoine Watteau), Augustin de Saint-Aubin, and Jean-Baptiste Martin. Claude-Ferdinand Gaillard, Jean-Baptiste Patas, Pierre Andrien Le Beau, Nicolas Dupin, his son Jean Pierre Julien, Etienne Claude Voysard, Jean Alexandre Aveline, Pélissier, Jacques Le Roy, J.P. Vossinik (or Wossinik), and Jean-François Janinet appear to have been the enlisted engravers. In certain cases, the draftsman Martin seems to have acted as both the designer and engraver. To quote Peter McNeil and Sanda Miller's Fashion Writing and Criticism: History, Theory, Practice, the compositions completed by each one of these artists demonstrate "the strong influence of figurative painting in their creation."

Although there exist no contracts that officially confirm the involvement of these artists, their respective contributions are marked by signatures. With the exception of the first six notebooks (which are not signed) as well as a few other plates which seem to have been released later in publication, the names of the designer and the engraver are found below each image included in the Galerie, often with variations in spelling. The name of the designer normally appears at the lower right of each plate, alongside the words "Dessiné par" or "del." ("delineavit"). The name of the engraver, meanwhile, is typically found on the lower right beside the terms "Gravé par" (or "Gravée par), "sc." or "sculp." ("sculpsit"). In certain rarer cases, the designer's name is accompanied by the word "inv." ("invenit"), meaning "invented it" or "devised it." This notation can often be viewed, for example, alongside the signature of Jean-Baptiste Martin and seems to have been used for the first time in the twenty-fourth cahier of the series.

=== The Plates ===
The prints of the Galerie were rendered through a process commonly implemented in fashion plate production. The designers provided the drawings for the series, and the engravers accordingly translated their creations into prints (in this case etchings, or line engravings). These images would then be tinted by hand either prior to distribution (presumably by Madame Le Beau) or after distribution by a "home hobbyist". The prints, for this reason, were sold both in color and in black and white.

Plates from the Galerie can be divided into essentially five categories of composition. Among suites depicting coiffures, three different formate emerge, all of which feature isolated figures illustrated from the shoulders up. In the first six cahiers of the Galerie, the designer (whose identity is not confirmed) has rendered four figures that appear in distinct rectangular quadrants. In later four-figure, coiffure-oriented plates, the subjects are distinguished by oval-shaped frames. Particularly in plates depicting more than four hairstyles (some contain twelve or sixteen), figures are separated by individual rectangles as well as overlaid elliptical frames.

Among suites depicting entire outfits ("habillemens à la mode"), there emerge essentially two different compositions. In most cases, one to three full-length figures appear in what is supposed to be a general, quotidian scene. Designed to showcase the fashions worn by these characters (rather than any complex narrative action), the backgrounds of these plates contain few elements, if any at all. Though figures are sometimes drawn in a specific setting, such as a garden, patio, or dressing room, they are depicted, perhaps more often, in a nondescript indoor or outdoor space with a mostly blank background. In certain later prints, figures are drawn individually, in frames rendered at the center of the composition on a rather small scale. This inner pictorial space is surrounded by garments that, relative to the depicted figure, appear larger than life. In some cases, these accoutrements are labeled with numbers corresponding to captions at the bottom of the plate.

Captions, indeed, are found on practically every print included in the Galerie. On plates with full-outfit compositions, text is printed directly below each image andusually above some variation of the inscription, "A Paris chez Esnauts et Rapilly rue St Jacques, à la Ville de Countances. Avec Priv du Roi (or A.P.D.R.)," which gives readers general information about publication. On certain plates devoted to coiffures, captions appear in the space of the illustrated figures. Though always descriptive in nature, the content of these captions varies from plate to plate. In some cases, the text simply focuses on the intricacies of the represented fashions. However, in others, it gives a sense of narrative and highlights the identity of the depicted character. Throughout the series, the length of these captions also has a tendency to fluctuate.

=== The Subjects ===
In the late eighteenth century the courtly presence of Marie Antoinette was, as mentioned, absolutely instrumental to augmenting France's influence on the world of fashion at large. The subjects of the Galerie, however, are by no means relegated to "ladies of the highest rank." In addition to noblewomen, the series represents members of the bourgeoisie and the serving class. (To quote the exhibition catalogue, New for Now: The Origin of Fashion Magazines, published by the Rijksmuseum, "the costumier and the housemaid also appear" in certain plates) Though outnumbered by these other subjects, the series also devotes some of its prints to the fashions of men and children.

These drawings were touted as "designs after nature" ("dessinés d'après nature"), reflecting the fact that the designers who contributed to the series would draw from life. Their compositions were based on the most fashionable garments and hairstyles of period, which they would often observe with their own eyes at popular locales, such as parks, theaters, and even the ateliers of fashionable dressmakers and tailors. Breaking ever so slightly from this mold, several plates found within the series also depict costumes made for eighteenth-century productions of theater and ballet, many of which were designed by P.N Sarrazin who is listed in various captions as the "'Costumier des Princes"" ("Costume designer of Princes").

== Impact ==
Galerie des Modes is a huge monument to the world of fashion. As highlighted in New for Now, the Galerie was circulated among a wide array of "fashion-conscious" audiences, both in France and abroad, and would ultimately go down in history as "the best and largest" fashion plate series of the eighteenth century. Among contemporary audiences, the Galerie is often regarded as the first illustrated fashion journal. However, the series actually cannot be defined as a true magazine, at least according to the modern definition of the term. The Cabinet des Modes ou les Modes Nouvelles, which was first launched in 1785 and, a year later, came to be called the Magazin des Modes Nouvelle Françaises et Anglaises, is recognized as the first real fashion magazine, for, in contrast to the sporadically distributed Galerie des Modes, it was issued regularly (every fortnight) and reproduced typographically, contained illustrations, and focused exclusively on fashion and lifestyle.

Today the original prints of Galerie are extremely rare, particularly in a comprehensively compiled form. Between 1911 and 1914, Paul Cornu and Emile Lévy published a reproduction of the series complete with hand-colored plates as well as text sourced from eighteenth-century periodicals and literature, though only 325 plates are accounted for. This rare edition can be read at a select number prominent research institutions, including Brooklyn Museum Library where one can also examine the 24-plate volume compiled and by Roger-Armand Weigert. The Frick Art Reference Library, the Brooklyn Museum, the Fashion Institute of Technology (FIT), the Museum of Fine Arts (MFA) in Boston, and the British Museum also house significant portions of the Galerie. None, however, possess a complete run of the series.

In collections that have not been arranged as coherent volumes such as those compiled by Cornu and Weigert, each cahier seems to be categorized by a letter (or letters) which label all of its corresponding prints, and each of these prints is marked with a number, indicating its place in the Galerie as a whole. The first plate of each cahier also tends to bear a categorical epithet, such as "9e Cahier des Costumes Français. 3e Suite d'Habillmens a la mode," that gives the reader basic information about its content. This system of notation, however, has not been completely resolved, for certain prints appear without numbers, letters, signatures, or, in some cases, all the above. As a result, many cahiers have been left with an incomplete appearance. Furthermore, prints that have been arranged in the customary suite of six do not always adhere to a consistent theme or compositional format. Regardless of their degree of accuracy and fidelity, the existence of these posthumous editions reflects the persistent importance of the Galerie in the worlds of fashion, costume, and, more generally, visual culture.

== Gallery ==
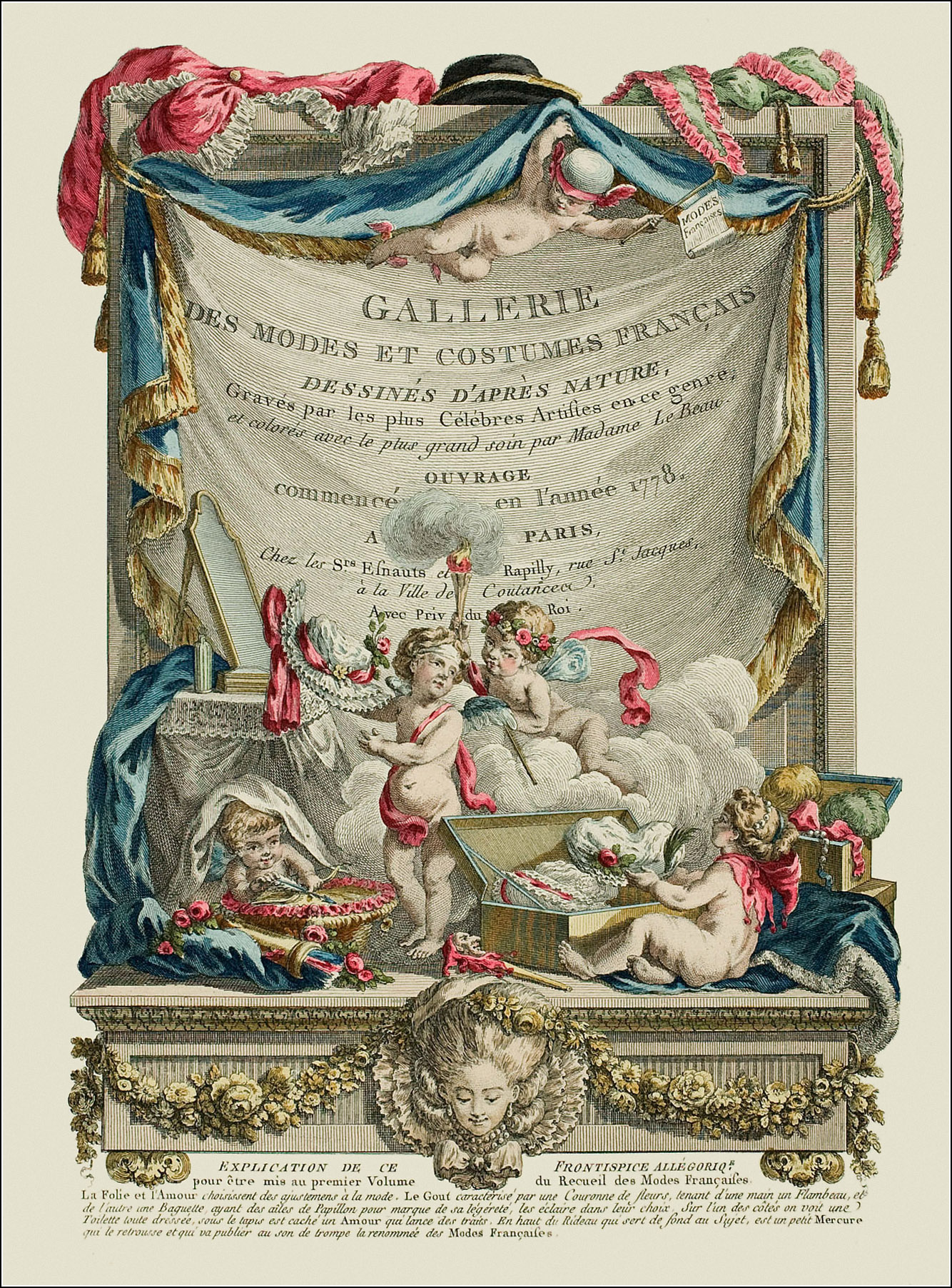

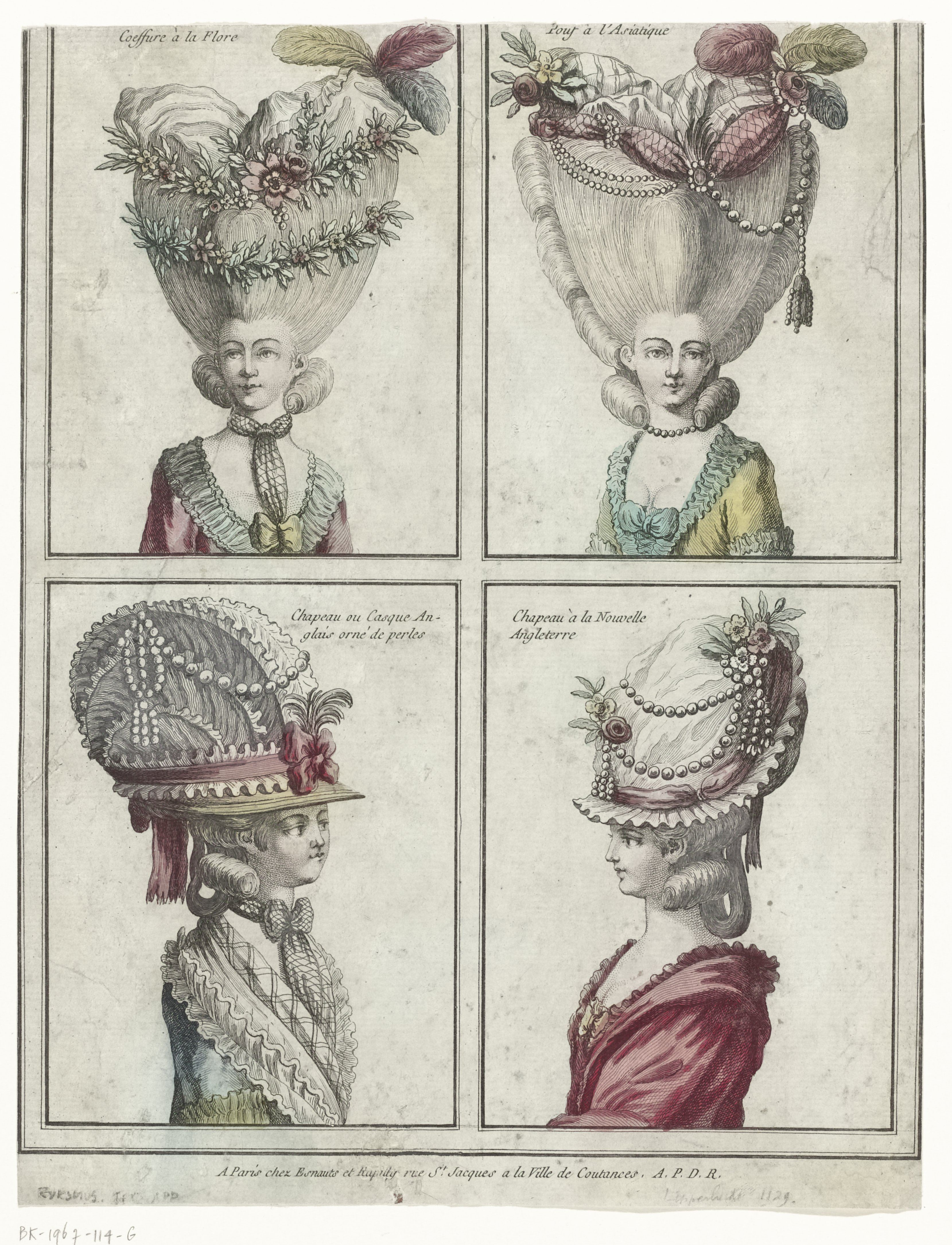

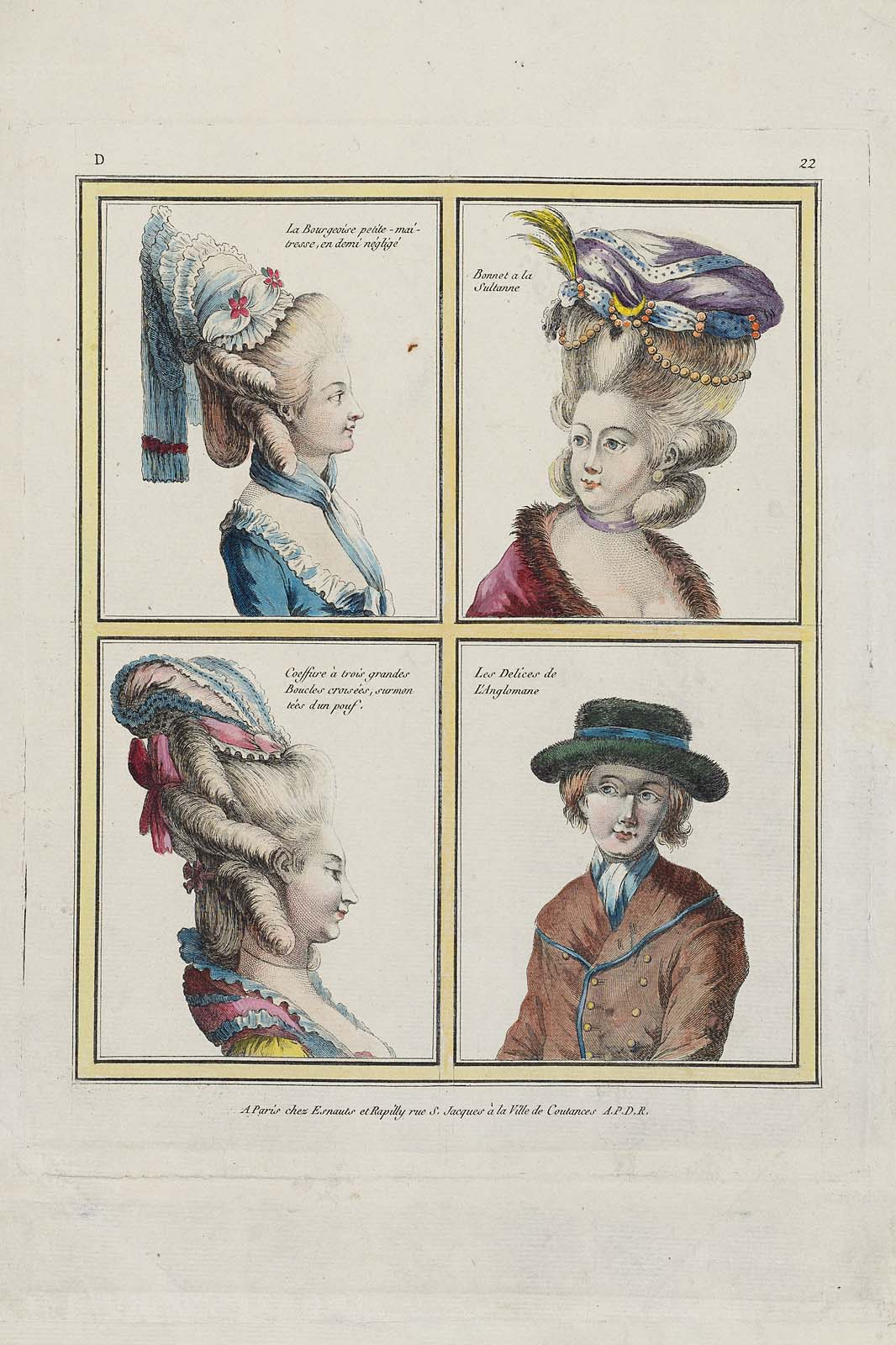

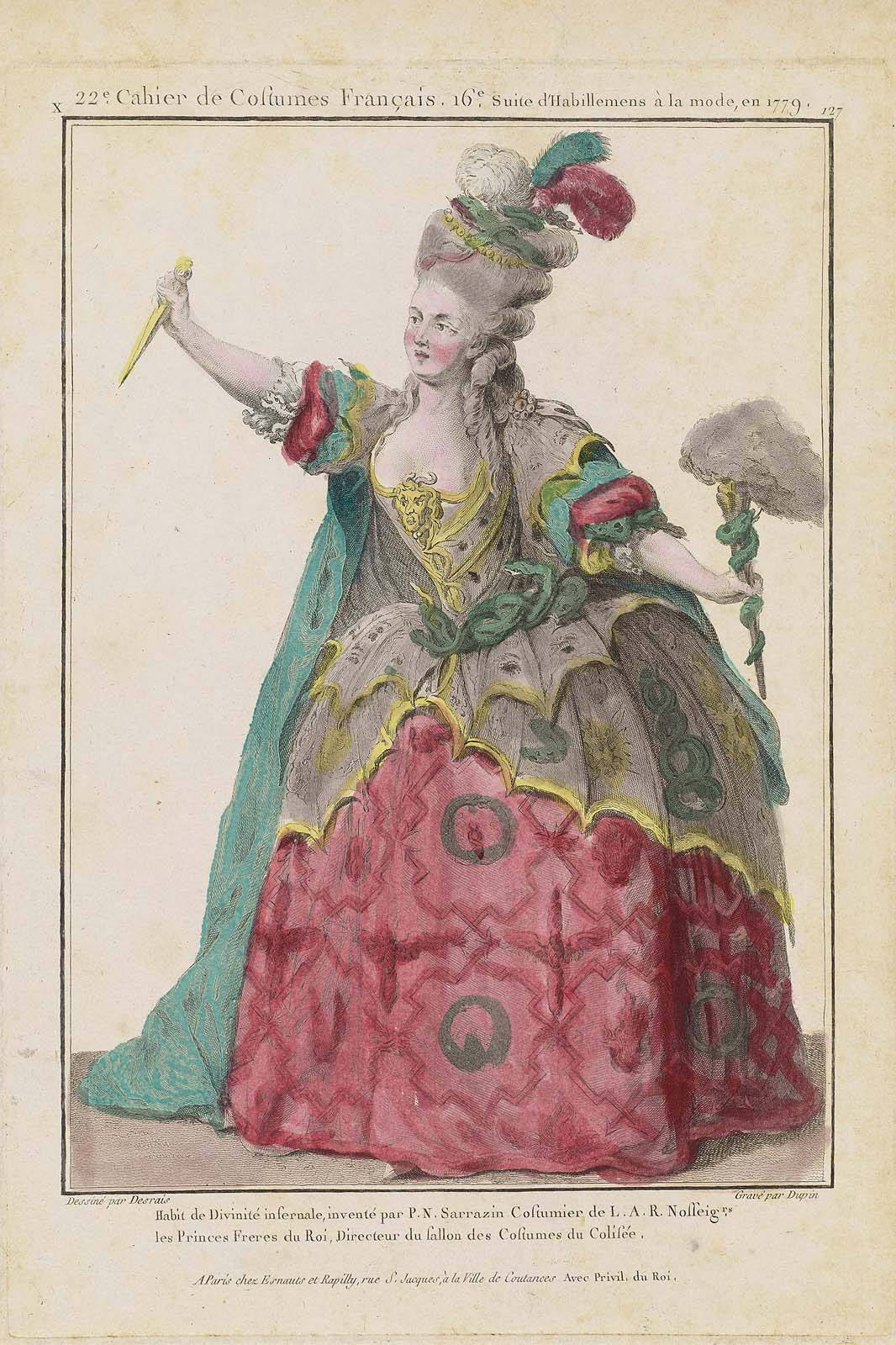

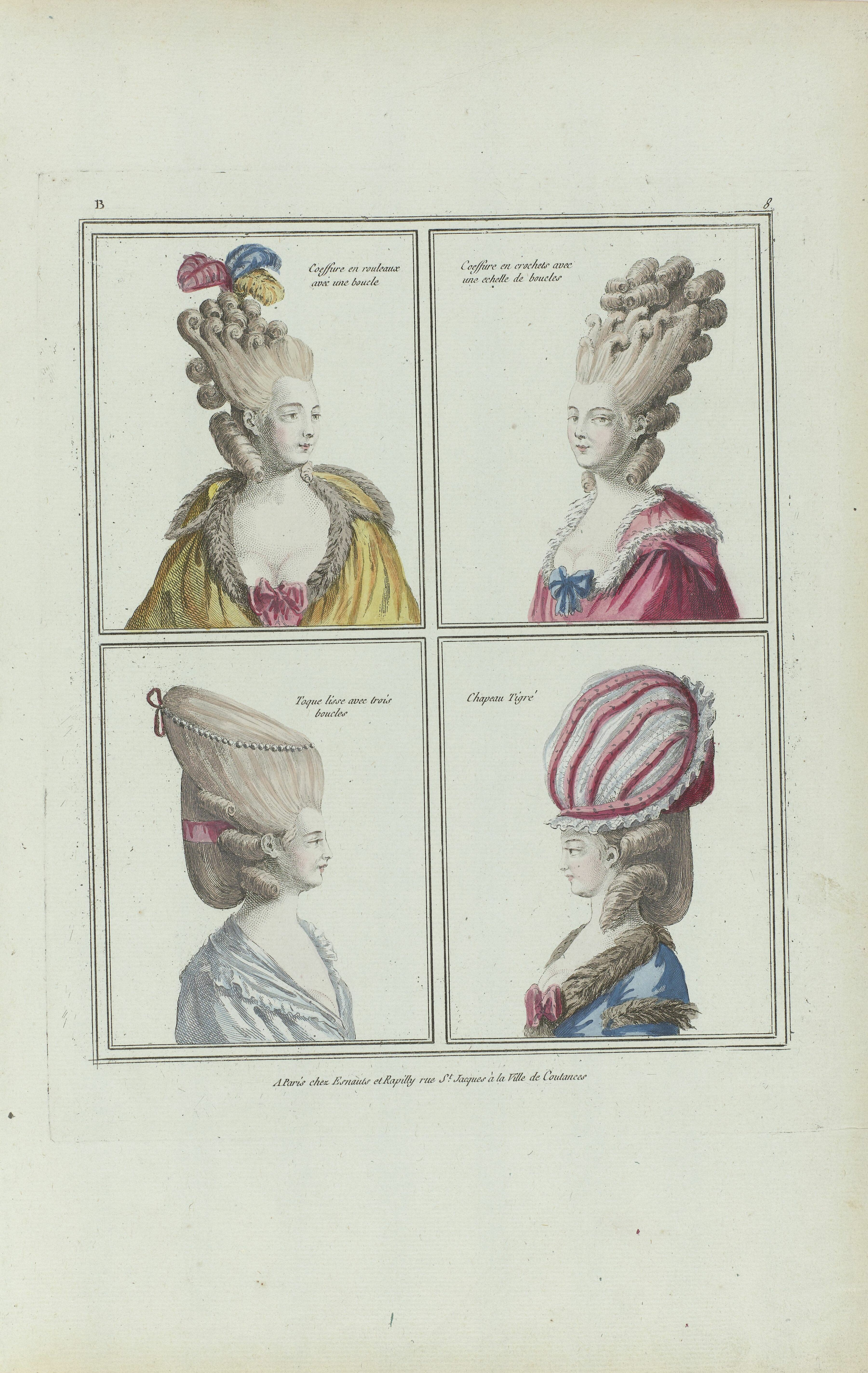

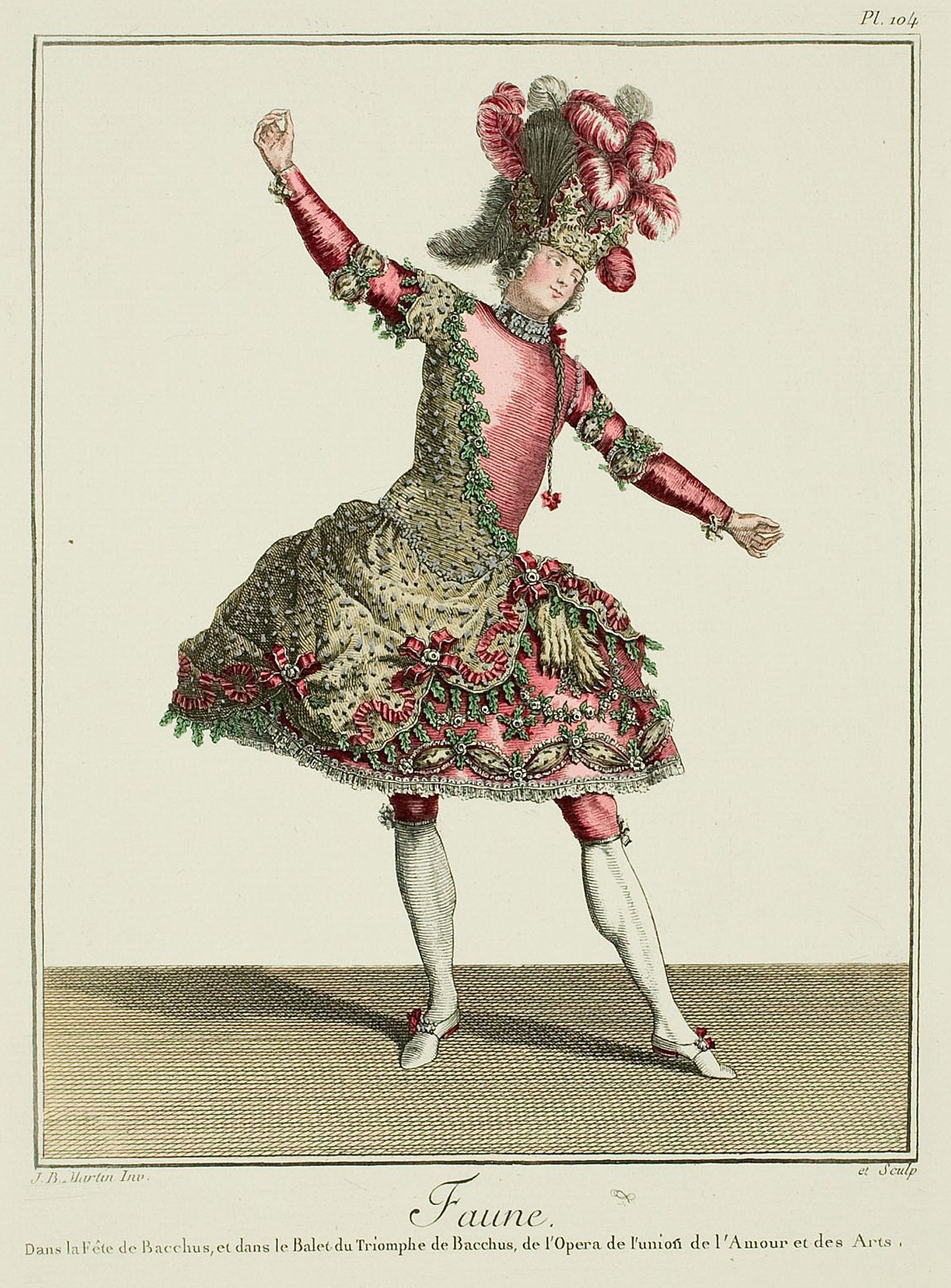

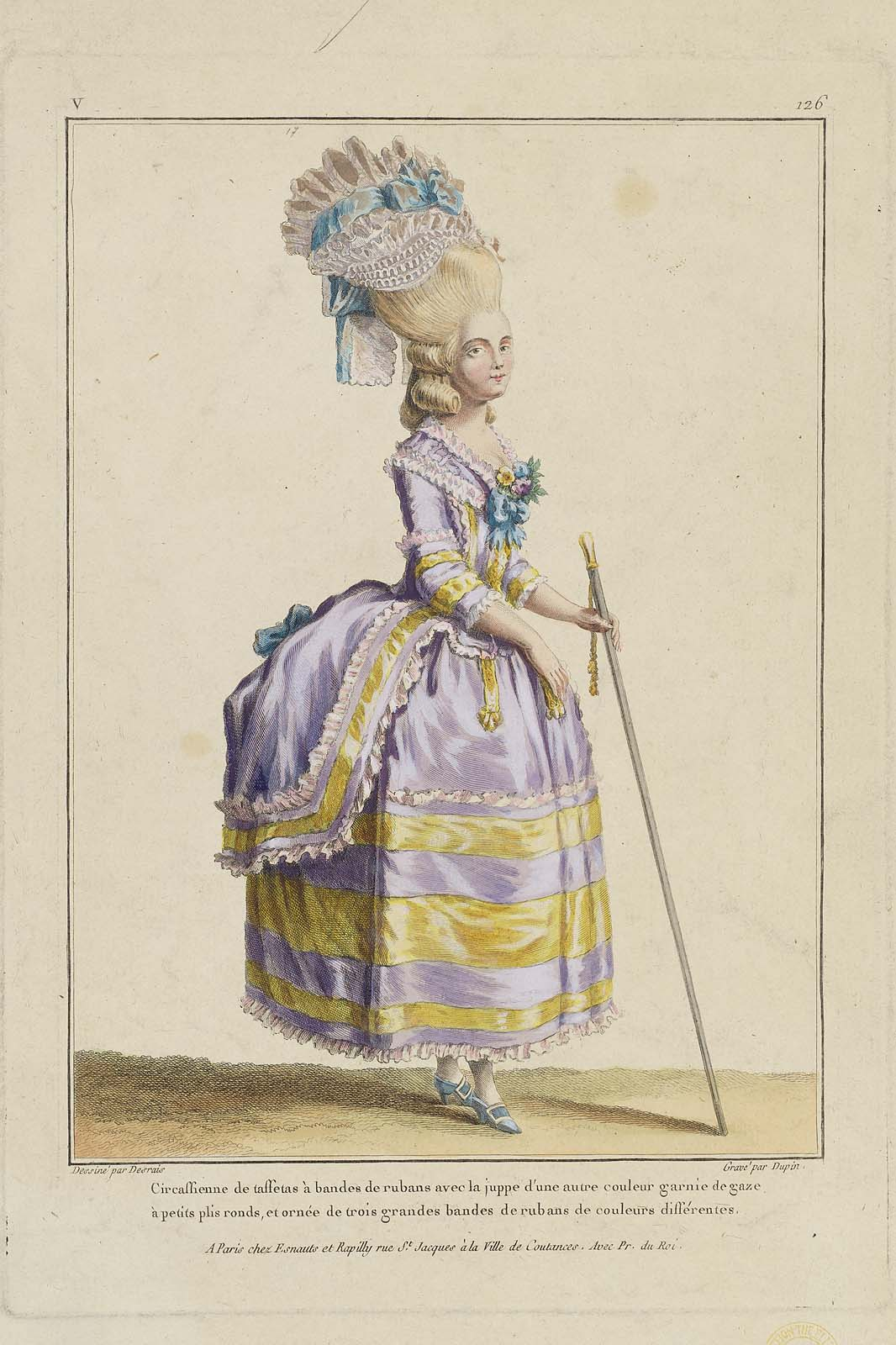

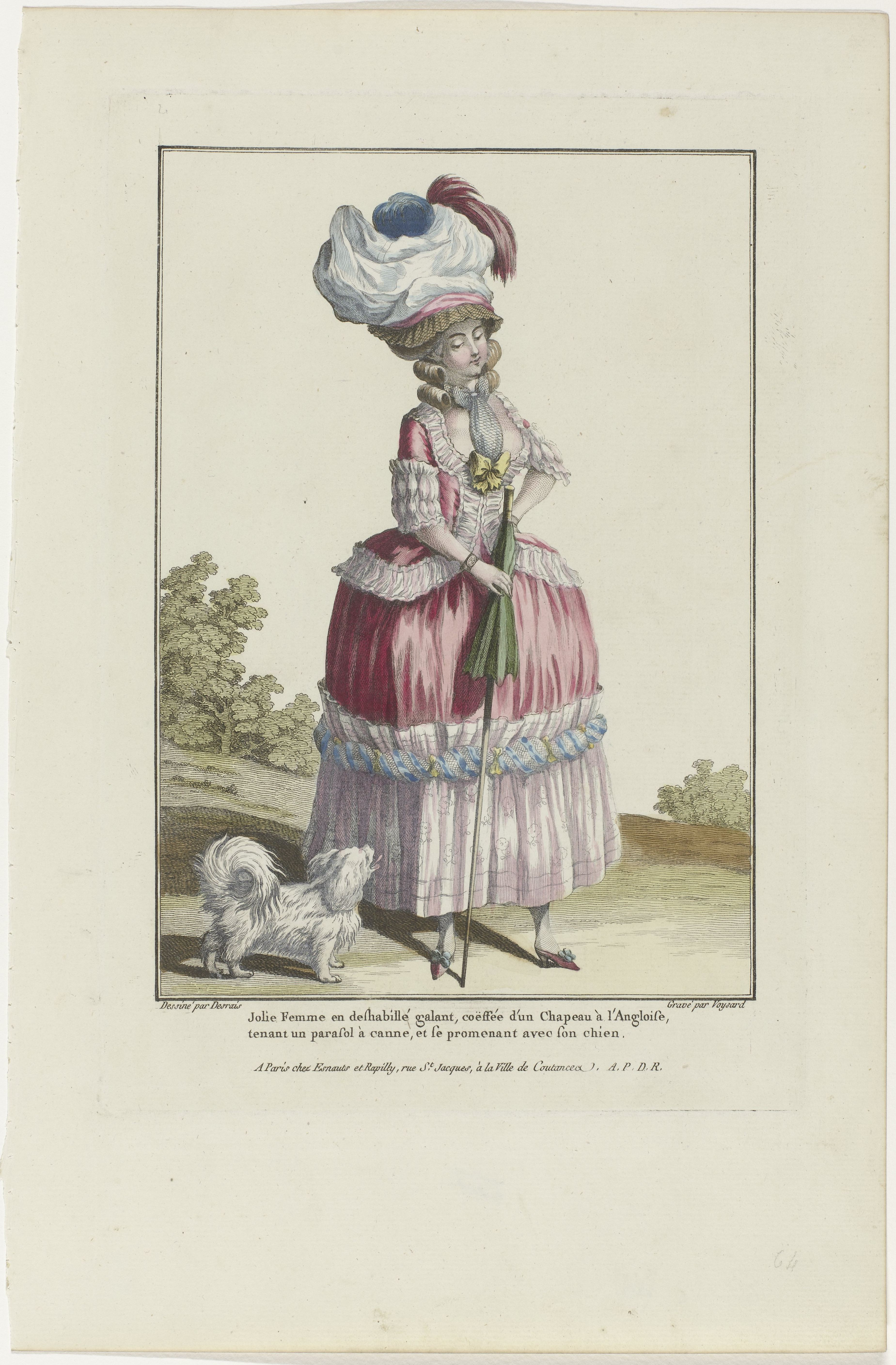

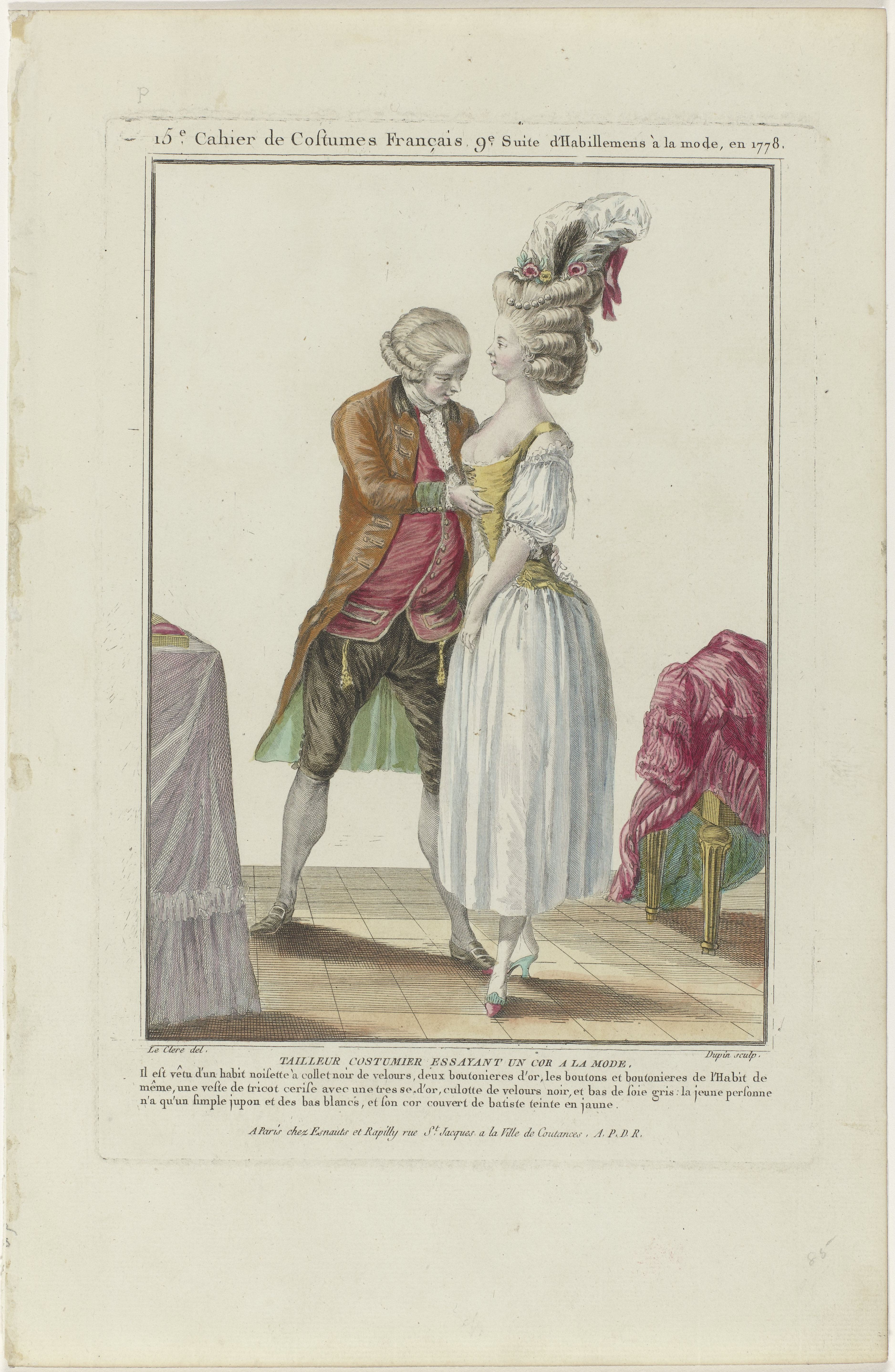

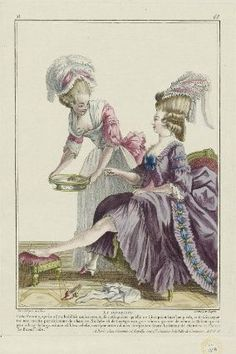

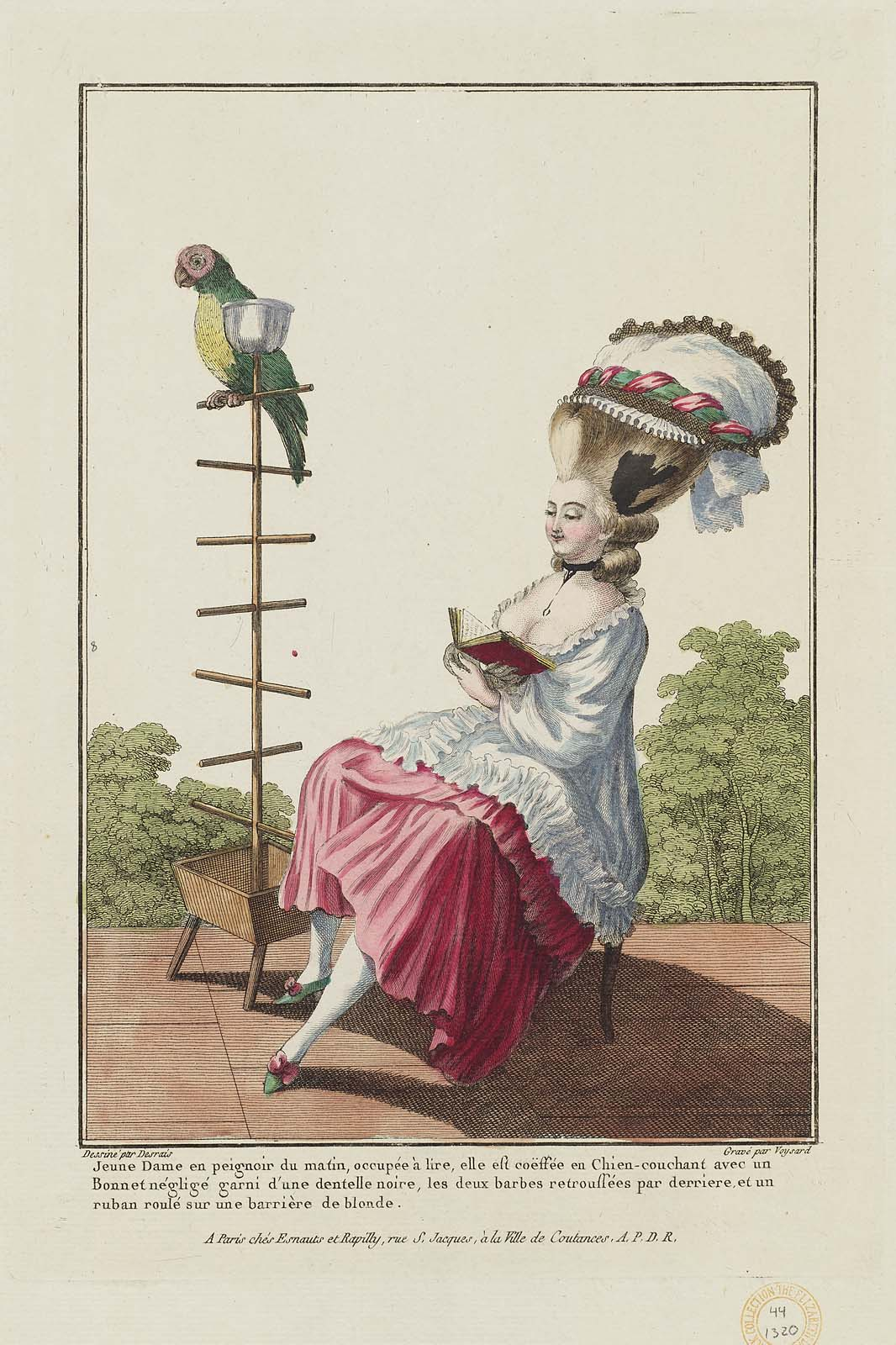

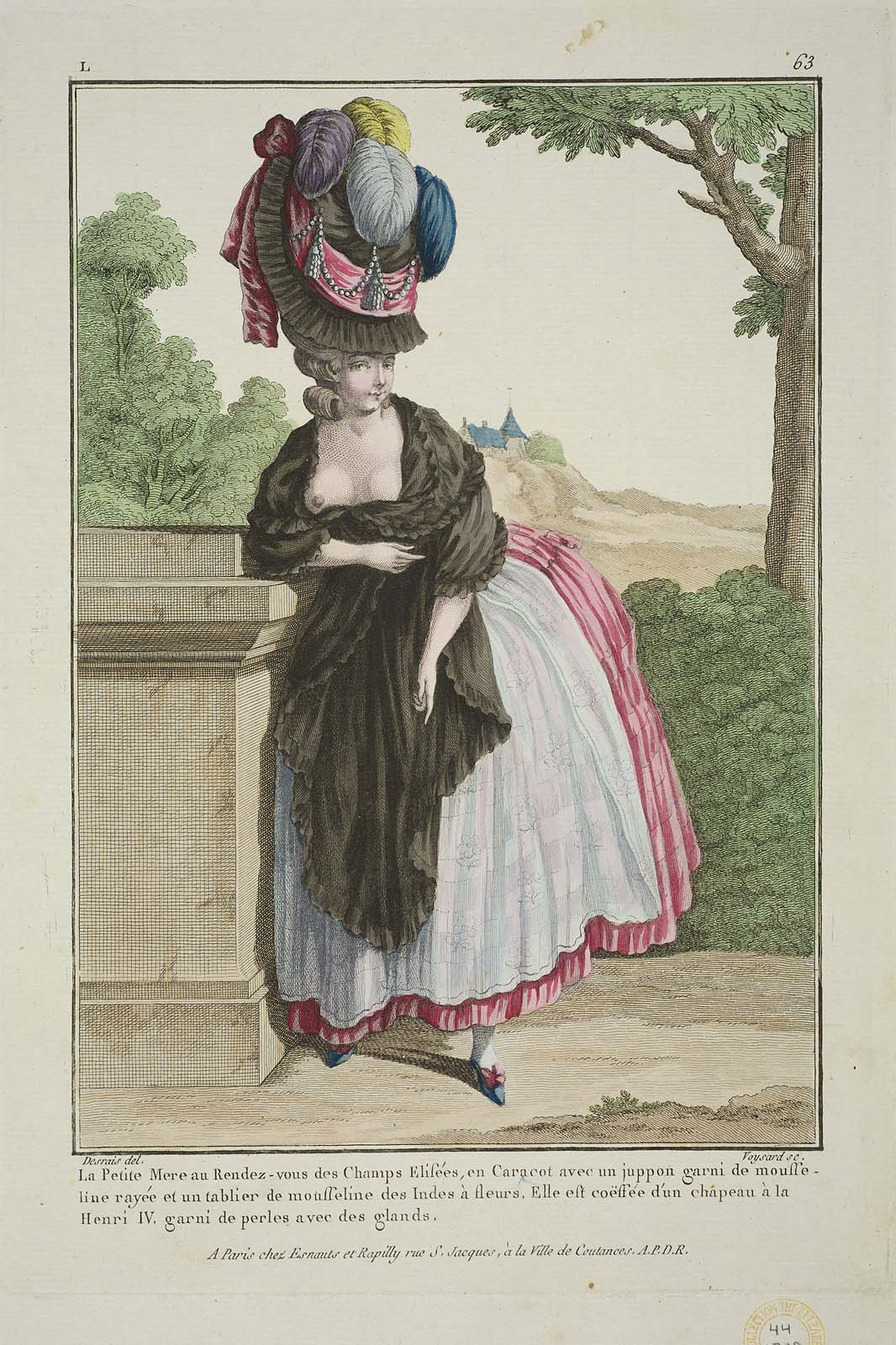

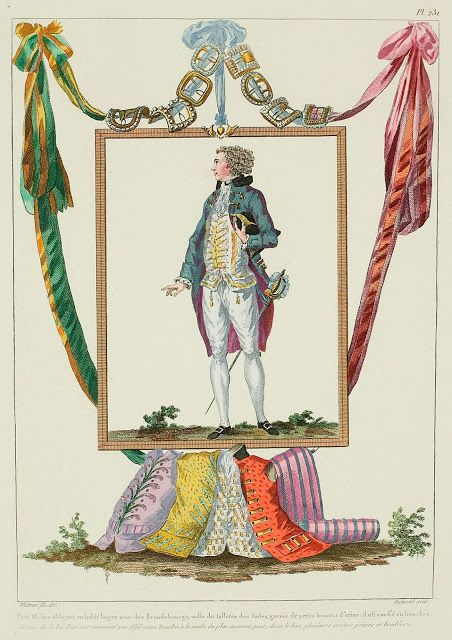

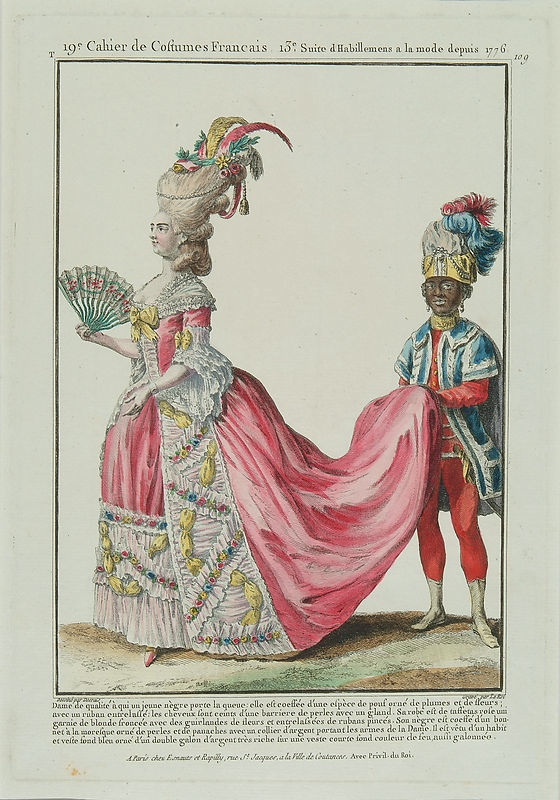

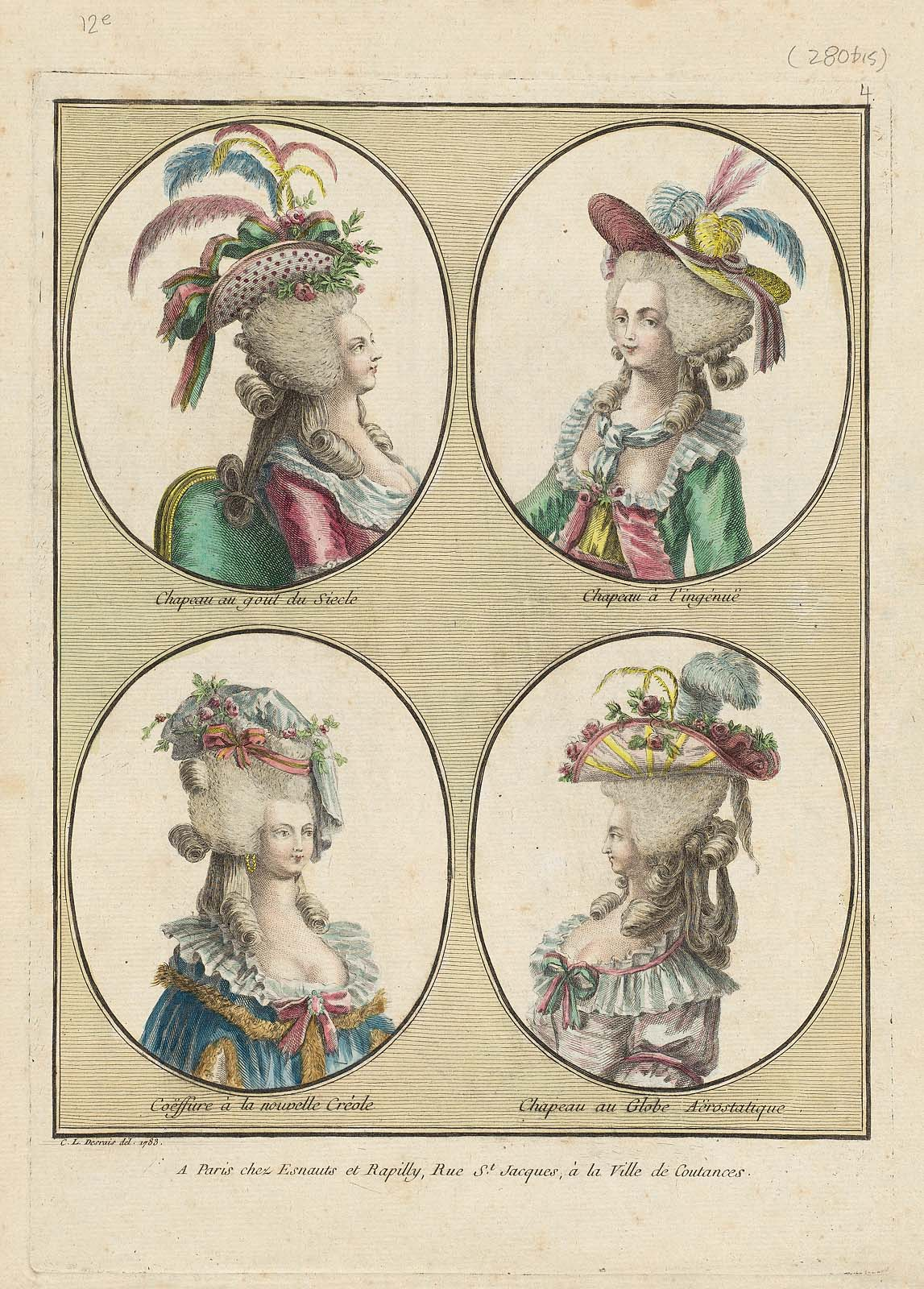

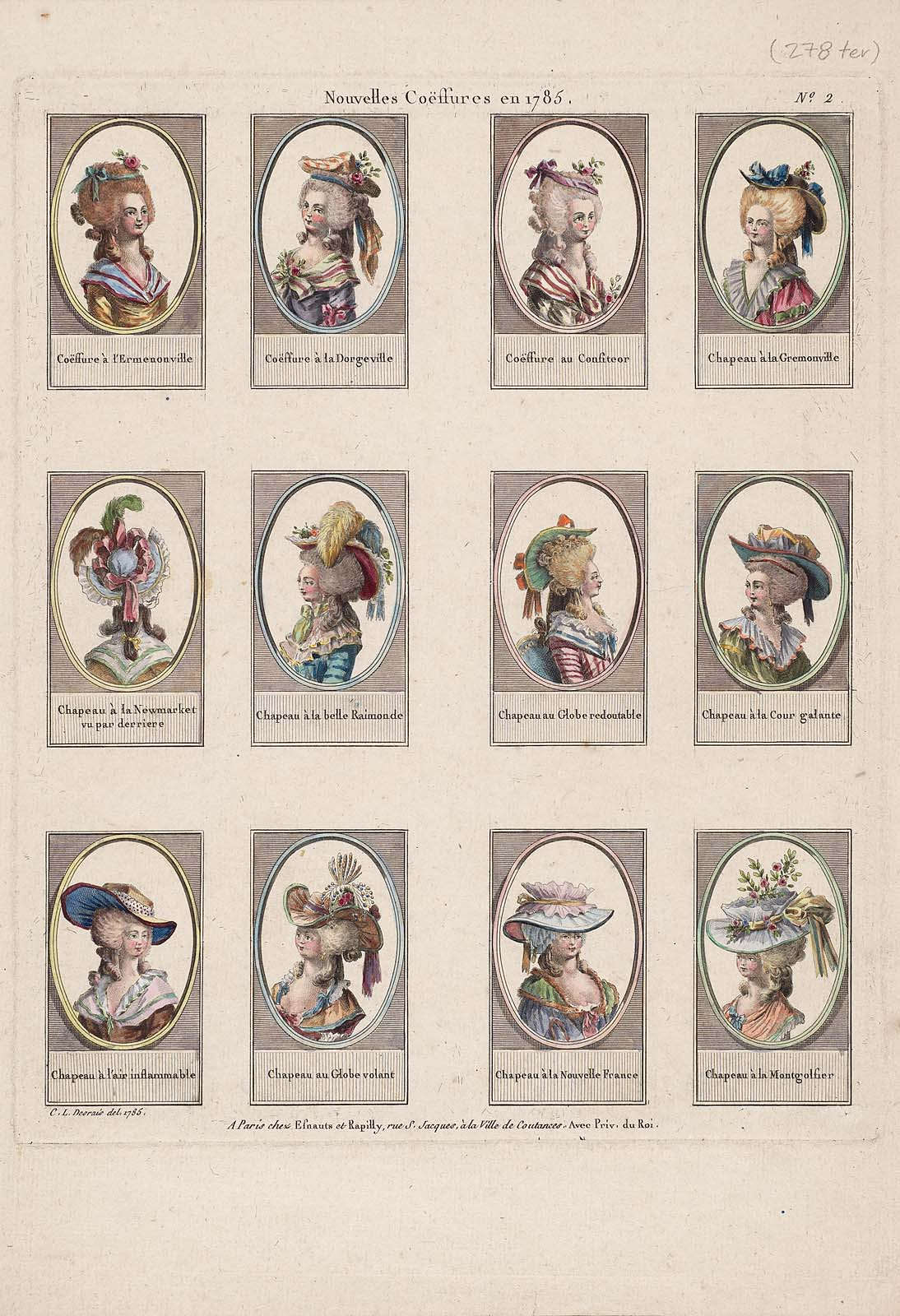

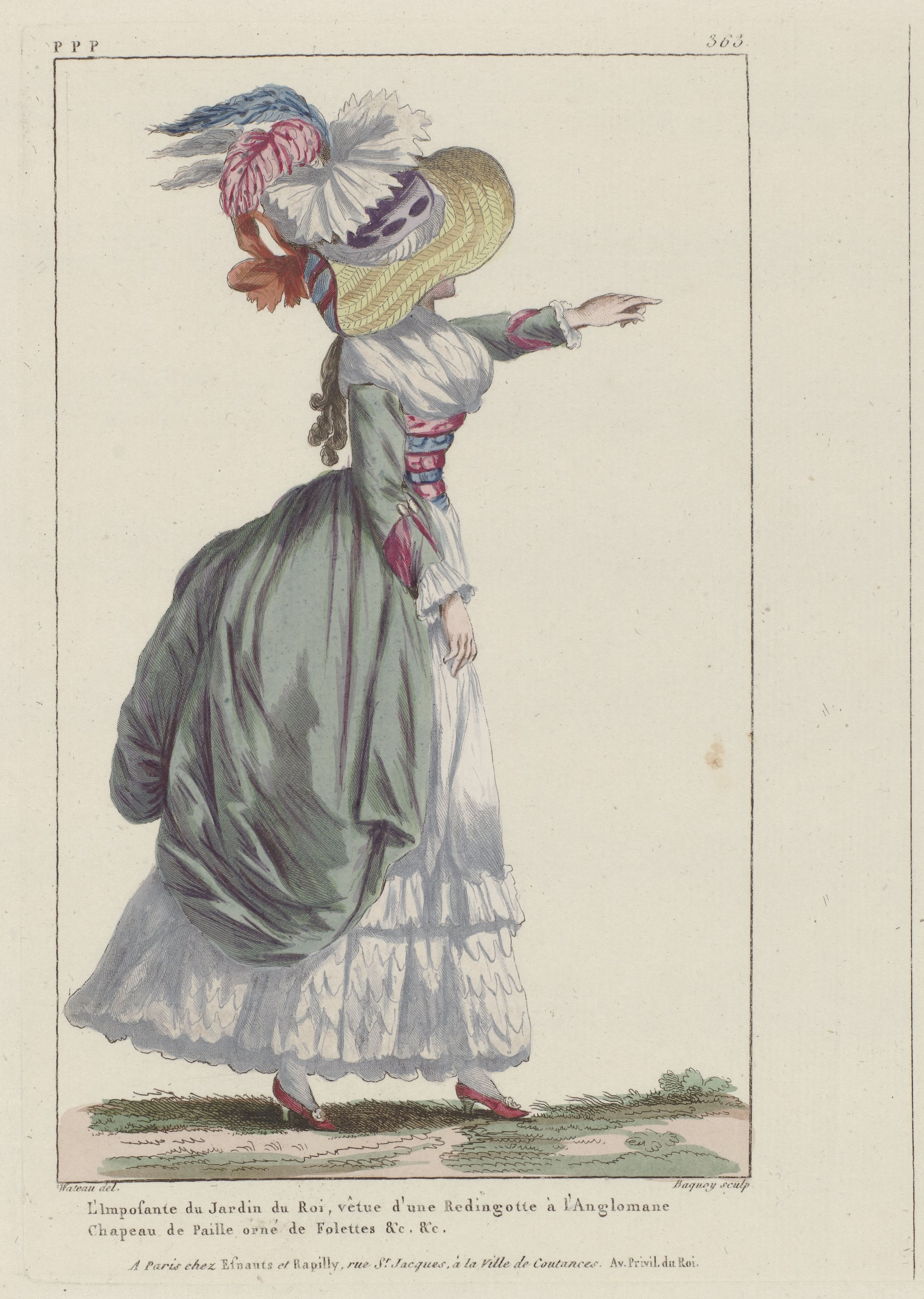

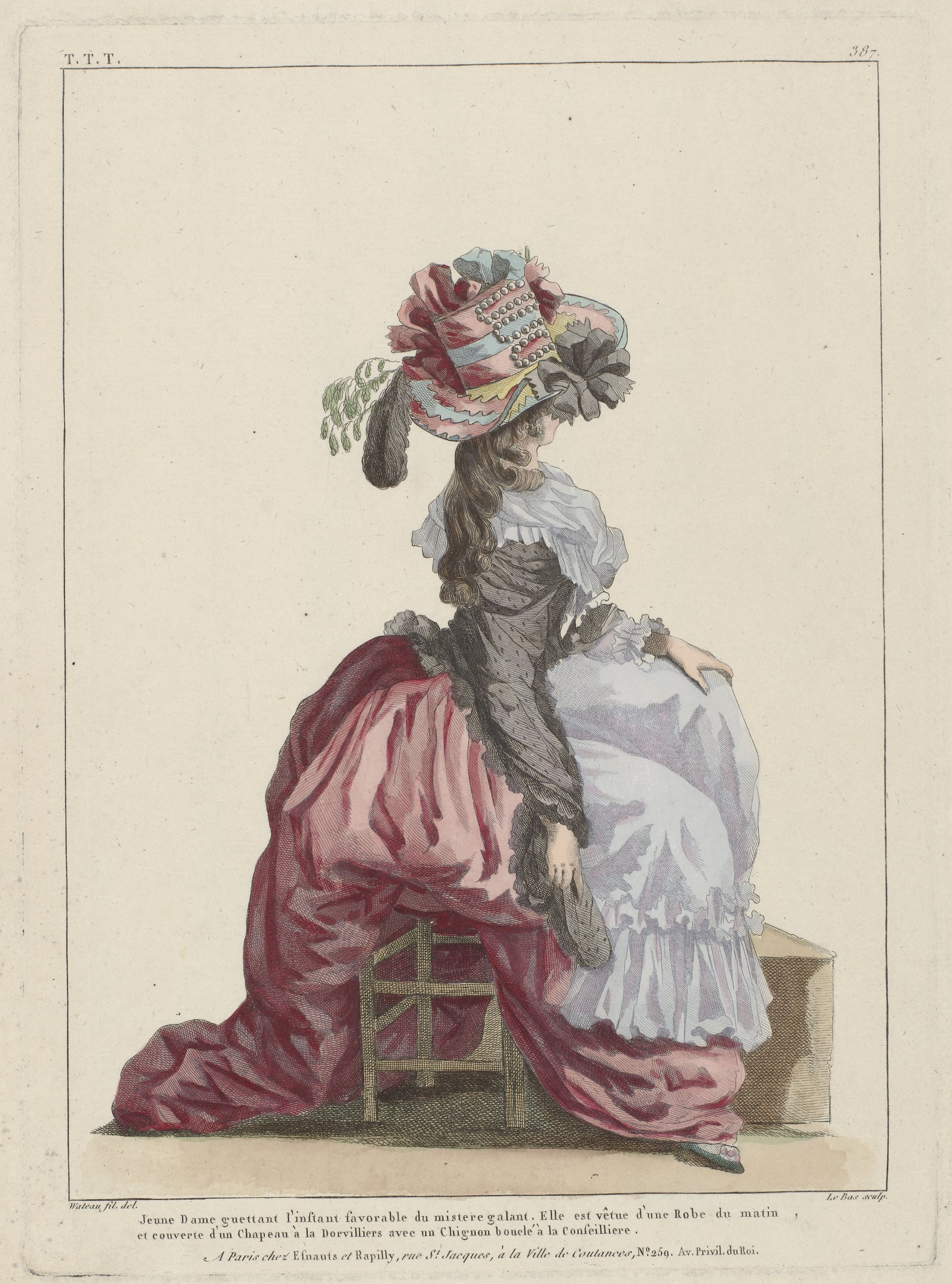

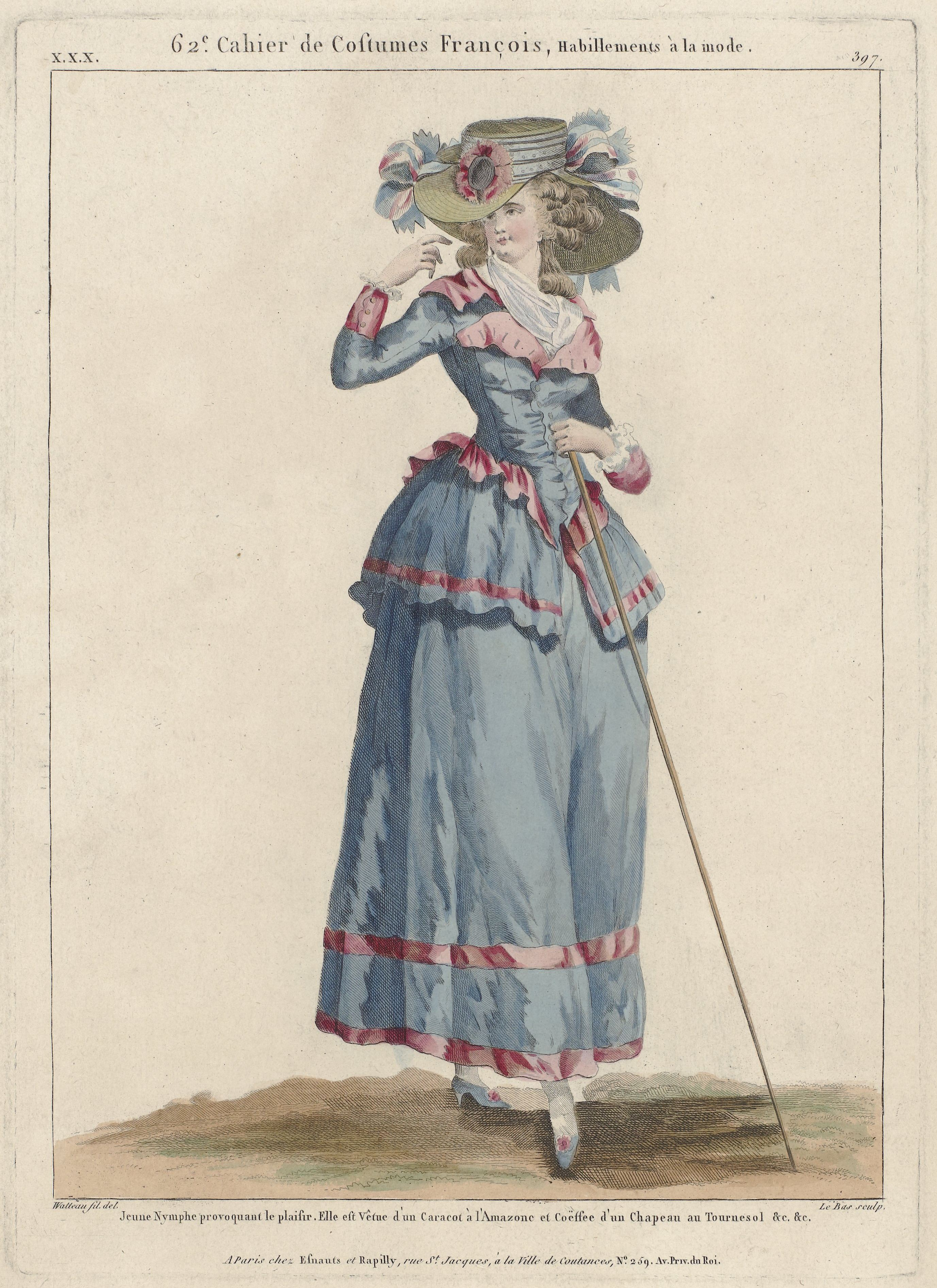
