= Mary Ann Bell =

British fashion merchant, fashion designer and fashion journalist

La Belle Assemblée

Mary Ann Bell, née Millard (1786–1835), was a British fashion merchant, dressmaker and fashion journalist. She promoted her designs in the British fashion industry of her day, particularly during the Napoleonic era, when less contact between Great Britain and France encouraged more local fashion innovation.

== Life and career ==
1836 plate from Bell's fashion magazine, World of Fashion and Continental Feuilletons.

Mary Ann Bell was the daughter-in-law of the publicist John Bell (1745–1831) and married in 1806 to John Browne Bell (1779–1855), founder of the News of the World.

Between circa 1810 to 1835, she had her own fashion shop in London, La Magazin des Modes.

She had an agent in Paris who informed her about the latest fashion, which she displayed in her shop in London twice a week. She claimed to have invented the Bandage Corset (1819), a corset specially designed for support during pregnancy, which was purchased by Princess Victoria of Saxe-Coburg-Saalfeld, giving her the right to refer to herself as 'Corset Maker to her Royal Highness, the Duchess of Kent'.

She was believed to participate as a fashion editor of the magazine La Belle Assemblée, which regularly promoted her designs as exclusive novelties and innovations in the 'World of Fashion and Continental Feuilletons', in which her ensembles were reproduced in engraved and coloured fashion plates. In 1830, she officially supported the boycott of French fashion, though in practice made use of them in her own shop.

== See also ==
- Ann Margaret Lanchester
