= Madame Lanchester =

Fashion designer

Margaret Ann Lanchester, known as Madame Lanchester (1784–1818), was a British fashion merchant and fashion designer. She has been described as a leading top name in British fashion during the regency era in the first decade of the 19th century.

== Life and career ==
Margaret Ann Lanchester was bron in Salford. She married John Lanchester and called herself Madame Lanchester.

She had a fashion shop in London between 1800 and 1810: in 1800-02 at 37 Sackville St., in 1803-05 at 17 New Bond St., and in 1806-10 at 59 St. James St. in London.

She made regular trips to Paris to study fashion. She published the exclusive fashion magazine Le Miroir de la Mode where she illustrated the contemporary fashion through her own dress models, which she sold in her shop in New Bond Street in London (in 1806 moved to St James's Street).

She was a leading figure within British regency fashion in the first decade of the 19th century, and referred to as 'The Bonaparte of her day' in the contemporary The Complete Book of Trades.

== See also ==
- Mary Ann Bell
