= Jacobsfriedhof =

Cemetery in Weimar, Thuringia, Germany

Coordinates: 50°59′00″N 11°19′40″E

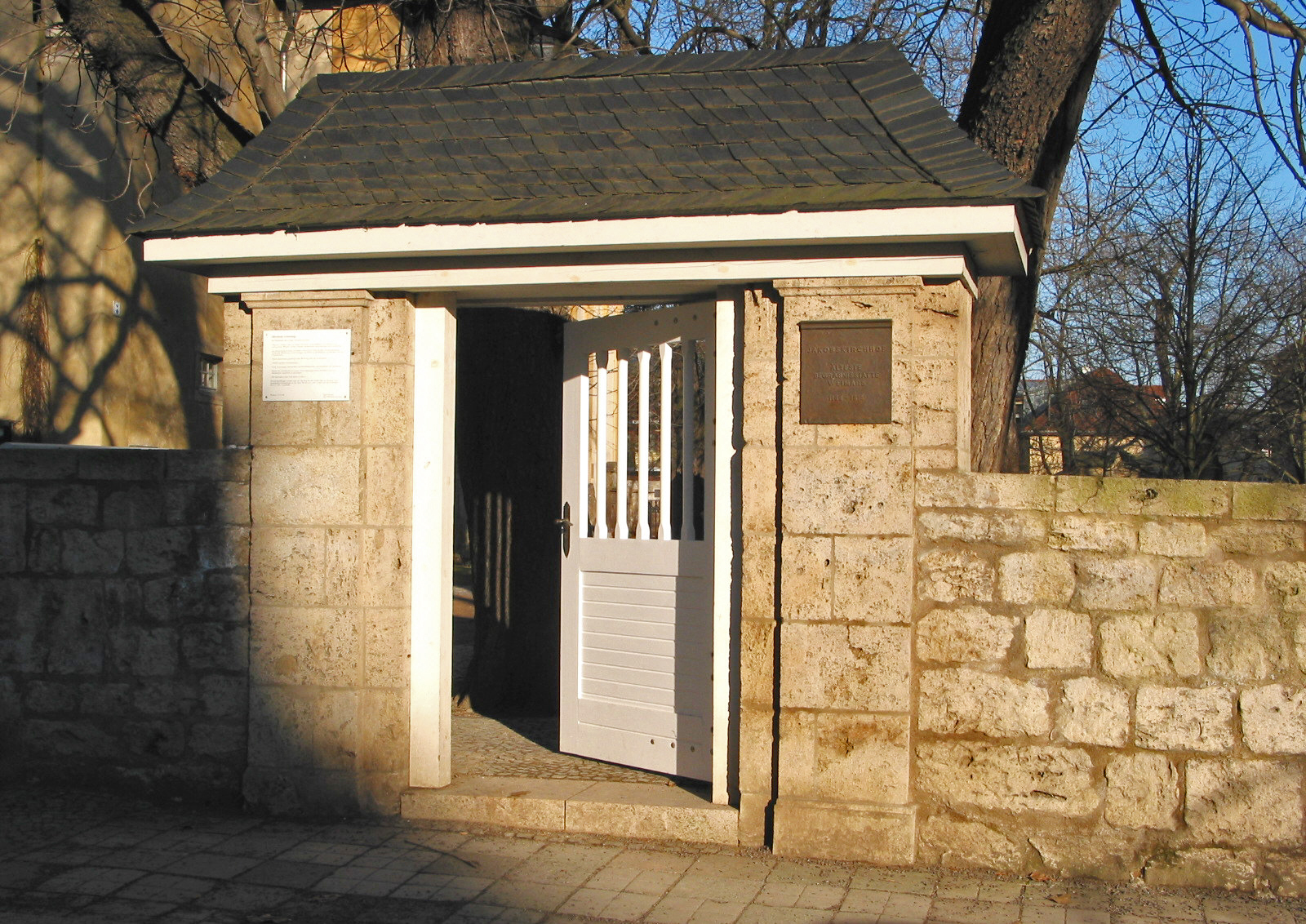
Entrance to the Jakobskirchhof

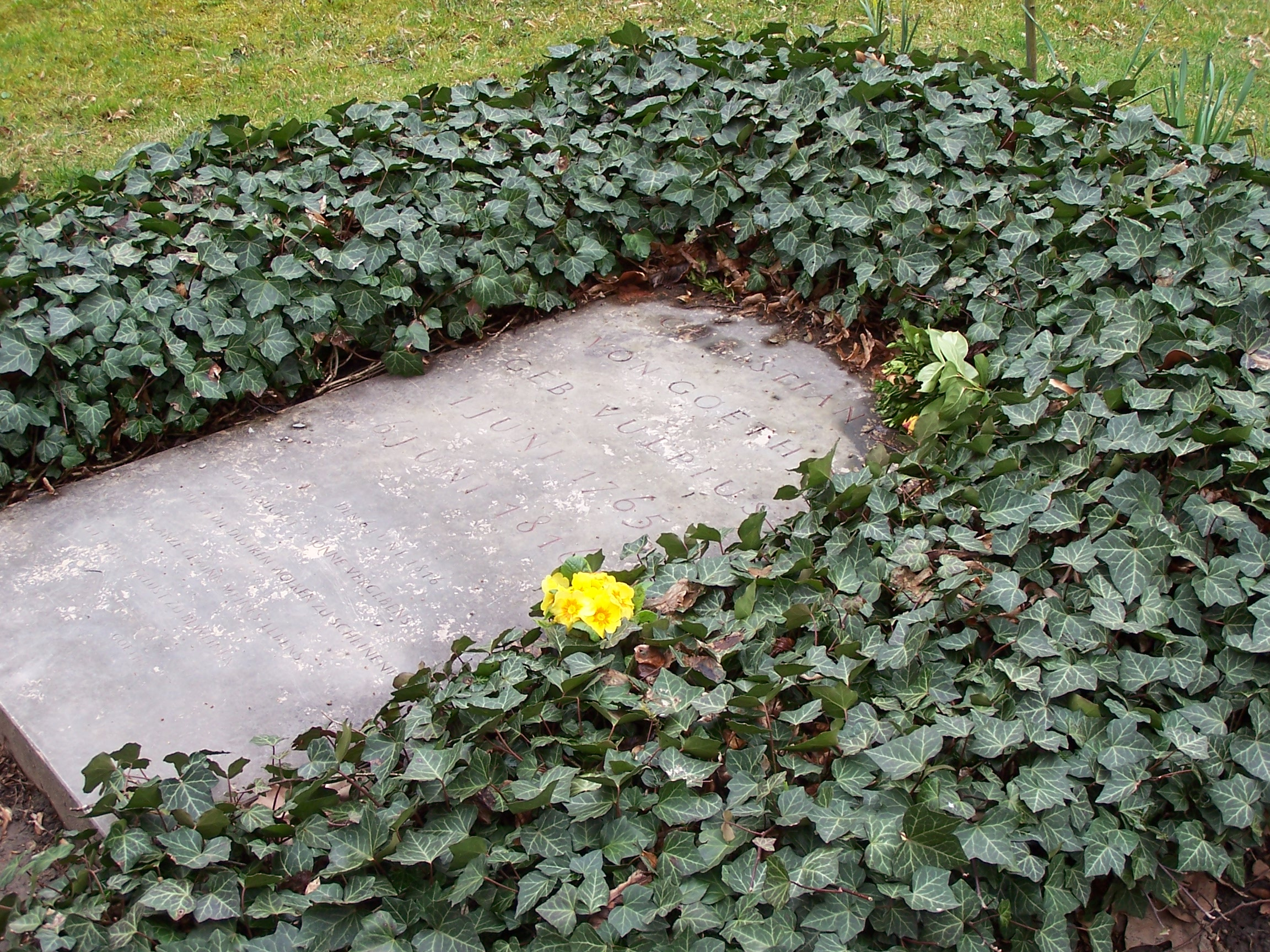
Grave of Christiane von Goethe née Vulpius, Goethe's wife

The Jacobsfriedhof, also known as the Jakobskirchhof ("St. James's Burial Ground" or "Churchyard"), is the oldest extant burial ground in Weimar, Thuringia, Germany, on land round the Jakobskirche (St. James's Church). The first burials took place here as early as the 12th century. The burial ground is located in the Jacobsvorstadt, which in the Middle Ages provided accommodation outside the city walls for pilgrims on their way to Santiago de Compostela (and today forms part of the historic Old Town under UNESCO protection).

From 1530 to 1818 it was the only burial ground in Weimar. After 1818, when the "Neue Friedhof vor dem Frauentore" ("New Burial Ground before the Gate of Our Lady") was opened, now known as the Historical Cemetery, Weimar, many of the graves in the Jacobsfriedhof were levelled. From 1840 no more burials took place here, and the burial ground fell slowly into disrepair. Later the Weimar municipal authorities took it over and converted the burial ground into gardens. The Jacobsfriedhof today is part of the Klassik Stiftung Weimar.

== The Kassengewölbe ==
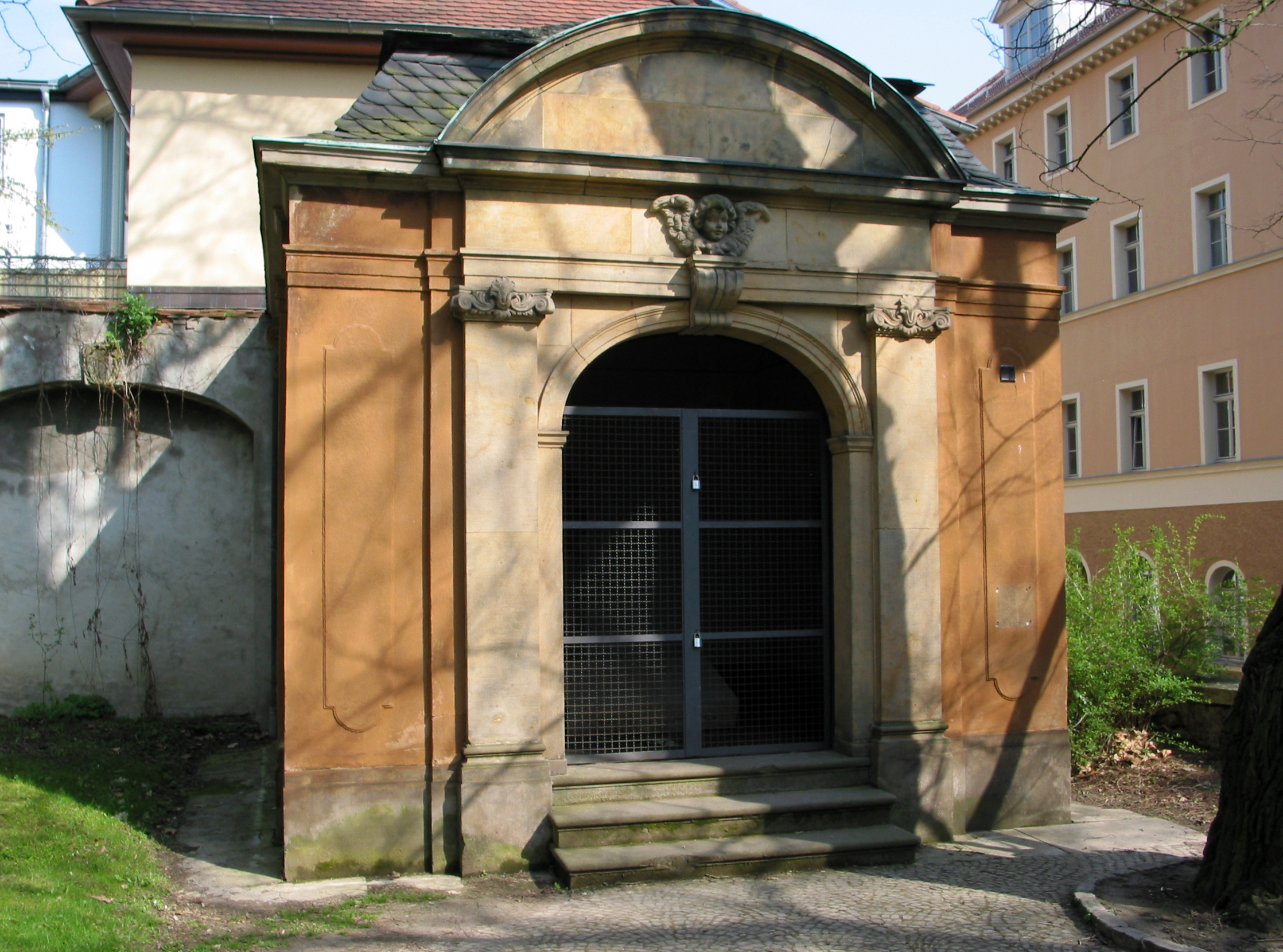
Baroque pavilion over the Kassengewölbe mausoleum

On the south-eastern edge of the Jacobfriedhof stands the mausoleum known as the Kassengewölbe, originally built in 1715 by a finance official as a private place of burial for himself and his family. In 1742 it became the property of the finance ministry or state exchequer, in German the Landeskasse, whence its present name Kassengewölbe: "exchequer vault". Since then it has principally served for the burials of people of high rank without the financial means for burials appropriate to their status. Such burials took place here from 1755 to 5 March 1823, including those of Luise von Göchhausen (a lady-in-waiting of Anna Amalia von Sachsen-Weimar-Eisenach) and the parents of Charlotte von Stein.

The present Baroque pavilion, formerly with a wrought-iron gate, that stands over the Kassengewölbe, is a reconstruction of 1913, as the original was levelled, with much of the burial ground, in 1854.

=== The Schiller Vault ===
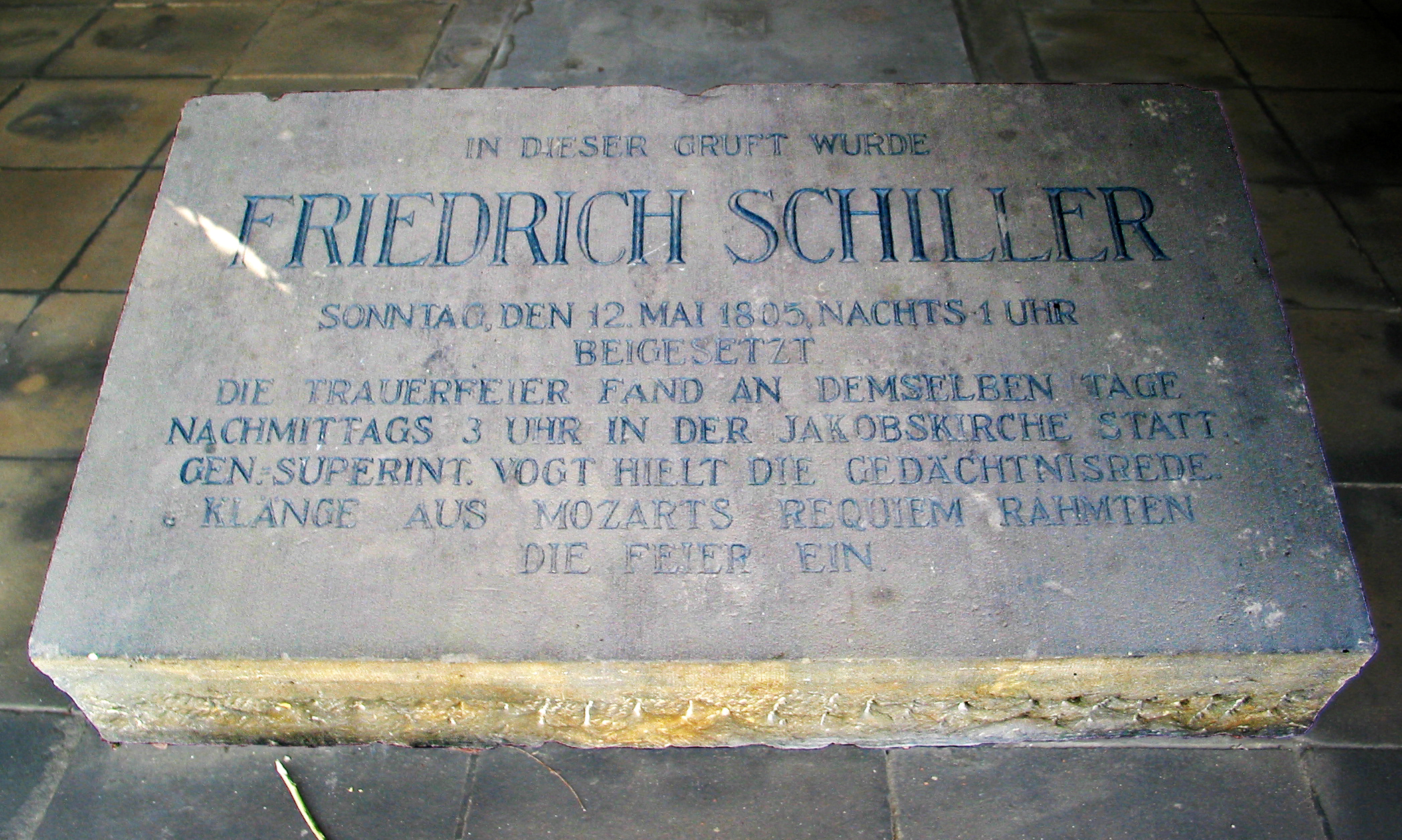
Friedrich Schiller's grave inscription in the Kassengewölbe

Because of his title of Hofrat and his elevation into the aristocracy in 1802, Friedrich von Schiller, who died on 9 May 1805, was among those whose remains were buried in the Kassengewölbe. The mausoleum is thus often referred to as the "Schiller Vault" (Schiller-Gruft). After 1826 the Bürgermeister of Weimar, Carl Leberecht Schwabe, had had Schiller's remains retrieved from the Kassengewölbe. The exhumed bones believed to be the poet's were transferred in 1827 to an oak coffin in the newly built Fürstengruft in the Historical Burial Ground. In 2008 a DNA analysis, which attracted much attention, showed that the bones in the coffin could not have been those of Schiller, and since then the coffin, next to that of Goethe, has stood empty. It is generally presumed that Schiller's real remains were lost when the Kassengewölbe and the burial ground were levelled, although there are many other theories.

== Notable graves ==
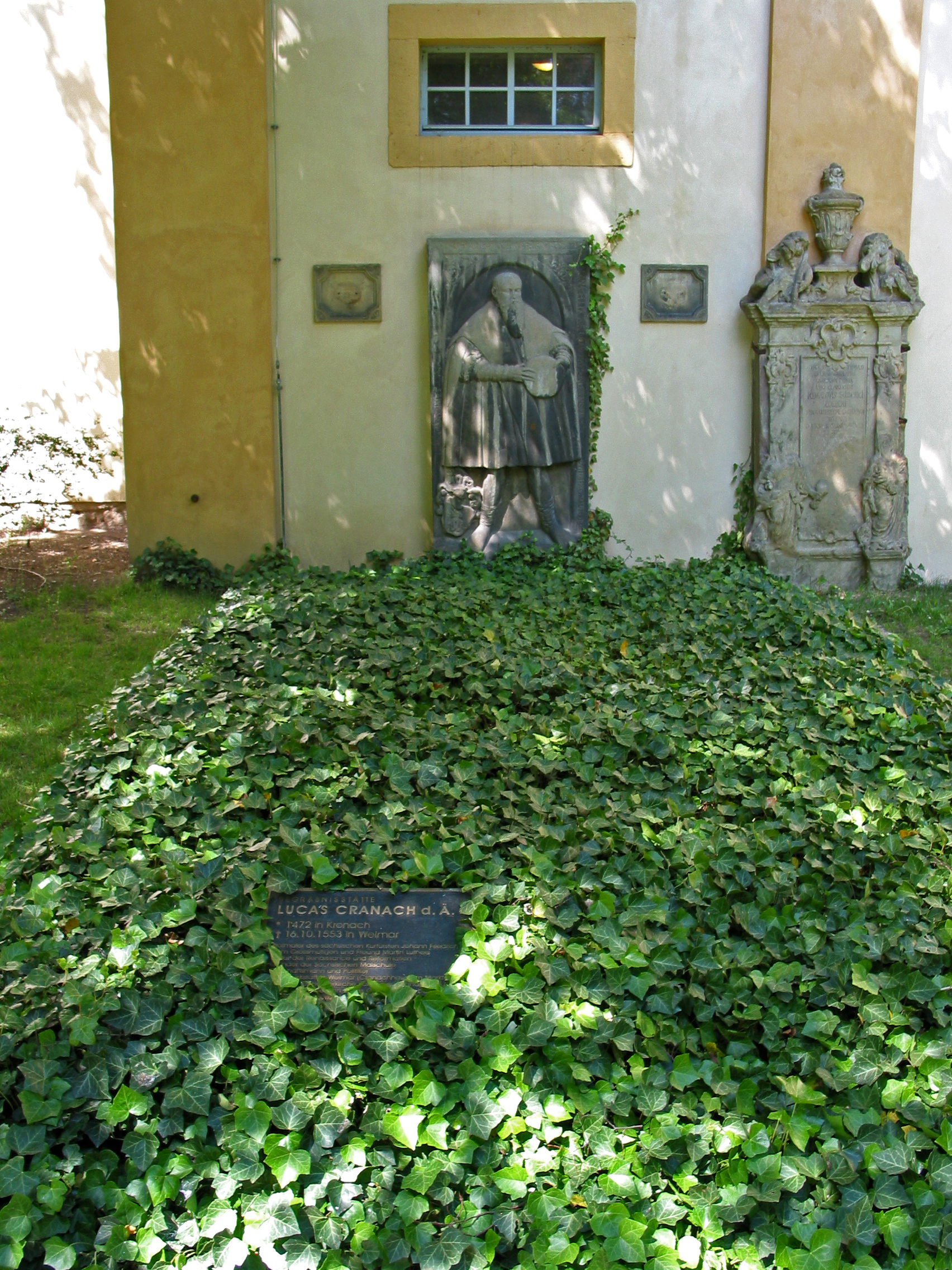
Grave of Lucas Cranach the Elder, to the right, with that of J. H. Löber

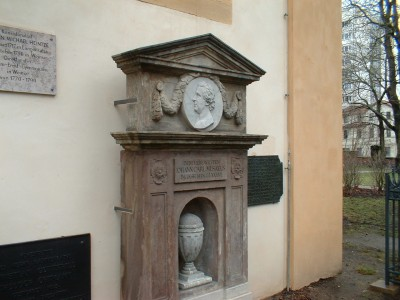
Grave of J.K.A. Musäus

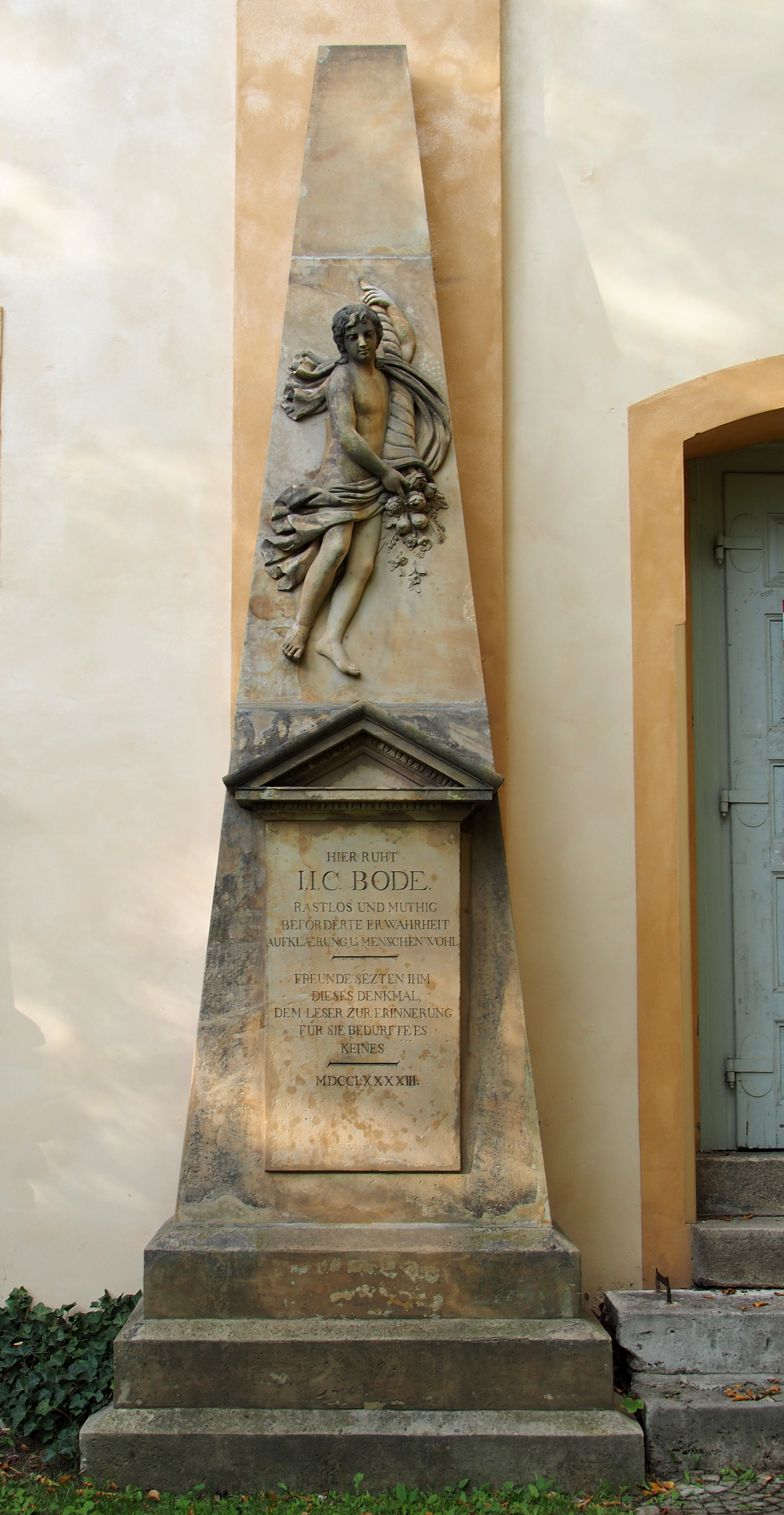
Grave of J.J.C. Bode

Name	Dates	Noted as	Monument
Lucas Cranach the Elder	1472–1553	Court painter	Painters' Vault (Malergruft), inscription on south church wall
Georg Neumark	1621–1681	Poet and composer of hymns	
Johann Franz August Zimmermann	died 1774	Footman; died during rescue operations in the castle fire of 1774	Column in front of the Kassengewölbe
Johann Martin Mieding	1725–1782	Court cabinet maker and stage set maker	Memorial in the south-eastern part of the burial ground
Johann Karl August Musäus	1735–1787	Author, literary critic, philologist and collector of fairy tales	Monument with portrait and urn on the south church wall
Johann Joachim Christoph Bode	1730–1793	Translator, journalist, publisher, music teacher, Freemason, Illuminatus	Grave stone on the south church wall
Christiane Becker-Neumann	1778–1797	Actress, pupil of Goethe	Grave in the south-eastern part of the burial ground
Martin Gottlieb Klauer	1742–1801	Court sculptor and art teacher at the Fürstliche freie Zeichenschule Weimar	Urn on column in the north-eastern part of the burial ground
Johann Heinrich Löber		Court painter	Painters' Vault (Malergruft), gravestone on the south church wall
Georg Melchior Kraus	1737–1806	Painter, engraver, friend of Goethe, director of the Fürstliche freie Zeichenschule	Painters' Vault (Malergruft), gravestone on the south church wall
Friedrich Wilhelm Carl von Schmettau	1742–1806	Lieutenant-General, topographer, cartographer and military author	Triangular stela with feather-crested helmet
Carl Ludwig Fernow	1763–1808	Art theorist and librarian	Memorial tablet on the north wall of the church
Maria Karoline Herder, née Flachsland	1750–1809	Wife of Johann Gottfried Herder (transferred to the Historical Cemetery during the 19th-century remodelling)	Grave formerly next to the east gate
Christiane von Goethe, née Vulpius	1765–1816	Wife of Johann Wolfgang von Goethe	Inscription with farewell verses by Goethe
Christian Gottlob von Voigt	1743–1819	Poet, President of the State Ministry, ministerial colleague of Goethe	Sandstone sarcophagus at the burial ground's northern boundary
Ferdinand Jagemann	1780–1820	Painter, Professor at the Fürstliche freie Zeichenschule	Memorial tablet on the south wall of the church
Christoph Wilhelm Günther	1755–1826	Theologian, author of children's stories, court and garrison preacher, Oberkonsistorialrat in Weimar; in 1806 married J.W. von Goethe and Christiane Vulpius in the Jakobskirche	Memorial tablet on the north wall of the church

== Sources ==
- Hannelore Henze, Doris-Annette Schmidt: Der Jacobskirchhof in Weimar. Königswinter 1998
