= Martin Gottlieb Klauer =

German sculptor

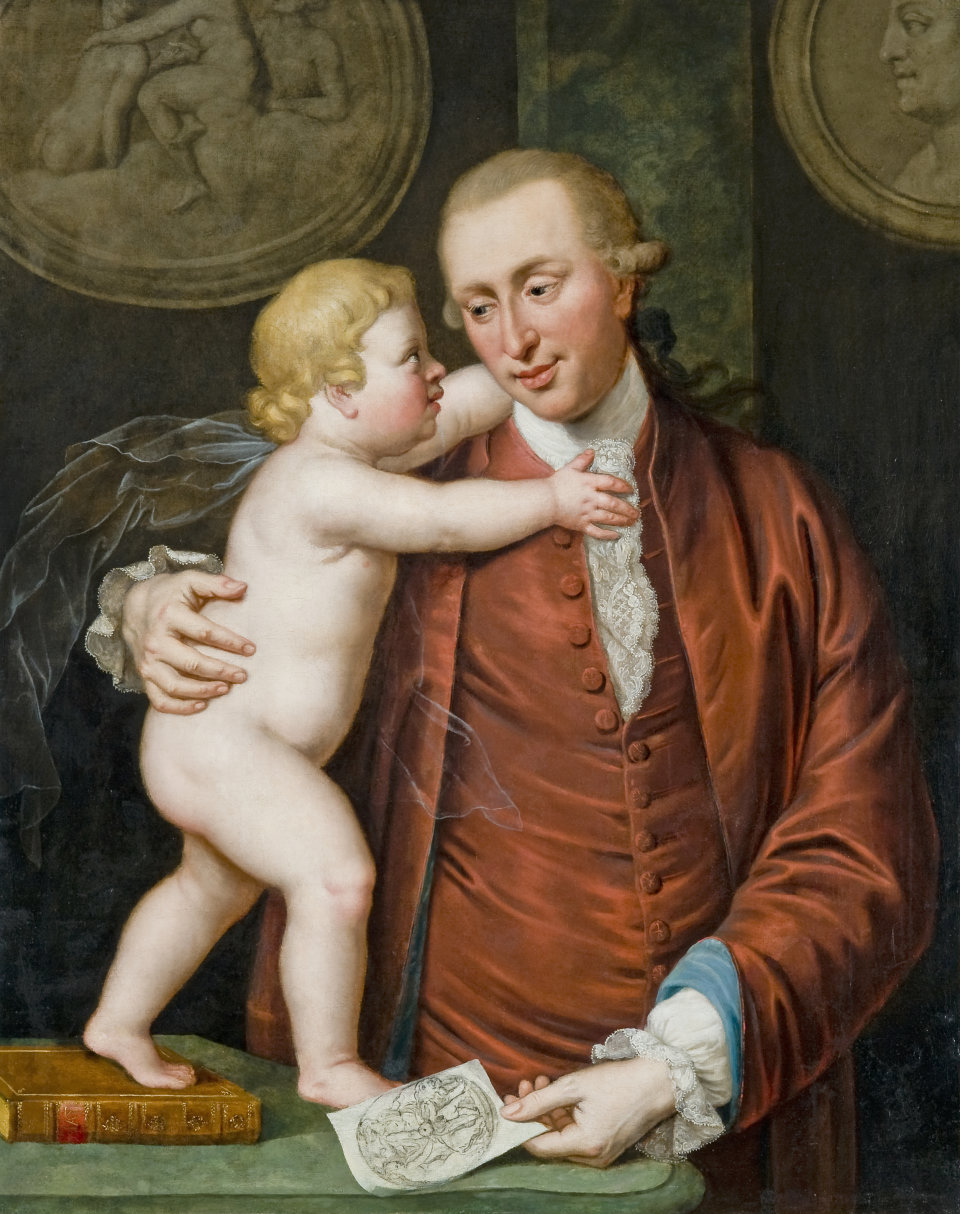
Martin Gottlieb Klauer; portrait by Jakob Samuel Beck (1775)

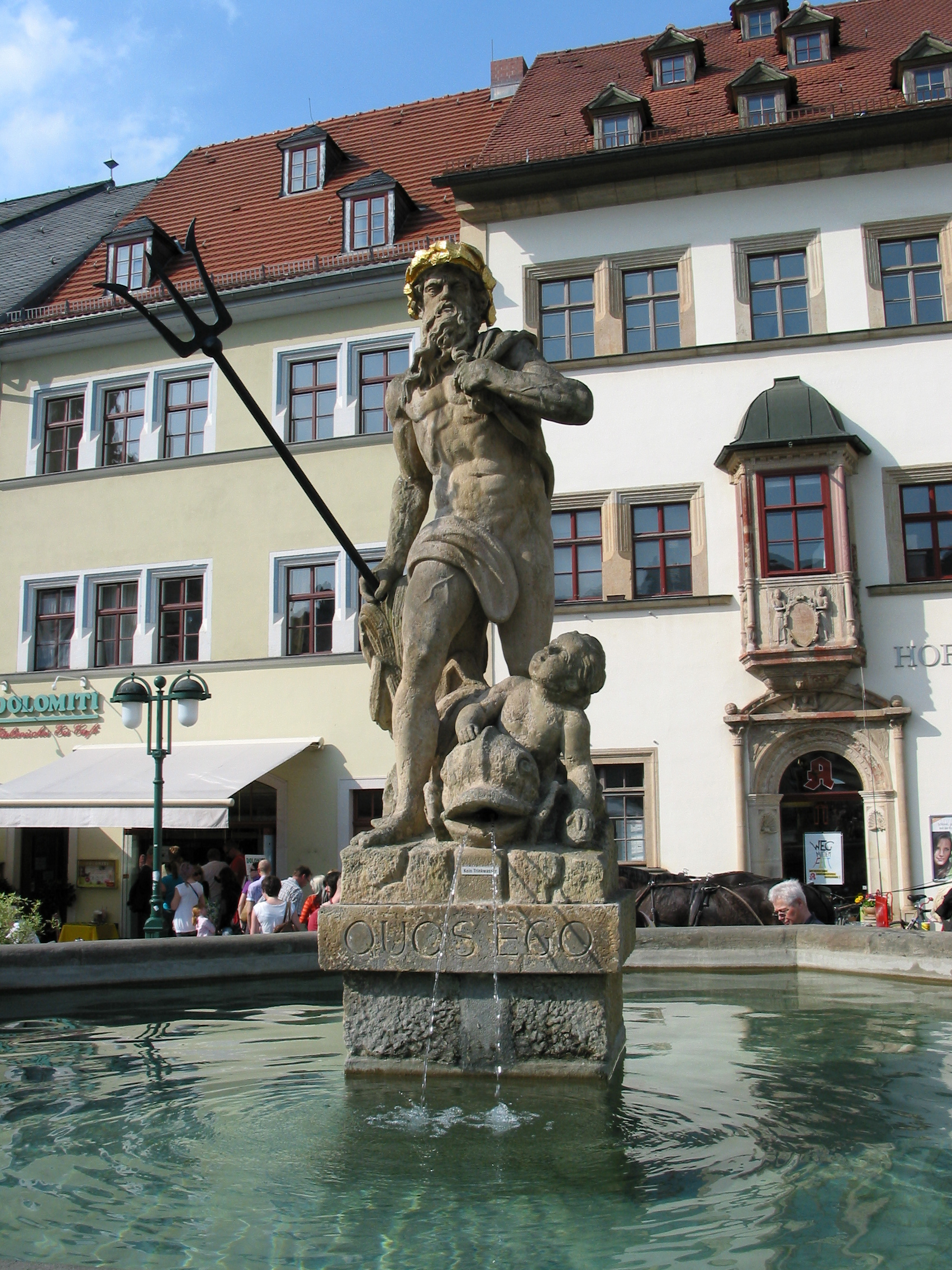
Neptune Fountain in the Weimar Marketplace

Martin Gottlieb Klauer (29 August 1742, Rudolstadt - 4 April 1801, Weimar) was a German sculptor, and one of the first teachers at the Weimar Princely Free Drawing School.

== Life and work ==
His father, Johann Michael Klauer, was a tailor. He learned his trade in his hometown, from the Court Sculptor, Karl Adolph Kändler. He probably worked in Gera and Potsdam. From 1769, he was an independent craftsman in Rudolstadt. In 1772, he married Johanna Kapler, the daughter of a winery manager. She died while giving birth to their first child, who also died.

In 1773, he was appointed a Court Sculptor in Weimar, by Duchess Anna Amalia. He also worked in Bad Berka, which was a major source of high quality sandstone. During this time, he became acquainted with Goethe. In 1776, he became one of the first teachers at the new Drawing school. Three years later, he made a trip to study the ancient plaster casts in Mannheim. His friendship with Johann Joachim Christoph Bode has led to speculation that he was a member of the Illuminati.

He was admired for his lifelike, monumental portrait busts. In addition to Goethe, he is known for definitive busts of Friedrich Schiller, Johann Gottfried Herder and Christoph Martin Wieland, as well as many other less familiar notables. In 1789, together with Friedrich Justin Bertuch, he opened an ornamental brick factory and produced small works in Terracotta; keeping a detailed catalog of everything produced there. He also did a few larger works; notably the statue of Neptune in the fountain at Weimar's marketplace. Although the great majority of his works are in Weimar, he occasionally went elsewhere; for example, four stone figures at the village church in Flurstedt.

He remarried in 1778, but nothing is known about his wife. They had two sons; one who died in infancy, and Johann Christian Ludwig, who also became a sculptor.

== Sources ==
- Christina Kröll (1977). "Klauer, Martin". Neue Deutsche Biographie (in German). Vol. 11. Berlin: Duncker & Humblot. pp. 713–714. (full text online).
- Katharina Lippold: "Klassizistische Terrakotten aus der »Kunstbacksteinfabrik« von Martin Gottlieb Klauer". In: Anna Amalia, Carl August und das Ereignis Weimar, Edited by Hellmut Seemann, Göttingen 2007, pp. 292–302 ISBN 978-3-8353-0148-1
- Jeanette Lauterbach, Hermann Hofmann, "Klassizistische Bildhauerkunst im Umkreis Goethes", Thüringer Landesmuseum Heidecksburg, 2003 ISBN 978-3-910013-55-1
- Charlotte Schreiter: Antike um jeden Preis. Gipsabgüsse und Kopien antiker Plastik am Ende des 18. Jahrhunderts, De Gruyter, 2014, pp.329–337 ISBN 978-3-11-031688-9
