= Karl Ludwig Fernow =

German art critic and archaeologist (1763–1808)

Karl Ludwig Fernow

Karl Ludwig Fernow (19 November 1763 – 4 December 1808) was a German art critic and archaeologist.

== Early life ==
Fernow was born in Pomerania, the son of a servant in the household of the lord of Blumenhagen. At the age of twelve he became clerk to a notary, and was afterwards apprenticed to a druggist. While serving his time he had the misfortune accidentally to shoot a young man who came to visit him; and although through the intercession of his master he escaped prosecution, the untoward event weighed heavily on his mind, and led him at the close of his apprenticeship to quit his native place.

== Art career ==
He obtained a situation at Lübeck, where he had leisure to cultivate his natural taste for drawing and poetry. Having formed an acquaintance with the painter Asmus Jacob Carstens, whose influence was an important stimulus and help to him, he renounced his trade of druggist, and set up as a portrait-painter and drawing-master. At Ludwigslust he fell in love with a young girl, and followed her to Weimar; but failing in his suit, he went next to Jena. There he was introduced to Professor Reinhold, and in his house met the Danish poet Jens Immanuel Baggesen. The latter invited him to accompany him to Switzerland and Italy, a proposal which in 1794 he eagerly accepted for the sake of the opportunity of furthering his studies in the fine arts. On Baggesen's return to Denmark, Fernow, assisted by some of his friends, visited Rome and made some stay there. He now renewed his intercourse with Carstens, who had settled at Rome, and applied himself to the study of the history and theory of the fine arts and of the Italian language and literature. Fernow's critiques and opinions have been questioned and poorly received due to his lack of formal qualification. His personal attacks on artists are thought to reflect his own lack of artistic talent and insight. Fernow self-proclaimed to have made rapid progress, he was soon semi-qualified to give a course of lectures on archaeology, which was attended by the principal artists then at Rome. Having married a Roman lady, he returned in 1802 to Germany, and was appointed in the following year professor extraordinary of Italian literature at Jena.

== Librarian ==
In 1804, he accepted the post of librarian to Amalia, Dowager Duchess of Weimar, which gave him the leisure he desired for the purpose of turning to account the literary and archaeological researches in which he had engaged at Rome. Fernow died in 1808 at Weimar, where he is buried in the Jacobsfriedhof.

== Works and biography ==
His most valuable work, the Romische Studien, appeared in 3 volumes between 1806 and 1808. Among his other works are Das Leben des Kunstlers Carstens (1806), Ariostos Lebenslauf (1809), and Francesco Petrarca (1818).

A memoir of his life by Johanna Schopenhauer, mother of the philosopher, Arthur Schopenhauer, appeared in 1810, and a complete edition of his works in 1829.
