= August von Herder =

German geologist and mineralogist

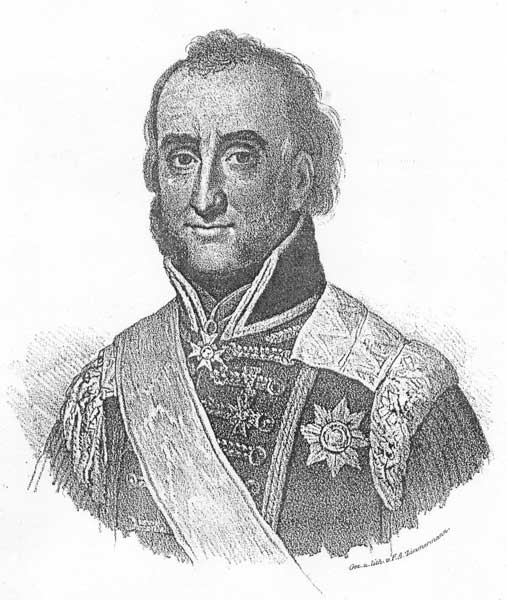
- Sigismund August Wolfgang von Herder Lithography by F. A. Zimmermann, 1841
- Born: Siegmund August Wolfgang Herder; 18 August 1776; Bückeburg, Schaumburg-Lippe, Germany
- Died: 29 January 1838; Dresden, Saxony, Germany
- Occupation(s): Mining Engineer; Director of Mines for Saxony
- Spouse(s): Susanne Sophie Beyer (1781–1848) born Hähnel: she was a widow in 1805 when she married von Herder.
- Children: Eugen Wolfgang von Herder (1810–1853)
- Parent(s): Johann Gottfried Herder (1744–1803); Maria Karoline Flachsland (1750–1809)

August von Herder (18 August 1776 - 29 January 1838) was a German geologist and mineralogist. From 1813 he served in a succession of increasingly senior posts in the Saxon government mines service, ending up in 1826 as government mining director ("Berghauptmann"). He was an energetic and highly effective moderniser of the Saxon mining industry.

== Biography ==
Sigismund August Wolfgang Herder was born in Bückeburg, an economically diversified hill-town to the west of Hanover. Bückeburg owed much of its prosperity and intellectual dynamism to its status as the long-established administrative and commercial hub of Schaumburg-Lippe. The adjacent Bückeberg hills were an important source of building stone. However, later during 1776, August's family relocated to Weimar after his father accepted a church appointment there, mediated through the intervention of his friend Johann Wolfgang von Goethe, as "Generalsuperintendent". August was the second son of the philosopher-poet Johann Gottfried Herder (1744-1803) and his wife, born Maria Karoline Flachsland (1750-1809). Born into an enlightenment milieu, his godparents included Goethe, the Lutheran philosopher Johann Georg Hamann and the journalist-poet Matthias Claudius. Goethe, still a young man, undertook frequent trips to Italy during the 1780s and loved children. Being extremely fond of the Herder children, he allowed them to accompany him. As a teenager Goethe had himself acquired the habit of undertaking lengthy exploratory hikes through the countryside, and having retained the habit into adulthood, he sometimes permitted his friend's teenager son August to accompany him on his "expeditions". Another of his father's friends was the "Africa explorer" and naturalist August von Einsiedel. It was through the interest of these two mentors that August von Herder's interest in Natural sciences, and more specifically in Mineralogy, was awakened.

He attended the well regarded Wilhelm-Ernst-Gymnasium (secondary school) in Weimar (where his father served as school-director between 1776 and 1791). He was then sent with his younger brother Wilhelm to spend a year during 1794/95 at Neuchâtel on the francophone western side of Switzerland, principally so that the boys might improve their mastery of the French language. In 1795 he enrolled as a student at the University of Jena. After a year her transferred to Göttingen. He studied Mathematics, Physics, Chemistry and Mineralogy. He transferred again in 1797, this time to the specialist Mining Academy at Freiberg in Saxony, where he studied for the next three years. At the Mining Academy he was powerfully influenced by the teaching of the pioneering geologist Abraham Gottlob Werner. Among his student contemporaries Baron von Hardenberg (generally known in sources simply by his literary pseudonym as "Novalis") and Henrik Steffens became particularly well-trusted friends. During this period he was a co-founder of the "Erzgebirgischen Landsmannschaft der Montanen", a student fraternity with its regional focus on the Erzgebirgisch mining region, and later known more simply as the "Corps Montania". Herder had long since decided to make a science-based career in mining, which in Saxony would probably lead to work in government service in the so-called "Berg- und Hüttenwesen" (mines department). That in turn required certain legal and administrative training and qualifications, which necessitated a move to the University of Wittenberg. Two years later, in 1802, he emerged with a doctorate. In 1802 his father was ennobled by Prince-elector Maximilian IV Joseph of Bavaria. The family name, hitherto "Herder", became "von Herder": It is with the name "von Herder" that subsequent sources normally identify family members.

In 1802, after passing the necessary state exams at Freiberg, von Herder embarked on his professional career, taking a position as Mining Services Inspector ("Bergamtsassessor") with responsibilities covering the mines in Marienberg, Geyer, Ehrenfriedersdorf and Schneeberg. Promotion during the ensuring twenty years was unusually rapid. In 1804 he was returned to Freiberg as Senior Mining Services Assessor ("Oberhüttenamtsassessor"), which seems to have involved Mines Services Commissioner duties and wider oversight powers than before. Prussian and Austrian defeat in 1806 meant the removal of Prussian power from central Germany and an end to the Holy Roman empire, so there could be no longer any Electorate of Saxony: Saxony became instead a "kingdom", with imperial (i.e. French) backing. War and the associated international power shifts brought an increased emphasis on regulation and adherence. In 1810 von Herder was appointed to the Mines Council. In 1817 he was given a seat and a vote on the Saxon Privy Budget Council ("Geheim Finanzkollegium") and in 1821 on the Privy Mines Council ("Geheim Bergkollegium"). In 1819 he was appointed deputy to the government Mines Director ("Vizeberghauptmann") and in 1826 Mines Director ("Oberberghauptmann"), which was the highest position in the Saxon Mines Department.

The Longstanding Saxon Elector Frederick Augustus I became both the King of Saxony and the Duke of Warsaw in 1807, following political constitutional changes imposed by the emperor. In 1809 the King-Duke mandated von Herder to organise the iron works at Panki (Upper Silesia) which, under the new arrangements, had become crown property. In 1810 von Herder's negotiating skills were called into play when he headed up the Saxon team in negotiations with the Austrian government over the future organisation of the highly valuable Wieliczka Salt Mine, control and ownership of which was shared jointly by Austria and Saxony due to the frontier changes of 1807. During this period von Herder had the opportunity to undertake a succession of information gathering trips, visiting working mining installations in Styria, Hungary, Sweden, Norway, the southern part of what later became Belgium, France, the Rhineland and, closer to home, the Harz region. Through his travels he accumulated a large amount of valuable knowledge on mining and metallurgy. In 1811 he teamed up with Friedrich von Zedtwitz to develop a strategic plan for improving the mines in "Poland". In recognition, the king conferred a Barony on him in 1816. He continued to be engaged in negotiations over regulating the still jointly controlled Wieliczka Salt Mine, but negotiations were repeatedly delayed or postponed.

The Napoleonic Wars ended with the establishment new European order which involved a major expansion of Prussian power and territory. That reflected a determination on the part of the victorious governments to create an effective military bulwark against the dangers of any further attempt by some future French emperor to take over in Europe. Much of the territory awarded to Prussia in 1815 had previously been part of the neighbouring Kingdom of Saxony. The Saxon king had been taken prisoner by the Prussians in October 1813, and as a former ally of Napoleon had been debarred from participating in the discussions. Nevertheless, Prussian demands that Saxony should be wholly subsumed into an enlarged version of Prussia alarmed the Austrians. The Kingdom of Saxony, though much diminished, was preserved, retaining Leipzig, Dresden and, importantly, the rich mining region in the south. In 1813, with the newly available insight that what remained of the French imperial army was not, after all, invincible, von Herder made his home near the Mining Academy at Freiberg and started work on an ambitious plan to rebuild and modernize the Saxon mining industry. In addition to the economic imperatives, there was also a socio-political dimension to the Saxon state making its presence felt among the mining communities in the Erzgebirgisch region. The Russian and Prussian armies, having inflicted a crushing defeat on Napoleon on Saxon territory, had shown little appetite for a rapid return to their northern and eastern homelands. Implementation of von Herder's plan was nevertheless under way by 1817. Many of the changes applied techniques that von Herder had studied during his visits to mines elsewhere in Europe over the preceding four years. They involved technical improvements, developing new tools and materials, using new machines, new methods for cutting into the rock face, new approaches to control and verification and a more rigorous approach to measurement. New smelting techniques were applied and efficiency was greatly improved through his insistence on the use of hard coal (rather than brown coal) to ensure sufficient heat for smelting. He also improved efficiency by applying a more systematic approach to mines management.

A number of new enterprises were launched with von Herder's encouragement and backing. One of the most important was the Antonshütte smelting plant in the Schwarzwasser valley south of Chemnitz. Probably his most ambitious project was one involving draining the mines in the entire Freiberg region with a shared underground channel, which aroused much interest from contemporary illuminati, including both Alexander von Humboldt and the mentor of his adolescence, Goethe. The project was implemented only after his death, using for the most part von Herder's original plans, albeit 90 meters shorter and slightly shallower than his plans had envisaged. It has become known as the Rothschönberger Stolln.

Von Herder also used his increasingly eminent position in the state apparatus to encourage and promote academic research. As a trustee of the Freiberg Mining Academy he devoted time and energy to the university, resulting in improvements to the quality of research and more stringent admission criteria for students. A particularly important cause that he backed, starting in 1821, was the "drop testing" employed originally by Christian Brendel and Ferdinand Reich to test the earth's rotation, at the "Dreibrüderschacht" (deep shaft), just outside Freiberg. With Brendel's help he standardised the Saxon "Berglachter" measure at precisely two French meters. With Reich he made a series of observations on underground temperatures and on electrical currents through ore veins.

In 1827 he launched the "Kalender für den Sächsischen Berg- und Hüttenmann" (as it was initially known), a mining industry year book filled with statistics and scientific-technical articles: it was published at his instigation by the Freiberg Mining Academy.

It is not entirely surprising that a son of Johann Gottfried von Herder should have been a lover of music and poetry. He promoted with enthusiasm the sharing and performing of mining songs. With his encouragement the Freiberg "Berghautboisten-Corps" (literally, "Miners' Oboists' Band") was transformed for the better during the 1820s. He took a memorable initiative in 1824 by introducing "Russian horns" to the band. He had a particular passion for parading through the surrounding mountains in splendid ceremonial attire. During his final years the king even allowed him to wear a ceremonial sabre adorned with 108 "diamonds" as part of his own uniform. The sabre had been a present from Prince Miloš Obrenović of Serbia during a lengthy visit Herder had undertaken to Serbia, at the prince's invitation, to study and report on the geological conditions and the mining operations there. During his visit to Serbia Herder was also responsible for a comprehensive upgrade of the thermal baths at Vrnjačka Banja. It was also at Herder's instigation that the "Bergmusikverein" ("Mines Music Association") was founded in Freiberg in 1829.

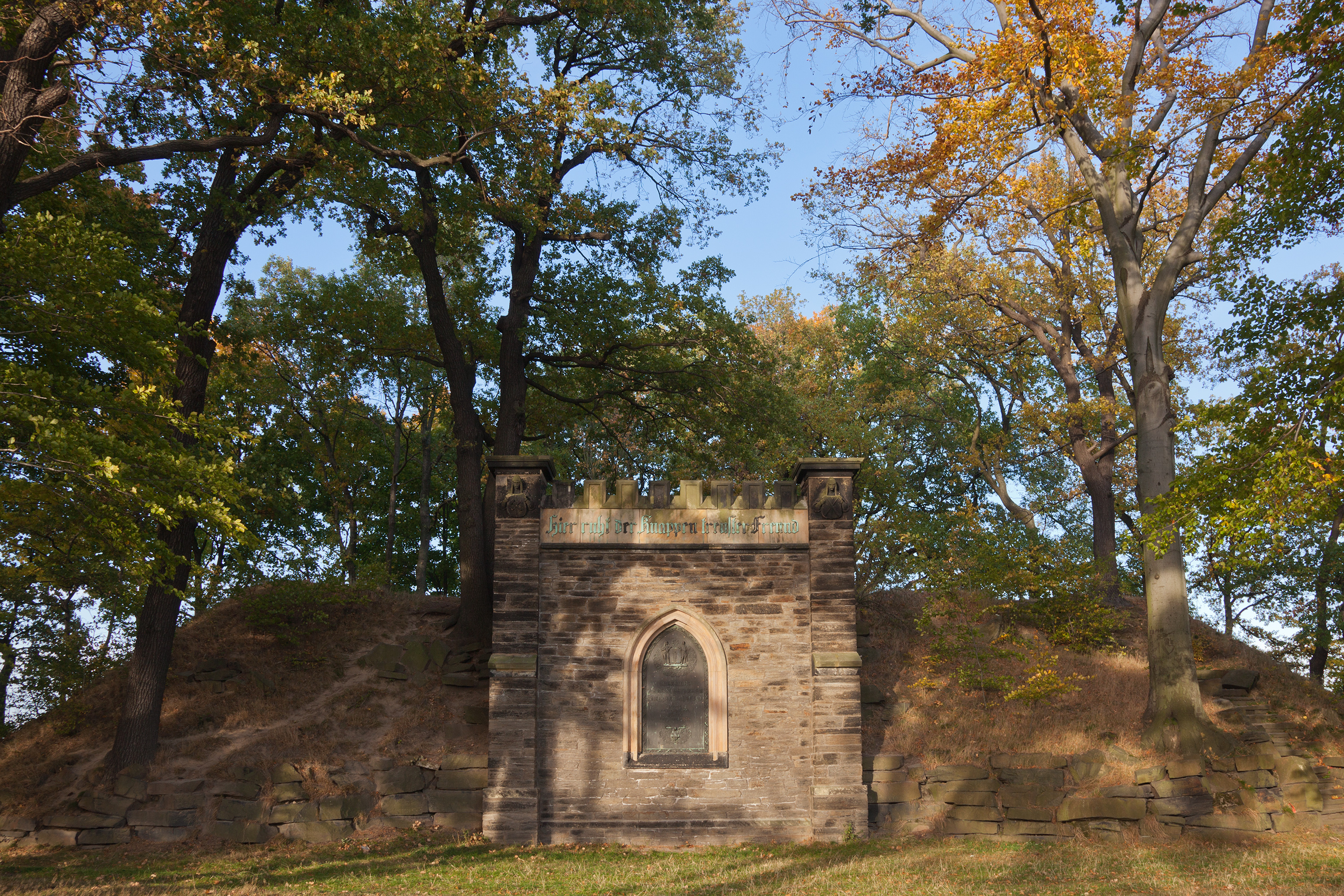
"Hier Ruht der Knappen treuster Freund" "Here rests the miner's truest friend" (the grave memorial of S. A. W. Herder)

During his 1835 stay in Serbia, August von Herder fell ill with an acute rheumatic disorder. A cure at the thermal resort of Karlsbad brought little respite from his suffering. At the end of 1837 he travelled to Dresden to be treated for an intestinal disorder. and died on 29 January 1838, a few days before he had been scheduled to undergo an operation.

In accordance with his last wishes, the body of the "friend to al the miners" was buried on the edge of the waste heap from the "Three Kings Mine" just outside Freiberg. The burial was preceded by a ceremonial night-time procession. An appropriately impressive memorial, based on a design by Eduard Heuchler, was placed over the grave.

== Family ==
August von Herder married Susanne Sophie Berger at Schneeberg on 17 June 1805. The bride, born Susanne Sophie Hähnel, was the widow of a protestant church minister. The geologist-politician Eugen Wolfgang von Herder (1810–1853) was the couple's only child, as far as is known.
