= Karoline Herder =

German editor

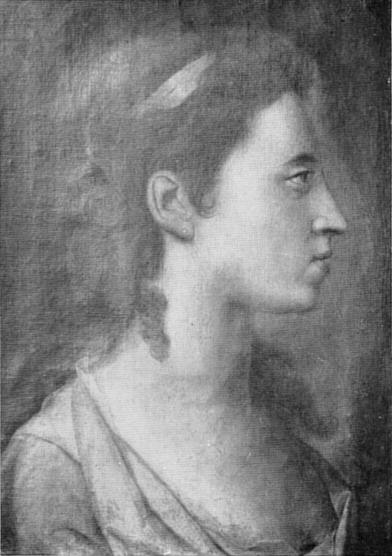
- Karoline Herder, née Flachsland c. 1770-1773
- Born: Maria Karoline Flachsland; 28 January 1750; Reichenweiler, Alsace, France
- Died: 15 September 1809 (aged 59); Weimar, Grand duchy of Saxe-Weimar
- Burial place: Jacobsfriedhof cemetery, Weimar
- Other name: Caroline Herder
- Occupation: Editor
- Spouse: Johann Gottfried Herder (m. 1773, d. 1802)
- Children: Wilhelm Gottfried; Sigismund August; Wilhelm Ludwig Ernst; Karl Emil Adelbert; Luise Theodore Emilie; Emil Ernst Gottfried; Rinaldo Gottfried
- Parents: Johann Friedrich Flachsland (father); Rosina Catharina Mauritii (mother)

Maria Karoline Herder (28 January 1750 Reichenweier, Alsace — 15 September 1809 Weimar, Saxe-Weimar-Eisenach) was a German editor who collected and published the works of her famous husband, philosopher Johann Gottfried Herder.

== Biography ==
=== Family and education ===
She was born Maria Karoline Flachsland, the daughter of Johann Friedrich Flachsland (1715–1755) and his wife Rosina Catharina Mauritii (1717–1765). Orphaned at a young age, she went to live at the home of her sister Friederike Katharina (1744–1801) in Darmstadt, which in 1761 got married statesman Andreas Peter von Hesse (1728–1803).

Her other sister, Ernestine Rosine, had been the mistress of Louis IX of Hesse-Darmstadt since 1761. She married in 1766 and was subsequently thrown out by Louis, endowed with a pension of 500 guilders. Ernestine later became mentally disturbed, so Maria Carolina received guardianship over her and also the pension. She placed Ernestine in an institution shortly thereafter, where she soon died.

In Darmstadt, she became a member of the "Darmstadt Circle," which became one of the most important developers of a concept they called "sensitivity." Johann Wolfgang von Goethe, who soon became her friend, Franz Michael Leuchsenring, Sophie von La Roche, Johann Heinrich Merck and her future husband Johann Gottfried Herder belonged to the group.

Karoline (sometimes spelled Caroline or Carolina) was considered very open-minded, highly educated, and proficient in several languages. Within the Circle, she was called "Psyche." Later, Goethe called her his "sister."

Through Merck's mediation, Karoline met Herder, who was passing through, in August 1770. Their subsequent correspondence is among the most important documents of the time, but also reveals the ambivalence of their characters in the two lovers' struggle to reach a decision. Despite her sober and practical approach to life, however, the passionate woman often succumbed to her excitable temperament, knew few bounds in love and hate, and judged hastily and sometimes unfairly.

=== Marriage and children ===
On 2 May 1773, Karoline married Johann Gottfried Herder (1744–1803) in Darmstadt and took his surname. After the wedding, they moved to Bückeburg where he was named court preacher. In their secluded residence, the couple lived their "happiest" and spiritually fruitful time. In Buckeburg the young family grew significantly with Wilhelm Gottfried (1774–1806) and Sigismund August (1776–1838).

Through Goethe's mediation, the family moved to Weimar in 1776 with both sons and her sister Ernestine's five-year-old daughter. The position as a consistory councilor at the Weimar court did not bring Herder what he had hoped for. The Herders found life in the small royal city and their relationship with Goethe disappointing. Nevertheless, they remained in Weimar for their entire lives. The marriage produced five more children: Wilhelm Ludwig Ernst (1778–1842), Karl Emil Adelbert (1779–1857), Luise Theodore Emilie (1781–1860), Emil Ernst Gottfried (1783–1855) and Rinaldo Gottfried (b. 1790).

=== Works ===
After Herder's appointment to Weimar in 1776, a new sphere of influence opened up for her wife, among her growing family and her husband's friends; she also constantly participated in his official and literary work. She became the "Theano" of the "Gott" gespräche (1787), assisted in the creation of many of Herder's works (the "Volkslieder," the "Ideen," the "Zerstreute Blätter"), and, especially in later years, conducted his extensive correspondence as his "secretaire." Above all, however, her entire care, although she herself was often ill, was devoted to her aging, declining husband.

During her marriage, Karoline always took part in her husband's official and literary work and was also an unnamed helper in the creation of many of his works. "No Johann Gottfried Herder without Karoline," poet Johann Gleim boasted of her.

Her identification with her husband's life and work was consistent throughout her life. She worked tirelessly on his reputation not only during his lifetime but also after his death. As secretary and editor of his writings and the author of numerous letters, as well as a biographer and editor of Herder-Werke, Karoline Herder remained one of the female figures in the Weimar circle of Neoclassicists.

=== Last years ===
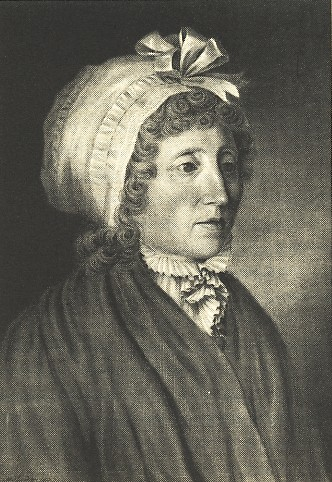
Karoline Herder (c. 1800), chalk drawing by Adam Weide

A year before Johann Gottfried Herder's death in 1802, he was ennobled by the Elector-Prince of Bavaria, and this act permitted him to add the prefix "von" to his last name. At the same time Karoline added it to hers.

She suffered a severe blow when Goethe, in 1795, turned away from her during a financial dispute with Duke Karl August. From then on, they had little contact, but she remained spiritually close to him. Her friendship with Johann Gleim, Johann Georg Müller in Schaffhausen, and Jean Paul made her happy, but could not compensate for this loss. After her husband's death in 1803, her sole concern was for her sons, who were living in difficult circumstances, the publication of Herder's complete works, which she finally completed alone with Johann Georg Müller at Cotta from 1805 onwards, albeit not without some shortcomings, and the tireless promotion of his ideas.

Maria Karoline von Herder died in Weimar on 15 September 1809 at 59 years of age and was buried there in the old Jakobsfriedhof (Jacob's cemetery).

== Works ==
- Herder, C. Memories from the life of Joh. Gottfried von Herder. Collected and described by Maria Carolina von Herder. 2 vols., Tübingen, 1820
