= Flurstedt =

- Ortsteil of Bad Sulza
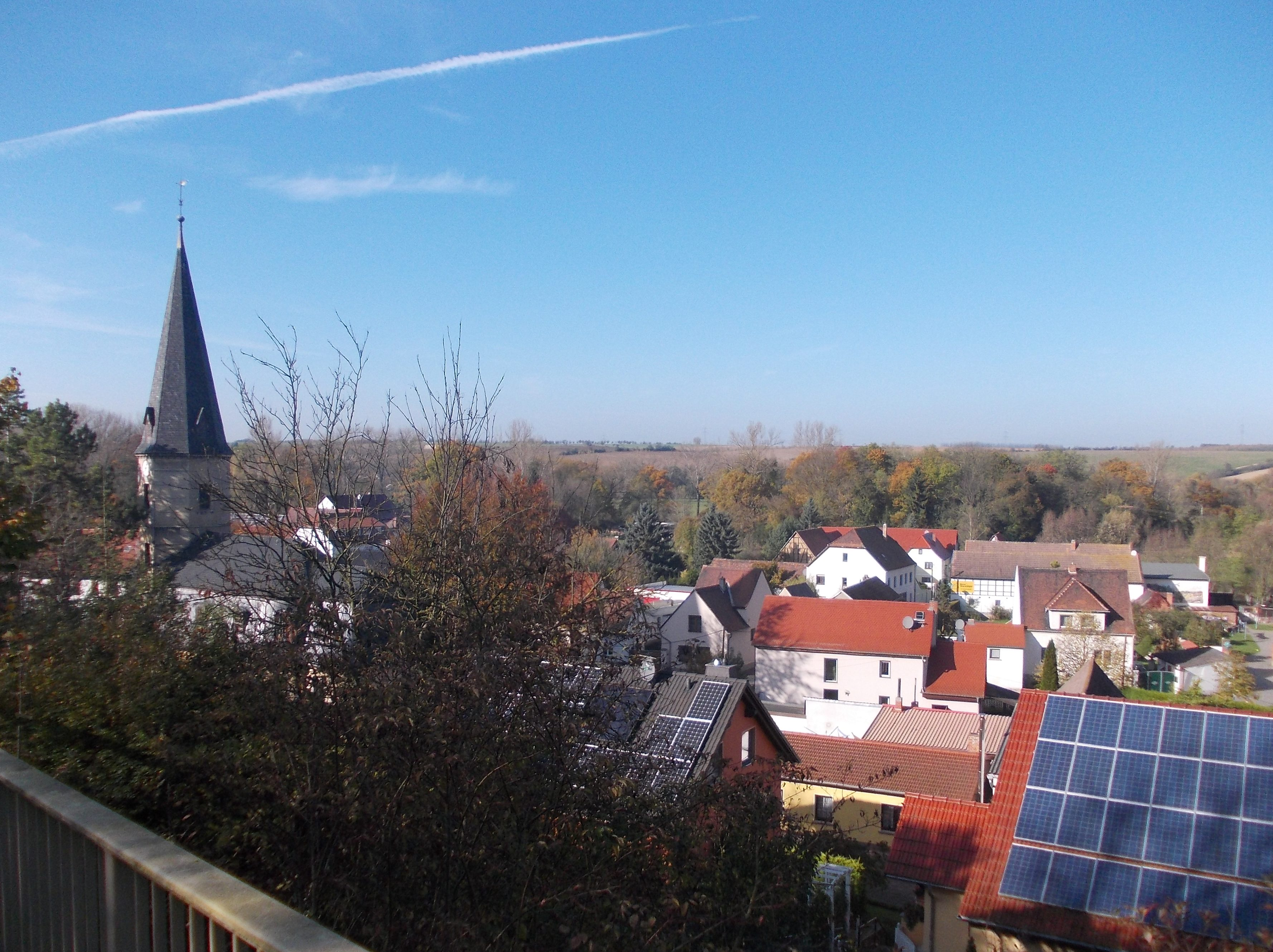
- Interactive map of Flurstedt
- Location within Germany Location within Thuringia
- Coordinates: 51°3′33″N 11°33′30″E
- Country: Germany
- State: Thuringia
- District: Weimarer Land
- Town: Bad Sulza

Area
  - Total: 4.11 km^{2} (1.59 sq mi)
- Elevation: 150 m (490 ft)

Population (2025-01)
  - Total: 229
  - Density: 55.7/km^{2} (144/sq mi)
- Time zone: UTC+01:00 (CET)
  - Summer (DST): UTC+02:00 (CEST)
- Postal codes: 99510
- Dialling codes: 03644
- Vehicle registration: AP
- Website: www.bad-sulza.de

Flurstedt (German pronunciation: [ˈfluːɐ̯ʃtɛt]) is a village and a former municipality in the Weimarer Land district of Thuringia, Germany. Since 1 January 2013, it is part of the town Bad Sulza.
