= Johann Joachim Christoph Bode =

German translator (1731–1793)

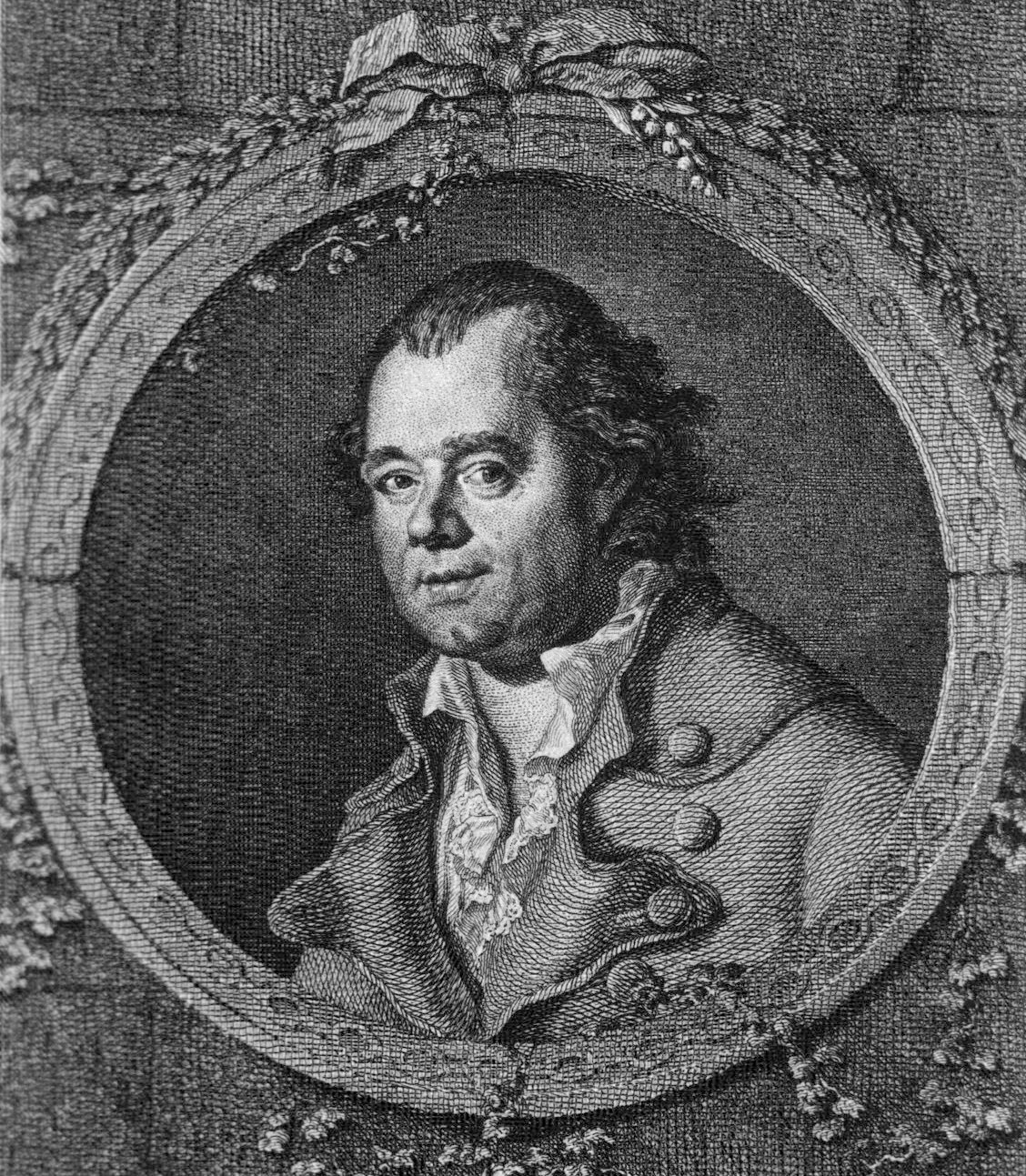
Johann Joachim Christoph Bode by Johann Ernst Heinsius

Johann Joachim Christoph Bode (January 16, 1731 – December 13, 1793) was a well-known German translator of literary works.

== Life ==
Bode was born in Braunschweig, the son of a poor day laborer from Schöppenstedt, and went as a shepherd boy to his grandfather in Barum. From 1745 he studied music in Braunschweig, and in 1750 became an oboist in an ensemble there. He continued his music studies at the University of Helmstedt, where he also learned French and English. In 1752, he composed a number of works in Hannover, where he also began to write.

At the death of his wife in 1757, Bode went to Hamburg, where he worked as a language and music teacher, and also began to translate works from French and English to German. He worked for the Kochsche Theater, and from 1762 to 1763 edited the Hamburgischen Korrespondenten. By a second marriage to a rich pupil (Simonette Tam), he came into the possession of a large fortune. When she died after several years, he married a third time, to the widow of a bookseller, with whom he established a printing business, and in connection with Gotthold Ephraim Lessing, a scholarly bookstore. This store sold its own and other works, including Lessing's Dramaturgie, Goethe's Götz, and Klopstock's Oden, but the venture soon failed, taking much of Bode's fortune with it.

In 1778 Bode moved to Weimar, where he served as chief clerk and court counselor to the countess of Bernstorff, the widow of Andreas Peter Bernstorff.

Member and Past Master of Lodge Absalem at Hamburg. Served as deputy grand master of the Grand Lodge of Hamburg. In 1782, he opted for a radical interpretation of Enlightenment and broke with the Christian mysticism embodied by Jean-Baptiste Willermoz. He met Adolph Knigge, a member of Illuminati, which he joined, acquiring the rank of Major illumitatus in January 1783. After the order was banned in Bavaria in 1784, he became the de facto chief executive officer, following Knigge's resignation and Weishaupt's flight.

He then participated in the controversy that raged in Germany following rumors of the conversion to Catholicism of the Protestant German prince and the anti-Papist reactions that followed. In 1787 he went to France, Strasbourg and Paris, where he met members of the Lodge of Philalèthes. According to his travel journal, some of them comprised a secret core, the "Philadelphians", in the manner of the Illuminati.

He died in Weimar in 1793.

== Translations ==
Bode's translations had a significant influence on German literature, making many notable foreign works available in German for the first time. Among his best known were:

- Laurence Sterne's A Sentimental Journey, as Yoriks empfindsame Reise (1768)
- Laurence Sterne's Tristram Shandy, as Tristram Shandys Leben (1774)
- Oliver Goldsmith's The Vicar of Wakefield, as Dorfprediger von Wakefield (1776)
- Henry Fielding's Tom Jones (1786–88)
