= Zaks (surname) =

Zaks is a surname. Among Jews, it can be a variant of the German surname, Sachs, the patronymic variant of the Hebrew biblical male personal name Yitzchak/Isaac or it can originate in the acronym surname Za'Ks, which stands for the Hebrew words, Zera Kodesh Shemo, literally meaning "his name is Holy Seed," a quotation from Isaiah 6:13 and implying "his name descends from martyrs." This acronym can also refer to the town of martyrdom, such as Speyer or Stendal, indicating a holy martyr from such a town. Notable people with the surname include:

- Amram Zaks (1926–2012), Israeli Rosh yeshiva
- Hillel Zaks (1931-2015), Israeli Rosh yeshiva
- Jerry Zaks (born 1946), German actor
- Mendel Zaks (1898–1974), American rabbi
- Rodnay Zaks (born 1946), American author
- Shmuel Zaks (born 1949), Israeli scientist

== See also ==
- Gordon Zacks
- Sachs
- Sacks (surname)
- Saks (disambiguation)
- Sax (disambiguation)
- Saxe (disambiguation)
- Zaks (disambiguation)
- Zax (disambiguation)
