= Saxe (surname) =

Saxe is a surname. Notable people with the surname include:

- Adrian Saxe (born 1943), American ceramist
- David B. Saxe (born 1942), American judge
- David Saxe (born 1969), American theatrical producer
- Edward Saxe (1916–2002), War intelligence, CBS executive, MOMA director, and New York Harvard Club President
- John Godfrey Saxe (1816–1887), American poet
- John Godfrey Saxe II (1877–1953), American politician
- John Theodore Saxe (1843–1881), of Albany Academy
- JP Saxe (born 1993), Canadian singer
- Karen Saxe, American mathematician
- Martin Saxe (1874–1967), New York politician
- Maurice de Saxe (1696–1750), military figure, Marshal General of France
- Melinda Saxe (born 1965), American magician
- Rebecca Saxe, MIT neuroscientist
- Susan Edith Saxe (born 1949), one of the FBI's Ten Most Wanted Fugitives in the first half of the 1970s

== See also ==
- Sax (surname)
- Sachs
- Sacks (surname)
- Saks (surname)
