= Zaks (disambiguation) =

Zaks are a construction toy.

Zaks may also refer to:

- Zaks (surname)
- Zak's, a bus company in England
- "The Zaks", the first published name for the Dr. Seuss story "The Zax"

== See also ==
- Zacks
- Sachs
- Sachse (disambiguation)
- Sacks (surname)
- Saks (disambiguation)
- Sax (disambiguation)
- Saxe (disambiguation)
- Small-angle X-ray scattering (SAXS)
- Zax (disambiguation)
