= Zax =

Zax may refer to:

- Andy Zax (active since c. 1999), music producer, historian, and information archivist
- "The Zax", a story by Dr. Seuss
- Zax (Duke Power), a cartoon character used to educate children
- Zax (tool), used for pruning slate roofing tiles
- Zax: The Alien Hunter, a video game
- Zax, a flying robot from the movie Benji, Zax & the Alien Prince

== See also ==
- Zaks (disambiguation)
- Gordon Zacks
- Sachs
- Sachse (disambiguation)
- Sacks (surname)
- Saks (disambiguation)
- Sax (disambiguation)
- Saxe (disambiguation)
- Small-angle X-ray scattering (SAXS)
- Zzzax, a comic book character
- Zaxbys, a chicken finger restaurant headquartered in Athens, Georgia
