= Saks =

Saks can refer to:

- Saks (surname)
- Saks, Alabama, a community in the United States
- Saks Global, holding company of Saks Fifth Avenue, Bergdorf Goodman, and Neiman Marcus
- Saks Fifth Avenue, U.S. luxury department store

== See also ==
- Sachs
- Sachse (disambiguation)
- Sacks (surname)
- Sax (disambiguation)
- Saxe (disambiguation)
- Small-angle X-ray scattering (SAXS)
- Zaks (disambiguation)
- Zax (disambiguation)
