= Saks (surname) =

Origin
- Meaning: One from Saxony
- Region of origin: Saxony

Other names
- Variant forms: Sachsen, Sachs, Sacks, Saksida, Sax, Saxe

Saks is a German and Estonian surname, meaning a person from the region of Saxony (originally Sachsen). The region is named after the Germanic tribe which settled there in Roman times. The name may refer to:

== People ==
- Adam Saks (born 1974), Danish painter
- Andrew Saks (1847–1912), American businessman
- Elyn Saks (born 1956), American legal scholar
- Gene Saks (1921–2015), American film director and actor
- Gidon Saks (born 1960), South African singer
- Ita Saks (1921–2003), Estonian translator and journalist
- Kaido Saks (born 1986), Estonian basketball player
- Katrin Saks (born 1956), Estonian politician
- Michael Saks (mathematician) (born 1951), American mathematician
- Michael J. Saks (born 1947), American legal scholar
- Sol Saks (1910–2011), American screenwriter
- Stanislaw Saks (1897–1942), Polish mathematician
- Tarmo Saks (born 1975), Estonian football player
- Toby Saks (1942–2013), American cellist
- Ya'ara Saks (born 1973), Canadian politician

== See also ==
- Sachs
- Sacks (surname)
- Sax (surname)
- Saxe (surname)
