= Statewide opinion polling for the January 2012 Republican Party presidential primaries =

Republican presidential primaries, 2012
← 2008	Early – Mid 2012	2016 →
- Leading Republican 2012 primary candidate by state (parentheses indicate a shared lead, italics indicates polling data, non-italics indicates a primary win). Stars indicate a completed primary. States in gray have no polling data or no relevant data due to a leading candidate having withdrawn or declined to enter the race. Mitt Romney 37+5 Rick Santorum 11 Newt Gingrich 2
Republican nominee before election
John McCain
Republican
Presumptive Republican nominee
Mitt Romney
Republican

This article contains opinion polling by U.S. state for the 2012 Republican Party presidential primaries.

As of May 2012, both Ron Paul and Mitt Romney have led polls in multiple states. They have both also reached at least 20 percent in polls in multiple states. Before announcing that they would not run, Mike Huckabee and Sarah Palin were also leading polls in multiple states with numbers above 20 percent. Michele Bachmann, Herman Cain, Rick Perry, and Rick Santorum were also able to lead polls in multiple states earlier in the race, but Cain suspended his campaign on December 3 after multiple allegations of sexual impropriety, Bachmann dropped out on January 4, one day after her poor showing in the Iowa caucuses, in which she came in sixth place and received just 5 percent of the vote, Perry dropped out on January 19 after finishing fifth in Iowa with just over 10 percent of the vote, finishing sixth in New Hampshire with less than 1 percent of the vote and with "lagging" poll numbers ahead of the South Carolina primary, and Santorum suspended his campaign on April 10. Newt Gingrich announced he would drop out of the race after a poor showing in the northeast on April 24.

Haley Barbour of Mississippi, Jeb Bush of Florida, Chris Christie of New Jersey, Jim DeMint of South Carolina, Bobby Jindal of Louisiana, Tim Pawlenty of Minnesota, Paul Ryan of Wisconsin and John Thune of South Dakota all succeeded in leading polls in their home states at some point in 2011, although only Pawlenty actually launched a campaign. Pawlenty exited the race on August 14, one day after finishing third in Iowa's Ames Straw Poll, citing a lack of campaign funds.

== Polling for completed primaries ==
=== Iowa (January 3) ===
Winner: Rick Santorum
Caucus date: January 3, 2012
Delegates: 28

Poll source	Date	1st	2nd	3rd	Other
Caucus results Turnout: 122,255	Jan. 3, 2012	Rick Santorum; 24.6%	Mitt Romney; 24.5%	Ron Paul; 21.5%	Newt Gingrich 13.3%, Rick Perry 10.3%, Michele Bachmann 5.0%, Jon Huntsman 0.6%, No Preference 0.1%, Other 0.1%, Herman Cain 0.1%, Buddy Roemer 0.0%
InsiderAdvantage /Majority Opinion Research Sample size: 729	Jan. 1, 2012	Mitt Romney; 22.7%	Ron Paul; 22.4%	Rick Santorum; 18%	Newt Gingrich 16.1%, Rick Perry 9.6%, Michele Bachmann 5.8%, Jon Huntsman 1.8%, Someone Else 1.3%, No Opinion 2.3%
Public Policy Polling Margin of error: ±2.7% Sample size: 1,340	Dec. 31, 2011 – Jan. 1, 2012	Ron Paul; 20%	Mitt Romney; 19%	Rick Santorum; 18%	Newt Gingrich 14%, Rick Perry 10%, Michele Bachmann 8%, Jon Huntsman 4%, Buddy Roemer 2%, Other 4%
American Research Group Margin of error: 4% Sample size: 600	Dec. 29 – Jan. 1, 2012	Mitt Romney; 22%	Ron Paul; 17%	Rick Santorum; 16%	Newt Gingrich 15%, Rick Perry 9%, Michele Bachmann 8%, Jon Huntsman 4%, Buddy Roemer 1%, Someone Else 1%, Undecided 7%
Des Moines Register Margin of error: ±4% Sample size: 602	Dec. 27–30, 2011	Mitt Romney; 24%	Ron Paul; 22%	Rick Santorum; 15%	Newt Gingrich 12%, Rick Perry 11%, Michele Bachmann 7%, Jon Huntsman 2%
We Ask America Margin of error: Sample size: 889	Dec. 29, 2011	Mitt Romney; 24%	Rick Santorum; 17%	Ron Paul; 14%	Newt Gingrich 13%, Michele Bachmann 12%, Rick Perry 10%, Jon Huntsman 4%, Undecided 7%
InsiderAdvantage /Majority Opinion Research Margin of error: ±4.7% Sample size: 429	Dec. 28, 2011	Ron Paul; 17.3%	Mitt Romney; 17.2%	Newt Gingrich; 16.7%	Rick Santorum 13.4%, Michele Bachmann 11.8%, Rick Perry 10.5%, Jon Huntsman 2.8%, Someone else 3%, no opinion 7.3%
Rasmussen Margin of error: ±4% Sample size: 750	Dec. 28, 2011	Mitt Romney; 23%	Ron Paul; 22%	Rick Santorum; 16%	Newt Gingrich 13%, Rick Perry 13%, Michele Bachmann 5%, Jon Huntsman 3%, Someone else 1%, Undecided 6%
NBC News/Marist Margin of error: ±4.7% Sample size: 433	Dec. 27–28, 2011	Mitt Romney; 23%	Ron Paul; 21%	Rick Santorum; 15%	Rick Perry 14%, Newt Gingrich 13%, Michele Bachmann 6%, Jon Huntsman 2%, Undecided 7%
American Research Group Margin of error: ±4% Sample size: 600	Dec. 26–28, 2011	Mitt Romney; 22%	Newt Gingrich; 17%	Ron Paul; 16%	Rick Santorum 11%, Rick Perry 9%, Michele Bachmann 8%, Jon Huntsman 6%, Buddy Roemer 1%
Public Policy Polling Margin of error: ±4.1% Sample size: 565	Dec. 26–27, 2011	Ron Paul; 24%	Mitt Romney; 20%	Newt Gingrich; 13%	Michele Bachmann 11%, Rick Perry 10%, Rick Santorum 10%, Jon Huntsman 4%, Buddy Roemer 2%, Someone else/Not sure 5%
CNN/Time Magazine Margin of error: ±4.5% Sample size: 452	Dec. 21–27, 2011	Mitt Romney; 25%	Ron Paul; 22%	Rick Santorum; 16%	Newt Gingrich 14%, Rick Perry 11%, Michele Bachmann 9%, Jon Huntsman 1%, No opinion 2%
American Research Group Margin of error: ±4% Sample size: 600	Dec. 19–22, 2011	Ron Paul; 21%	Mitt Romney; 20%	Newt Gingrich; 19%	Rick Perry 9%, Michele Bachmann 8%, Jon Huntsman 6%, Rick Santorum 4%, Buddy Roemer 1%
We Ask America Margin of error: ±2.8% Sample size: 1,250	Dec. 20, 2011	Ron Paul; 19%	Mitt Romney; 18%	Newt Gingrich; 16%	Michele Bachmann 15%, Rick Perry 11%, Rick Santorum 9%, Jon Huntsman 4%, Uncertain 8%
Rasmussen Reports Margin of error: ±4% Sample size: 750	Dec. 19, 2011	Mitt Romney; 25%	Ron Paul; 20%	Newt Gingrich; 17%	Rick Perry 10%, Rick Santorum 10%, Michele Bachmann 6%, Jon Huntsman 4%, Not sure 8%, Other 1%
InsiderAdvantage /Majority Opinion Research Margin of error: ±5.7% Sample size: 391	Dec. 18, 2011	Ron Paul; 23.9%	Mitt Romney; 18.2%	Rick Perry; 15.5%	Newt Gingrich 12.9%, Michele Bachmann 10.1%, Jon Huntsman 3.8%, Rick Santorum 2.9%, Someone else 0.8%, No opinion 11.9%
Public Policy Polling Margin of error: ±4% Sample size: 597	Dec. 16–18, 2011	Ron Paul; 23%	Mitt Romney; 20%	Newt Gingrich; 14%	Michele Bachmann 10%, Rick Perry 10%, Rick Santorum 10%, Jon Huntsman 4%, Gary Johnson 2%, Someone else/not sure 7%
Iowa State University /Cedar Rapids Gazette /KCRG Margin of error: ±5% Sample size: 940	Dec. 8–18, 2011	Ron Paul; 27.5%	Newt Gingrich; 25.3%	Mitt Romney; 17.5%	Rick Perry 11.2%, Michele Bachmann 7.4%, Rick Santorum 4.9%, Herman Cain 0.4%, Jon Huntsman 0.3%, Can't decide 5.4%
Rasmussen Margin of error: ±4% Sample size: 750	Dec. 13, 2011	Mitt Romney; 23%	Newt Gingrich; 20%	Ron Paul; 18%	Rick Perry 10%, Michele Bachmann 9%, Rick Santorum 6%, Jon Huntsman 5%, Not sure 8%, Other 2%
Public Policy Polling Margin of error: ±4.2% Sample size: 555	Dec. 11–13, 2011	Newt Gingrich; 22%	Ron Paul; 21%	Mitt Romney; 16%	Michele Bachmann 11%, Rick Perry 9%, Rick Santorum 8%, Jon Huntsman 5%, Gary Johnson 1%, Someone else/Not sure 7%
InsiderAdvantage /Majority Opinion Research Margin of error: Sample size: 517	Dec. 12, 2011	Newt Gingrich; 27.1%	Ron Paul; 16.5%	Rick Perry; 13.2%	Mitt Romney 11.9%, Michele Bachmann 10.3%, Rick Santorum 6.8%, Jon Huntsman 3.6%, Someone else 1.4%, No opinion 9.2%
American Research Group Margin of error: ±4% Sample size: 600	Dec. 8–11, 2011	Newt Gingrich; 22%	Ron Paul; 17%	Mitt Romney; 17%	Rick Perry 13%, Michele Bachmann 7%, Rick Santorum 7%, Jon Huntsman 5%, Other 1%, Undecided 12%
University of Iowa Hawkeye Margin of error: ±6% Sample size: 277	Nov. 30 – Dec. 7, 2011	Newt Gingrich; 29.8%	Mitt Romney; 20.3%	Ron Paul; 10.7%	Michele Bachmann 8.5%, Rick Perry 8.2%, Rick Santorum 5.3%, Herman Cain 4.4%, Jon Huntsman 1.5%, Someone else 0.9%, Don't know/refused 10.5%
CNN /Time Magazine Margin of error: ±5% Sample size: 419	Nov. 29 – Dec. 6, 2011	Newt Gingrich; 33%	Mitt Romney; 20%	Ron Paul; 17%	Rick Perry 9%, Michele Bachmann 7%, Rick Santorum 5%, Jon Huntsman 1%, None 2%, No Opinion 5%
CBS News /New York Times Margin of error: ±4% Sample size: 1,869	Nov. 30 – Dec. 5, 2011	Newt Gingrich; 31%	Mitt Romney; 17%	Ron Paul; 16%	Rick Perry 11%, Michele Bachmann 9%, Rick Santorum 4%, Jon Huntsman 1%
CBS News /New York Times Margin of error: ±4% Sample size: 1,869	Nov. 30 – Dec. 5, 2011	Newt Gingrich; 28%	Mitt Romney; 18%	Ron Paul; 14%	Rick Perry 10%, Herman Cain 7%, Michele Bachmann 4%, Rick Santorum 4%, Jon Huntsman 1%, someone else 1%, undecided 10%, no/no one 1%, don't know/no answer 2%
Public Policy Polling Margin of error: ±4.1% Sample size: 572	Dec. 3–5, 2011	Newt Gingrich; 27%	Ron Paul; 18%	Mitt Romney; 16%	Michele Bachmann 13%, Rick Perry 9%, Rick Santorum 6%, Jon Huntsman 4%, Gary Johnson 1%, Someone else/Not sure 7%
We Ask America Margin of error: ±3.15% Sample size: 970	Dec. 5, 2011	Newt Gingrich; 30%	Mitt Romney; 16%	Ron Paul; 14%	Michele Bachmann 13%, Rick Perry 7%, Rick Santorum 4%, Jon Huntsman 3%, someone else 1%, undecided 6%, no/no one 2%, don't know/no answer 2%
ABC News/Washington Post Margin of error: ±6% Sample size: 356	Nov. 30 – Dec. 4, 2011	Newt Gingrich; 33%	Ron Paul; 18%	Mitt Romney; 18%	Rick Perry 11%, Michele Bachmann 8%, Rick Santorum 7%, Jon Huntsman 2%, None of these 1%, Would not vote 0%, No opinion 3%
The Des Moines Register Margin of error: ±4.9% Sample size: 401	Nov. 27–30, 2011	Newt Gingrich; 25%	Ron Paul; 18%	Mitt Romney; 16%	Michele Bachmann 8%, Herman Cain 8%, Rick Perry 6%, Rick Santorum 6%, Jon Huntsman 2%, Uncommitted 11%
NBC News/Marist Margin of error: ±4.8% Sample size: 425 (Likely caucus-goers)	Nov. 27–29, 2011	Newt Gingrich; 26%	Mitt Romney; 18%	Ron Paul; 17%	Herman Cain 9%, Rick Perry 9%, Michele Bachmann 5%, Rick Santorum 5%, Jon Huntsman 2%, Undecided 9%
NBC News/Marist Margin of error: ±4.8% Sample size: 425 (Likely caucus-goers)	Nov. 27–29, 2011	Newt Gingrich; 28%	Ron Paul; 19%	Mitt Romney; 19%	Rick Perry 10%, Michele Bachmann 7%, Rick Santorum 6%, Jon Huntsman 2%, Undecided 9%
NBC News/Marist Margin of error: ±3.2% Sample size: 916 (Potential caucus-goers)	Nov. 27–29, 2011	Newt Gingrich; 25%	Mitt Romney; 18%	Ron Paul; 16%	Herman Cain 9%, Rick Perry 9%, Michele Bachmann 5%, Rick Santorum 4%, Jon Huntsman 2%, Undecided 11%
We Ask America Margin of error: ±3.16% Sample size: 962	Nov. 28, 2011	Newt Gingrich; 29%	Michele Bachmann; 13%	Mitt Romney; 13%	Ron Paul 11%, Herman Cain 7%, Rick Perry 5%, Rick Santorum 5%, Jon Huntsman 4%, Uncertain 13%
American Research Group Margin of error: ±4% Sample size: 600	Nov. 17–23, 2011	Newt Gingrich; 27%	Mitt Romney; 20%	Ron Paul; 16%	Michele Bachmann 6%, Herman Cain 6%, Rick Santorum 6%, Rick Perry 5%, Jon Huntsman 3% Undecided 11%
Rasmussen Reports Margin of error: ±4% Sample size: 800	Nov. 16, 2011	Newt Gingrich; 32%	Mitt Romney; 19%	Herman Cain; 13%	Ron Paul 10%, Michele Bachmann 6%, Rick Perry 6%, Rick Santorum 5%, Jon Huntsman 2%, Other 1%, Undecided 6%
Iowa State University /Gazette /KCRG Margin of error: ±5% Sample size: 1,256	Nov. 1–13, 2011	Herman Cain; 24.5%	Ron Paul; 20.4%	Mitt Romney; 16.3%	Rick Perry 7.9%, Michele Bachmann 7.6%, Newt Gingrich 4.8%, Rick Santorum 4.7%, Jon Huntsman 0%, Can't decide 8.1%
The Polling Company Margin of error: ±4.4% Sample size: 501	Nov. 11–13, 2011	Herman Cain; 20%	Newt Gingrich; 19%	Mitt Romney; 14%	Michele Bachmann 10%, Ron Paul 10%, Rick Perry 5%, Rick Santorum 4%, Jon Huntsman 2%, Gary Johnson 1%, Refused 1%, Undecided 13%
Bloomberg News Margin of error: ±4.4% Sample size: 503	Nov. 10–12, 2011	Herman Cain; 20%	Ron Paul; 19%	Mitt Romney; 18%	Newt Gingrich 17%, Rick Perry 7%, Michele Bachmann 5%, Rick Santorum 3%, Jon Huntsman 1%, Not sure 10%
We Ask America Margin of error: ±3.33% Sample size: 864	Nov. 6, 2011	Herman Cain; 22%	Newt Gingrich; 18%	Mitt Romney; 15%	Michele Bachmann 11%, Ron Paul 11%, Rick Perry 4%, Rick Santorum 3%, Jon Huntsman 2%, Other 14%
JMC Enterprises Margin of error: ±4.3% Sample size: 510	Nov. 2, 2011	Herman Cain; 20%	Mitt Romney; 20%	Newt Gingrich; 16%	Michele Bachmann 6%, Ron Paul 6%, Rick Perry 4%, Rick Santorum 4%, Jon Huntsman 2%, Undecided 23%
The Des Moines Register Margin of error: ±4.9% Sample size: 400	Oct. 23–26, 2011	Herman Cain; 23%	Mitt Romney; 21%	Ron Paul; 12%	Michele Bachmann 8%, Newt Gingrich 7%, Rick Perry 7%, Rick Santorum 5%, Jon Huntsman 1%
CNN/Time Magazine Margin of error: ±5% Sample size: 405	Oct. 20–25, 2011	Mitt Romney; 24%	Herman Cain; 21%	Ron Paul; 12%	Newt Gingrich 10%, Rick Perry 10%, Michele Bachmann 6%, Rick Santorum 2%, Jon Huntsman 1%, None 3%, No opinion 11%
University of Iowa, Hawkeye Margin of error: ±3.6% Sample size: 778	Oct. 21, 2011	Herman Cain; 37.0%	Mitt Romney; 27.0%	Ron Paul; 11.5%	Newt Gingrich 7.7%, Rick Perry 5.9%, Michele Bachmann 3.9%, Rick Santorum 3.1%, Jon Huntsman 1.2%, Someone else 2.5%
Rasmussen Reports Margin of error: ±4% Sample size: 800	Oct. 19, 2011	Herman Cain; 28%	Mitt Romney; 21%	Ron Paul; 10%	Newt Gingrich 9%, Michele Bachmann 8%, Rick Perry 7%, Rick Santorum 4%, Jon Huntsman 2%, Someone else/Not sure 12%
AARP/GS Strategy Group Margin of error: ±4.9% Sample size: 400	Oct. 17–18, 2011	Herman Cain; 25%	Mitt Romney; 22%	Ron Paul; 8%	Michele Bachmann 7%, Newt Gingrich 6%, Rick Perry 5%, Rick Santorum 4%, Jon Huntsman 1%, No opinion 23%
Public Policy Polling Margin of error: ±5.6% Sample size: 311	Oct. 7–10, 2011	Herman Cain; 30%	Mitt Romney; 22%	Ron Paul; 10%	Rick Perry 9%, Michele Bachmann 8%, Newt Gingrich 8%, Rick Santorum 5%, Jon Huntsman 1%, Gary Johnson 1%, Someone else/Not sure 5%
NBC News-Marist Poll Margin of error: ±5.1% Sample size: 371	Oct. 3–5, 2011	Mitt Romney; 26%	Herman Cain; 20%	Ron Paul; 12%	Michele Bachmann 11%, Rick Perry 11%, Newt Gingrich 5%, Rick Santorum 3%, Jon Huntsman 1%, Gary Johnson 1%, Undecided 16%
American Research Group Margin of error: ±4% Sample size: 600	Sep. 22–27, 2011	Mitt Romney; 21%	Michele Bachmann; 15%	Rick Perry; 14%	Ron Paul 12%, Newt Gingrich 8%, Herman Cain 6%, Sarah Palin 4%, Rick Santorum 2%, Jon Huntsman 1%, Buddy Roemer 1%, Other 1%, Undecided 15%
Rasmussen Reports Margin of error: ±3% Sample size: 862	Aug. 31, 2011	Rick Perry; 29%	Michele Bachmann; 18%	Mitt Romney; 17%	Ron Paul 14%, Herman Cain 4%, Rick Santorum 4%, Jon Huntsman 3%, Newt Gingrich 2%
Magellan Strategies Margin of error: ±3.77% Sample size: 676	Aug. 22–23, 2011	Rick Perry; 24%	Michele Bachmann; 22%	Mitt Romney; 19%	Ron Paul 9%, Herman Cain 6%, Newt Gingrich 4%, Rick Santorum 4%, Jon Huntsman 1%, other candidate 3%, undecided 8%
WPA Research Margin of error: ±4.9% Sample size: 402	Aug. 21–22, 2011	Rick Perry; 23%	Michele Bachmann; 20%	Mitt Romney; 16%	Ron Paul 9%, Herman Cain 8%, Rick Santorum 7%, Newt Gingrich 3%, Jon Huntsman 2%, Thaddeus McCotter 0%
Public Policy Polling Margin of error: ±5.5% Sample size: 317	Aug. 19–21, 2011	Rick Perry; 21%	Mitt Romney; 18%	Michele Bachmann; 15%	Ron Paul 12%, Sarah Palin 10%, Newt Gingrich 7%, Herman Cain 6%, Rick Santorum 5%, Jon Huntsman 3%, someone else/not sure 4%
Public Policy Polling Margin of error: ±5.5% Sample size: 317	Aug. 19–21, 2011	Rick Perry; 20%	Michele Bachmann; 18%	Mitt Romney; 15%	Ron Paul 14%, Paul Ryan 9%, Herman Cain 7%, Newt Gingrich 7%, Rick Santorum 5%, Jon Huntsman 3%, someone else/not sure 5%
Public Policy Polling Margin of error: ±5.5% Sample size: 317	Aug. 19–21, 2011	Rick Perry; 22%	Mitt Romney; 19%	Michele Bachmann; 18%	Ron Paul 16%, Herman Cain 7%, Newt Gingrich 5%, Rick Santorum 5%, Jon Huntsman 3%, someone else/not sure 5%
Public Policy Polling Margin of error: ±5.5% Sample size: 317	Aug. 19–21, 2011	Rick Perry; 34%	Mitt Romney; 28%	Michele Bachmann; 24%	not sure 14%
Public Policy Polling Margin of error: ±5.5% Sample size: 317	Aug. 19–21, 2011	Michele Bachmann; 44%	Mitt Romney; 42%	–	not sure 14%
Public Policy Polling Margin of error: ±5.5% Sample size: 317	Aug. 19–21, 2011	Rick Perry; 48%	Mitt Romney; 30%	–	not sure 22%
Public Policy Polling Margin of error: ±5.5% Sample size: 317	Aug. 19–21, 2011	Rick Perry; 51%	Michele Bachmann; 27%	–	not sure 20%
We Ask America Polls Margin of error: ±3% Sample size: 649	Aug. 16, 2011	Rick Perry; 29%	Michele Bachmann; 17%	Mitt Romney; 15%	Ron Paul 8%, Sarah Palin 7%, Herman Cain 5%, Newt Gingrich 5%, Rick Santorum 4%, None of these 9%
Rasmussen Margin of error: ±4% Sample size: 627	Aug. 4, 2011	Michele Bachmann; 22%	Mitt Romney; 21%	Ron Paul; 16%	Rick Perry 12%, Tim Pawlenty 11%, Newt Gingrich 5%, Herman Cain 4%, Jon Huntsman 2%, Some other candidate 7%
Magellan Margin of error: ±3.1% Sample size: 1,024	Jul. 10–11, 2011	Michele Bachmann; 29%	Mitt Romney; 16%	Herman Cain; 8%	Tim Pawlenty 8%, Newt Gingrich 5%, Ron Paul 5%, Rick Santorum 3%, Some other candidate 2%, Undecided 24%
American Research Group Margin of error: ±4% Sample size: 600	Jul. 5–11, 2011	Michele Bachmann; 21%	Mitt Romney; 18%	Ron Paul; 14%	Sarah Palin 11%, Newt Gingrich 8%, Rick Santorum 5%, Jon Huntsman 3%, Herman Cain 2%, Rudy Giuliani 2%, Tim Pawlenty 2%, Rick Perry 2%, Other 2%
Mason-Dixon Polling Margin of error: ±3.9% Sample size: 629	Jul. 5–7, 2011	Michele Bachmann; 32%	Mitt Romney; 29%	Tim Pawlenty; 7%	Rick Santorum 6%, Ron Paul 3%, Newt Gingrich 2%, Herman Cain 1%
The Iowa Republican Margin of error: ±4.4% Sample size: 500	Jun. 26–30, 2011	Michele Bachmann; 25%	Mitt Romney; 21%	Herman Cain; 9%	Tim Pawlenty 9%, Ron Paul 6%, Newt Gingrich 4%, Rick Santorum 2%, Jon Huntsman 1%
Des Moines Register Margin of error: ±4.9% Sample size: 400	Jun. 19–22, 2011	Mitt Romney; 23%	Michele Bachmann; 22%	Herman Cain; 10%	Newt Gingrich 7%, Ron Paul 7%, Tim Pawlenty 6%, Rick Santorum 4%, Jon Huntsman 2%
Public Policy Polling Margin of error: ±4.5% Sample size: 481	May 27–30, 2011	Mitt Romney; 21%	Herman Cain; 15%	Sarah Palin; 15%	Newt Gingrich 12%, Michele Bachmann 11%, Tim Pawlenty 10%, Ron Paul 8%, Jon Huntsman 0%
Public Policy Polling Margin of error: ±4.8% Sample size: 419	Apr. 15–17, 2011	Mike Huckabee; 27%	Mitt Romney; 16%	Donald Trump; 14%	Newt Gingrich 9%, Sarah Palin 8%, Michele Bachmann 6%, Ron Paul 6%, Tim Pawlenty 5%, someone else/undecided 9%
Public Policy Polling Margin of error: ±4.8% Sample size: 419	Apr. 15–17, 2011	Mike Huckabee; 30%	Mitt Romney; 18%	Newt Gingrich; 12%	Sarah Palin 12%, Tim Pawlenty 7%, Michele Bachmann 6%, Ron Paul 6%, someone else/undecided 10%
Public Policy Polling Margin of error: ±4.8% Sample size: 419	Apr. 15–17, 2011	Mitt Romney; 25%	Newt Gingrich; 15%	Sarah Palin; 15%	Ron Paul 15%, Michele Bachmann 10%, Tim Pawlenty 9%, someone else/undecided 11%
Public Policy Polling Margin of error: ±4.8% Sample size: 419	Apr. 15–17, 2011	Mike Huckabee; 33%	Mitt Romney; 20%	Newt Gingrich; 13%	Michele Bachmann 10%, Ron Paul 9%, Tim Pawlenty 5%, someone else/undecided 10%
Public Policy Polling Margin of error: ±4.8% Sample size: 419	Apr. 15–17, 2011	Mitt Romney; 28%	Newt Gingrich; 19%	Ron Paul; 16%	Michele Bachmann 15%, Tim Pawlenty 9%, someone else/undecided 12%
Strategic National Margin of error: ±4.8% Sample size: 410	Jan. 18, 2011	Mike Huckabee; 28%	Mitt Romney; 19%	Newt Gingrich; 12%	Sarah Palin 12%, Michele Bachmann 4%, Tim Pawlenty 4%, John Thune 2%, Rick Santorum 1%, Haley Barbour 0%, undecided 18%
Public Policy Polling Margin of error: ±4.4% Sample size: 494	Jan. 7–9, 2011	Mike Huckabee; 30%	Mitt Romney; 18%	Sarah Palin; 15%	Newt Gingrich 13%, Ron Paul 6%, Tim Pawlenty 4%, John Thune 3%, Mitch Daniels 1%, undecided 10%
Neighborhood Research	Jan. 3–8, 2011	Mike Huckabee; 24%	Mitt Romney; 19%	Sarah Palin; 11%	Newt Gingrich 8%, Tim Pawlenty 4%, Ron Paul 3%, Michele Bachmann 2%, Haley Barbour 1%, Mike Pence 1%
Voter Consumer Research Margin of error: ±4.91% Sample size: 399	Jul. 25–28, 2010	Mike Huckabee; 22%	Mitt Romney; 18%	Newt Gingrich; 14%	Sarah Palin 11%, Ron Paul 5%, Tim Pawlenty 1%, Rick Santorum >1%, John Thune 1%, Haley Barbour 0%, Rick Perry 0%, undecided 23%
Public Policy Polling Margin of error: ±4.5% Sample size: 477	May 25–27, 2010	Mike Huckabee; 27%	Sarah Palin; 17%	Newt Gingrich; 16%	Mitt Romney 15%, Ron Paul 7%, Jim DeMint 2%, John Thune 2%, other candidate 3%, undecided 11%
Race42012.com /Right Way Marketing Margin of error: ±5.66% Sample size: 300	Mar. 4, 2010	Mike Huckabee; 17%	Mitt Romney; 14%	Sarah Palin; 11%	Tim Pawlenty 1%, Gary Johnson <1%, undecided 57%

=== New Hampshire (January 10) ===
Winner: Mitt Romney
Primary date: January 10, 2012
Delegates: 12

Poll source	Date	1st	2nd	3rd	Other
Primary results Turnout: 248,485	Jan. 10, 2012	Mitt Romney; 39.3%	Ron Paul; 22.9%	Jon Huntsman; 16.9%	Newt Gingrich 9.4%, Rick Santorum 9.4%, Rick Perry 0.7%, Buddy Roemer 0.4%, write-ins 0.3%, Michele Bachmann 0.1%, Fred Karger 0.1%, Kevin Rubash 0.1%, Gary Johnson 0.1%, Herman Cain 0.1%, Jeff Lawman 0.1%, other 0.2%
Suffolk University/7 News Margin of error: ± 4.4% Sample size: 500	Jan. 8–9, 2012	Mitt Romney; 37%	Ron Paul; 18%	Jon Huntsman; 16%	Rick Santorum 11%, Newt Gingrich 9%, Buddy Roemer 1%, Rick Perry 1%, Fred Karger 0%, Undecided 7%
American Research Group Margin of error: ± 4.4% Sample size: 600	Jan. 8–9, 2012	Mitt Romney; 37%	Jon Huntsman; 18%	Ron Paul; 17%	Rick Santorum 11%, Newt Gingrich 10%, Rick Perry 1%, Other 2%, Undecided 4%
Suffolk University/7 News Margin of error: ± 4.4% Sample size: 500	Jan. 7–8, 2012	Mitt Romney; 33%	Ron Paul; 20%	Jon Huntsman; 13%	Newt Gingrich 11%, Rick Santorum 10%, Buddy Roemer 2%, Rick Perry 1%, Undecided 12%
Public Policy Polling Margin of error: ± 2.3% Sample size: 1,771	Jan. 7–8, 2012	Mitt Romney; 35%	Ron Paul; 18%	Jon Huntsman; 16%	Newt Gingrich 12%, Rick Santorum 11%, Buddy Roemer 3%, Rick Perry 1%, Someone else/Not sure 4%
University of New Hampshire/WMUR Margin of error: ± 4.6% Sample size: 461	Jan. 5–8, 2012	Mitt Romney; 41%	Ron Paul; 17%	Jon Huntsman; 11%	Rick Santorum 11%, Newt Gingrich 8%, Michele Bachmann 1%, Rick Perry 1%, Buddy Roemer 1%, undecided 15%
Suffolk University/7 News Margin of error: ± 4.4% Sample size: 500	Jan. 6–7, 2012	Mitt Romney; 35%	Ron Paul; 20%	Jon Huntsman; 11%	Newt Gingrich 9%, Rick Santorum 8%, Buddy Roemer 1%, Rick Perry 1%, Fred Karger 0%, undecided 15%
American Research Group Margin of error ±4% Sample size: 600	Jan. 6–7, 2012	Mitt Romney; 40%	Jon Huntsman; 17%	Ron Paul; 16%	Rick Santorum 12%, Newt Gingrich 8%, Rick Perry 2%
Suffolk University/7 News Margin of error: ± 4.4% Sample size: 500	Jan. 5–6, 2012	Mitt Romney; 39%	Ron Paul; 17%	Newt Gingrich; 10%	Jon Huntsman 9%, Rick Santorum 9%, Rick Perry 1%, Buddy Roemer 0%, Fred Karger 0%, undecided 15%
Rasmussen Margin of error: ± 4% Sample size: 750	Jan. 5, 2012	Mitt Romney; 42%	Ron Paul; 18%	Rick Santorum; 13%	Jon Huntsman 12%, Newt Gingrich 8%, Rick Perry 1%, Someone else 1%, Undecided 6%
NBC News/Marist College Margin of error: ±3.7% Sample size: 711	Jan. 4–5, 2012	Mitt Romney; 44%	Ron Paul; 22%	Rick Santorum; 13%	Newt Gingrich 9%, Jon Huntsman 9%, Rick Perry 1%, Undecided 9%
Suffolk University/7 News Margin of error: ±4.4% Sample size: 500	Jan. 4–5, 2012	Mitt Romney; 40%	Ron Paul; 17%	Rick Santorum; 11%	Newt Gingrich 9%, Jon Huntsman 8%, Rick Perry 1%, Fred Karger 0%, Buddy Roemer 0%, Undecided 15%
University of New Hampshire/WMUR Margin of error: ± 3.9% Sample size: 631	Jan. 2–5, 2012	Mitt Romney; 44%	Ron Paul; 20%	Newt Gingrich; 8%	Rick Santorum 8%, Jon Huntsman 7%, Michele Bachmann 1%, Gary Johnson 1%, Rick Perry 1%, Buddy Roemer 1%, Fred Karger <1%, Andy Martin 0%, Not sure 10%
Watchdog.org/Pulse Opinion Research Margin of error: ± 3% Sample size: 865	Jan. 4, 2012	Mitt Romney; 37%	Ron Paul; 19%	Jon Huntsman; 16%	Rick Santorum 14%, Newt Gingrich 9%, Rick Perry <1%, Other <1%, Not sure 4%
The Washington Times/JZ Analytics Margin of error: ± 4.5% Sample size: 498	Jan. 4, 2012	Mitt Romney; 38%	Ron Paul; 24%	Rick Santorum; 11%	Newt Gingrich 9%, Jon Huntsman 8%, Rick Perry 1%, Not sure 10%
Suffolk University/7 News Margin of error: ±4.4% Sample size: 500	Jan. 3–4, 2012	Mitt Romney; 41%	Ron Paul; 18%	Rick Santorum; 8%	Newt Gingrich 7%, Jon Huntsman 7%, Buddy Roemer 1%, Michele Bachmann 1%, Fred Karger 0%, Rick Perry 0%, Undecided 17%
CNN/ORC Margin of error: ±4% Sample size: 554	Jan. 3, 2012	Mitt Romney; 47%	Ron Paul; 17%	Jon Huntsman; 13%	Rick Santorum 10%, Newt Gingrich 9%, Michele Bachmann 1%, Rick Perry 0%, Someone else 1%, None 1%, No Opinion 1%
Suffolk University/7 News Margin of error: ±4.4% Sample size: 500	Jan. 2–3, 2012	Mitt Romney; 43%	Ron Paul; 14%	Newt Gingrich; 9%	Jon Huntsman 7%, Rick Santorum 6%, Michele Bachmann 2%, Rick Perry 1%, Buddy Roemer 1%, Fred Karger 1%, Undecided 16%
Suffolk University/7 News Margin of error: ±4.4% Sample size: 500	Jan. 1–2, 2012	Mitt Romney; 43%	Ron Paul; 16%	Jon Huntsman; 10%	Newt Gingrich 9%, Rick Santorum 5%, Michele Bachmann 2%, Rick Perry 2%, Buddy Roemer 0%, Fred Karger 0%, Undecided 13%
Suffolk University/7 News Margin of error: ±4.4% Sample size: 500	Dec. 31, 2011 – Jan. 1, 2012	Mitt Romney; 43%	Ron Paul; 17%	Jon Huntsman; 9%	Newt Gingrich 8%, Rick Santorum 3%, Michele Bachmann 2%, Rick Perry 2%, Buddy Roemer 1%, Fred Karger 0%, Undecided 15%
Suffolk University/7 News Margin of error: ±4.4% Sample size: 500	Dec. 30–31, 2011	Mitt Romney; 41%	Ron Paul; 15%	Newt Gingrich; 11%	Jon Huntsman 9%, Michele Bachmann 3%, Rick Santorum 3%, Rick Perry 2%, Buddy Roemer 1%, Fred Karger 0%, Undecided 16%
Magellan Strategies/NH Journal Margin of error: ±3.85%	Dec. 27–28, 2011	Mitt Romney; 41%	Ron Paul; 21%	Newt Gingrich; 12%, Jon Huntsman; 12%	Rick Santorum 4%, Michele Bachmann 4%, Rick Perry 3%, Some other candidate 2%, Undecided 1%
Public Policy Polling Margin of error: ±3.4% Sample size: 830	Dec. 27–28, 2011	Mitt Romney; 36%	Ron Paul; 21%	Newt Gingrich; 13%	Jon Huntsman 12%, Michele Bachmann 7%, Rick Santorum 3%, Rick Perry 3%, Buddy Roemer 3%, Other 2%
Public Policy Polling Margin of error: ±3.4% Sample size: 830	Dec. 27–28, 2011	Mitt Romney; 37%	Ron Paul; 23%	Newt Gingrich; 16%	Jon Huntsman 16%, Not sure 8%
CNN/Time Magazine Margin of error: ±4% Sample size: 543	Dec. 21–27, 2011	Mitt Romney; 44%	Ron Paul; 17%	Newt Gingrich; 16%	Jon Huntsman 9%, Rick Santorum 4%, Michele Bachmann 3%, Rick Perry 2%, None/No one 1%, No opinion 4%
Boston Globe/University of New Hampshire Margin of error: ±4.2% Sample size: 543	Dec. 12–19, 2011	Mitt Romney; 39%	Newt Gingrich; 17%	Ron Paul; 17%	Jon Huntsman 11%, Rick Santorum 3%, Michele Bachmann 2%, Rick Perry 1%, Gary Johnson <1%, Buddy Roemer <1%, other 4%, undecided 8%
Public Policy Polling Margin of error: ±2.8% Sample size: 1,235	Dec. 16–18, 2011	Mitt Romney; 35%	Ron Paul; 19%	Newt Gingrich; 17%	Jon Huntsman 13%, Michele Bachmann 5%, Rick Santorum 3%, Rick Perry 2%, Gary Johnson 1%, Undecided 4%
Public Policy Polling Margin of error: ±2.8% Sample size: 1,235	Dec. 16–18, 2011	Mitt Romney; 37%	Ron Paul; 21%	Newt Gingrich; 20%	Jon Huntsman 15%, Not sure 7%
American Research Group Margin of error: ±4% Sample size: 600	Dec. 11–14, 2011	Mitt Romney; 35%	Ron Paul; 21%	Newt Gingrich; 16%	Jon Huntsman 13%, Michele Bachmann 4%, Rick Perry 2%, Rick Santorum 1%, Undecided 8%
Suffolk University/7NEWS Margin of error: ±4.9% Sample size: 400	Dec. 10–13, 2011	Mitt Romney; 38%	Newt Gingrich; 20%	Jon Huntsman; 13%	Ron Paul 8%, Michele Bachmann 3%, Herman Cain 2%, Rick Santorum 2%, Buddy Roemer 2%, Gary Johnson 1%, Rick Perry 1%, Fred Karger 0%, Undecided 11%
Insider Advantage/Majority Opinion Margin of error: ±--% Sample size: 521	Dec. 12, 2011	Mitt Romney; 29.1%	Newt Gingrich; 23.9%	Ron Paul; 20.6%	Jon Huntsman 11.3%, Michele Bachmann 3.7%, Rick Santorum 2.4%, Rick Perry 0.5%, Some other candidate 2.4%, No Opinion 6.1%
Rasmussen Margin of error: ±4% Sample size: 721	Dec. 12, 2011	Mitt Romney; 33%	Newt Gingrich; 22%	Ron Paul; 18%	Jon Huntsman 10%, Michele Bachmann 3%, Rick Perry 3%, Rick Santorum 3%, Some other candidate 2%, Not sure 5%
CNN/Time Magazine Margin of error: ±4.5% Sample size: 507	Nov. 29 – Dec. 6, 2011	Mitt Romney; 35%	Newt Gingrich; 26%	Ron Paul; 17%	Jon Huntsman 8%, Michele Bachmann 3%, Rick Perry 2%, Rick Santorum 2%, Other 1%, None 1%, No Opinion 6%
NBC News/Marist Margin of error: 3.7% Sample size: 696	Nov. 28–30, 2011	Mitt Romney; 39%	Newt Gingrich; 23%	Ron Paul; 16%	Jon Huntsman 9%, Michele Bachmann 3%, Rick Perry 3%, Herman Cain 2%, Rick Santorum 1%, Undecided 4%
Rasmussen Reports Margin of error: 4% Sample size: 762	Nov. 28, 2011	Mitt Romney; 34%	Newt Gingrich; 24%	Ron Paul; 14%	Jon Huntsman 11%, Herman Cain 5%, Michele Bachmann 2%, Rick Perry 2%, Rick Santorum 1%
University of New Hampshire/WMUR Margin of error: 4.8% Sample size: 413	Nov. 21–22, 2011	Mitt Romney; 42%	Newt Gingrich; 15%	Ron Paul; 12%	Jon Huntsman 8%, Herman Cain 4%, Rick Perry 4%, Michele Bachmann 2%, Gary Johnson 1%, Buddy Roemer 1%, Rick Santorum 1%, Fred Karger 0%
The Polling Company Margin of error: ±4.4% Sample size: 500	Nov. 18–21, 2011	Mitt Romney; 35%	Newt Gingrich; 18%	Ron Paul; 10%	Jon Huntsman 9%, Herman Cain 8%, Michele Bachmann 4%, Rick Perry 4%, Rick Santorum 2%
Suffolk University/7NEWS Margin of error: ±4.9% Sample size: 400	Nov. 16–20, 2011	Mitt Romney; 41%	Newt Gingrich; 14%	Ron Paul; 14%	Jon Huntsman 9%, Herman Cain 8%, Rick Santorum 3%, Rick Perry 2%, Michele Bachmann 1%, Fred Karger 1%, Buddy Roemer 1%, Gary Johnson 0%, Undecided 9%
American Research Group Margin of error: ±4% Sample size: 600	Nov. 16–20, 2011	Mitt Romney; 33%	Newt Gingrich; 22%	Ron Paul; 12%	Herman Cain 9%, Jon Huntsman 8%, Michele Bachmann 2%, Rick Perry 2%, Gary Johnson 1%, Buddy Roemer 1%, Rick Santorum 1%, Other 0%, Undecided 9%
Magellan Strategies Margin of error: ±3.59% Sample size: 746	Nov. 15–16, 2011	Mitt Romney; 29%	Newt Gingrich; 27%	Ron Paul; 16%	Herman Cain 10%, Jon Huntsman 8%, Michele Bachmann 2%, Rick Perry 2%, Rick Santorum 1%, Other 2%, Undecided 3%
Bloomberg News Margin of error: ±4.4% Sample size: 504	Nov. 10–12, 2011	Mitt Romney; 40%	Ron Paul; 17%	Newt Gingrich; 11%	Herman Cain 8%, Jon Huntsman 7%, Rick Perry 3%, Michele Bachmann 2%, Rick Santorum 1%, Other 1%, Not sure 10%
Rasmussen Reports Margin of error: ±4% Sample size: 816	Oct. 25, 2011	Mitt Romney; 41%	Herman Cain; 17%	Ron Paul; 11%	Newt Gingrich 8%, Jon Huntsman 7%, Rick Perry 4%, Michele Bachmann 3%, Rick Santorum 1%, Other 2%, Undecided 5%
CNN/Time Magazine Margin of error: ±5% Sample size: 400	Oct. 20–25, 2011	Mitt Romney; 40%	Herman Cain; 13%	Ron Paul; 12%	Jon Huntsman 6%, Newt Gingrich 5%, Rick Perry 4%, Michele Bachmann 2%, Rick Santorum 1%, None 5%, No Opinion 14%
AARP/GS Strategy Group Margin of error: ±4.9% Sample size: 400	Oct. 17–18, 2011	Mitt Romney; 43%	Herman Cain; 18%	Ron Paul; 9%	Newt Gingrich 5%, Michele Bachmann 3%, Jon Huntsman 3%, Rick Perry 3%, Rick Santorum 1%, Undecided 15%
Magellan Strategies Margin of error: ±3.61% Sample size: 736	Oct. 12–13, 2011	Mitt Romney; 41%	Herman Cain; 20%	Ron Paul; 10%	Newt Gingrich 6%, Jon Huntsman 6%, Michele Bachmann 4%, Rick Perry 2%, Rick Santorum 2%, Gary Johnson 1%, Undecided 8%
Harvard University/St. Anselm's New Hampshire Institute of Politics Margin of error: ±4.4% Sample size: 648	Oct. 2–6, 2011	Mitt Romney; 38%	Herman Cain; 20%	Ron Paul; 13%	Newt Gingrich 5%, Jon Huntsman 4%, Rick Perry 4%, Michele Bachmann 3%, Gary Johnson 1%, Rick Santorum 1%, Don't know 11%
WMUR/University of New Hampshire Margin of error: ±5.3% Sample size: 345	Sep. 26 – Oct. 6, 2011	Mitt Romney; 37%	Herman Cain; 12%	Ron Paul; 9%	Rudy Giuliani 8%, Jon Huntsman 8%, Newt Gingrich 4%, Rick Perry 4%, Sarah Palin 3%, Michele Bachmann 2%, Rick Santorum 2%, Gary Johnson <1%, Buddy Roemer <1%
NBC News-Marist Poll Margin of error: ±3.7% Sample size: 691	Oct. 3–5, 2011	Mitt Romney; 44%	Herman Cain; 13%	Ron Paul; 13%	Rick Perry 6%, Jon Huntsman 5%, Newt Gingrich 4%, Michele Bachmann 2%, Gary Johnson 1%, Rick Santorum 1%, Undecided 11%
Rasmussen Reports Margin of error: ±4% Sample size: 750	Sep. 21, 2011	Mitt Romney; 39%	Rick Perry; 18%	Ron Paul; 13%	Jon Huntsman 7%, Michele Bachmann 5%, Herman Cain 4%, Newt Gingrich 4%, Rick Santorum 2%, Other 3%, Undecided 4%
American Research Group Margin of error: ±4% Sample size: 600	Sep. 16–21, 2011	Mitt Romney; 30%	Rick Perry; 13%	Ron Paul; 12%	Jon Huntsman 10%, Michele Bachmann 7%, Herman Cain 4%, Newt Gingrich 4%, Sarah Palin 4%, Rick Santorum 2%, Buddy Roemer 1%, Gary Johnson 0%, Other 1%
Suffolk University/7News Margin of error: ±5.3% Sample size: 400	Sep. 18–20, 2011	Mitt Romney; 41%	Ron Paul; 14%	Jon Huntsman; 10%	Rick Perry 8%, Sarah Palin 6%, Michele Bachmann 5%, Newt Gingrich 4%, Rick Santorum 1%, Herman Cain 1%, Buddy Roemer 1%, Gary Johnson 0%, Fred Karger 0%, Thaddeus McCotter 0%
Magellen Strategies Margin of error: ±3.96% Sample size: 613	Aug. 15–16, 2011	Mitt Romney; 36%	Rick Perry; 18%	Ron Paul; 14%	Michele Bachmann 10%, Herman Cain 3%, Jon Huntsman 3%, Newt Gingrich 2%, Rick Santorum 1%, other 3%, undecided 8%
American Research Group Margin of error: ±4% Sample size: 600	Jul. 9–13, 2011	Mitt Romney; 29%	Michele Bachmann; 12%	Rudy Giuliani; 9%	Sarah Palin 8%, Newt Gingrich 7%, Tim Pawlenty 5%, Herman Cain 4%, Ron Paul 4%, Rick Perry 2%, Rick Santorum 2%, Other/Undecided 18%
Public Policy Polling Margin of error: ±5.3% Sample size: 341	Jun. 30 – Jul. 5, 2011	Mitt Romney; 25%	Michele Bachmann; 18%	Sarah Palin; 11%	Ron Paul 9%, Herman Cain 7%, Rick Perry 7%, Jon Huntsman 6%, Tim Pawlenty 6%, Newt Gingrich 4%, someone else/not sure 7%
Public Policy Polling Margin of error: ±5.3% Sample size: 341	Jun. 30 – Jul. 5, 2011	Mitt Romney; 28%	Michele Bachmann; 21%	Ron Paul; 9%	Rick Perry 9%, Herman Cain 7%, Jon Huntsman 7%, Tim Pawlenty 6%, Newt Gingrich 4%, someone else/not sure 9%
Public Policy Polling Margin of error: ±5.3% Sample size: 341	Jun. 30 – Jul. 5, 2011	Mitt Romney; 26%	Chris Christie; 20%	Michele Bachmann; 14%	Rudy Giuliani 9%, Jeb Bush 8%, Sarah Palin 8%, Tim Pawlenty 5%, Paul Ryan 3%, someone else/not sure 8%
Public Policy Polling Margin of error: ±5.3% Sample size: 341	Jun. 30 – Jul. 5, 2011	Mitt Romney; 65%	Sarah Palin; 26%	–	Not sure 9%
Public Policy Polling Margin of error: ±5.3% Sample size: 341	Jun. 30 – Jul. 5, 2011	Mitt Romney; 59%	Tim Pawlenty; 25%	–	Not sure 16%
Public Policy Polling Margin of error: ±5.3% Sample size: 341	Jun. 30 – Jul. 5, 2011	Mitt Romney; 53%	Rick Perry; 28%	–	Not sure 19%
Public Policy Polling Margin of error: ±5.3% Sample size: 341	Jun. 30 – Jul. 5, 2011	Mitt Romney; 49%	Michele Bachmann; 37%	–	Not sure 14%
WMUR/University of New Hampshire Margin of error: ±5.2% Sample size: 357	Jun. 21 – Jul. 1, 2011	Mitt Romney; 35%	Michele Bachmann; 12%	Rudy Giuliani; 7%	Ron Paul 7%, Rick Perry 4%, Sarah Palin 3%, Tim Pawlenty 3%, Herman Cain 2%, Jon Huntsman 2%, Newt Gingrich 1%, Gary Johnson 1%, Rick Santorum 1%
Suffolk University Margin of error: ±4.9% Sample size: 400	Jun. 25–27, 2011	Mitt Romney; 36%	Michele Bachmann; 11%	Ron Paul; 8%	Rudy Giuliani 5%, Jon Huntsman 4%, Sarah Palin 4%, Herman Cain 2%, Tim Pawlenty 2%, Rick Perry 2%, Newt Gingrich 2%, George Pataki 1%, Rick Santorum 1%, John R. Bolton 0%, Jim DeMint 0%, Gary Johnson 0%, Fred Karger 0%, Roy Moore 0%, Buddy Roemer 0%, Undecided 21%
Magellan Strategies Margin of error: ±3.63% Sample size: 727	Jun. 14–15, 2011	Mitt Romney; 42%	Michele Bachmann; 10%	Ron Paul; 10%	Sarah Palin 7%, Rudy Giuliani 6%, Tim Pawlenty 5%, Newt Gingrich 4%, Herman Cain 3%, Jon Huntsman 3%, Rick Santorum 2%
University of New Hampshire Margin of error: ±4.8% Sample size: 424	Jun. 1–8, 2011	Mitt Romney; 41%	Rudy Giuliani; 9%	Ron Paul; 6%	Sarah Palin 5%, Michele Bachmann 4%, Herman Cain 4%, Newt Gingrich 3%, Jon Huntsman 3%, Tim Pawlenty 3%, Rick Santorum 3%, Gary Johnson <1%
CNN /WMUR /University of New Hampshire Margin of error: ±5.2% Sample size: 347	May 17–22, 2011	Mitt Romney; 32%	Ron Paul; 9%	Newt Gingrich; 6%	Rudy Giuliani 6%, Sarah Palin 5%, Michele Bachmann 4%, Herman Cain 4%, Mitch Daniels 4%, Jon Huntsman 4%, Tim Pawlenty 4%, Rick Santorum 2%
Suffolk University/7 News Margin of error: ±4.9% Sample size: 400	Apr. 30 – May 2, 2011	Mitt Romney; 35%	Ron Paul; 8%	Donald Trump; 8%	Rudy Giuliani 8%, Sarah Palin 7%, Mike Huckabee 6%, Tim Pawlenty 5%, Newt Gingrich 3%, Michele Bachmann 3%, Herman Cain 2%, Rick Santorum 2%, John R. Bolton 1%, Mitch Daniels 1%, Gary Johnson 1%, Jon Huntsman 1%, Fred Karger 0%, Roy Moore 0%, Buddy Roemer 0%, Undecided 13%
Public Policy Polling Margin of error: ±5.0% Sample size: 384	Mar. 31 – Apr. 3, 2011	Mitt Romney; 31%	Mike Huckabee; 15%	Newt Gingrich; 13%	Sarah Palin 10%, Ron Paul 10%, Michele Bachmann 4%, Tim Pawlenty 4%, Haley Barbour 2%, someone else/undecided 12%
Public Policy Polling Margin of error: ±5.0% Sample size: 384	Mar. 31 – Apr. 3, 2011	Mitt Romney; 37%	Newt Gingrich; 14%	Sarah Palin; 14%	Ron Paul 13%, Tim Pawlenty 5%, Michele Bachmann 4%, Haley Barbour 2%, someone else/undecided 11%
Public Policy Polling Margin of error: ±5.0% Sample size: 384	Mar. 31 – Apr. 3, 2011	Mitt Romney; 37%	Mike Huckabee; 14%	Newt Gingrich; 13%	Ron Paul 13%, Michele Bachmann 7%, Tim Pawlenty 6%, Haley Barbour 2%, someone else/undecided 10%
Public Policy Polling Margin of error: ±5.0% Sample size: 384	Mar. 31 – Apr. 3, 2011	Mitt Romney; 40%	Ron Paul; 18%	Newt Gingrich; 17%	Michele Bachmann 8%, Tim Pawlenty 5%, Haley Barbour 3%, someone else/undecided 10%
Public Policy Polling Margin of error: ±5.0% Sample size: 384	Mar. 31 – Apr. 3, 2011	Mitt Romney; 29%	Rudy Giuliani; 17%	Mike Huckabee; 12%	Newt Gingrich 11%, Ron Paul 9%, Sarah Palin 6%, Michele Bachmann 5%, Tim Pawlenty 5%, someone else/undecided 7%
Public Policy Polling Margin of error: ±5.0% Sample size: 384	Mar. 31 – Apr. 3, 2011	Mitt Romney; 27%	Donald Trump; 21%	Newt Gingrich; 12%	Mike Huckabee 12%, Ron Paul 9%, Sarah Palin 7%, Tim Pawlenty 4%, Michele Bachmann 3%, someone else/undecided 7%
WMUR/Granite State Poll Margin of error: ±5.2% Sample size: 357	Jan. 28 – Feb. 7, 2011	Mitt Romney; 40%	Rudy Giuliani; 10%	Mike Huckabee; 7%	Tim Pawlenty 7%, Newt Gingrich 6%, Sarah Palin 6%, Ron Paul 5%, Donald Trump 3%, Haley Barbour 1%, Rick Santorum 1%
Strategic National Margin of error: ±3.2% Sample size: 940	Jan. 19, 2011	Mitt Romney; 34%	Mike Huckabee; 14%	Sarah Palin; 13%	Newt Gingrich 9%, Tim Pawlenty 5%, Mitch Daniels 2%, Haley Barbour 1%, Rick Santorum 1%, John Thune 0%, other/undecided 22%
Magellan Strategies Margin of error: ±2.6% Sample size: 1451	Jan. 4, 2011	Mitt Romney; 39%	Sarah Palin; 16%	Mike Huckabee; 10%	Newt Gingrich 8%, Ron Paul 7%, Tim Pawlenty 4%, Rick Santorum 3%, Haley Barbour 1%, other candidate 4%, undecided 8%
Public Policy Polling Margin of error: ±4.1% Sample size: 582	Oct. 27–29, 2010	Mitt Romney; 40%	Mike Huckabee; 13%	Newt Gingrich; 10%	Sarah Palin 10%, Tim Pawlenty 4%, Mike Pence 3%, Mitch Daniels 1%, John Thune 1%, someone else/undecided 19%
Public Policy Polling Margin of error: ±2.9% Sample size: 1,134	Sep. 11–12, 2010	Mitt Romney; 41%	Newt Gingrich; 12%	Sarah Palin; 12%	Mike Huckabee 10%, Ron Paul 8%, Tim Pawlenty 5%, Mitch Daniels 2%, other candidate 3%, undecided 7%
Public Policy Polling Margin of error: ±4.81% Sample size: 415	Jul. 23–25, 2010	Mitt Romney; 31%	Newt Gingrich; 14%	Ron Paul; 13%	Mike Huckabee 12%, Sarah Palin 9%, Tim Pawlenty 3%, Mitch Daniels 1%, other candidate 5%, undecided 11%
Magellan Strategies Margin of error: ±4.4% Sample size: 505	May 25, 2010	Mitt Romney; 40%	Newt Gingrich; 16%	Sarah Palin; 11%	Mike Huckabee 10%, Ron Paul 6%, Tim Pawlenty 5%, Rick Santorum 2%, other candidate 5%, undecided 6%
WMUR/Granite State Poll Margin of error: ±6.5% Sample size: 228	Apr. 18–28, 2010	Mitt Romney; 41%	Sarah Palin; 12%	Rudy Giuliani; 11%	Mike Huckabee 9%, Ron Paul 6%, Newt Gingrich 5%, Tim Pawlenty 3%, Rick Santorum 2%, other candidate 3%, undecided 9%
Public Policy Polling Margin of error: ±3.9% Sample size: 642	Apr. 17–18, 2010	Mitt Romney; 39%	Sarah Palin; 13%	Newt Gingrich; 11%	Mike Huckabee 11%, Ron Paul 7%, Tim Pawlenty 3%, Haley Barbour 1%, Rick Santorum 1%, undecided 13%
Now Hampshire/Populus Research Margin of error: ±5% Sample size: 403	Aug. 10–11, 2009	Mitt Romney; 50%	Mike Huckabee; 17%	Sarah Palin; 17%	Newt Gingrich 13%, Tim Pawlenty 3%

=== South Carolina (January 21) ===
Winner: Newt Gingrich
Primary date: January 21, 2012
Delegates: 25

Poll source	Date	1st	2nd	3rd	Other
Primary results Turnout: 601,166	Jan. 21, 2012	Newt Gingrich; 40.4%	Mitt Romney; 27.8%	Rick Santorum; 17.0%	Ron Paul 13.0%, Herman Cain 1.1%, Rick Perry 0.4%, Jon Huntsman 0.2%, Michele Bachmann 0.1%, Gary Johnson 0.0%
American Research Group Margin of error: ±4% Sample size: 600	Jan. 19–20, 2012	Newt Gingrich; 40%	Mitt Romney; 26%	Ron Paul; 18%	Rick Santorum 13%, Other 1%, Undecided 2%
Public Policy Polling Margin of error: ±2.5% Sample size: 1,540	Jan. 18–20, 2012	Newt Gingrich; 37%	Mitt Romney; 28%	Rick Santorum; 16%	Ron Paul 14%, Someone else/not sure 5%
Clemson University Margin of error: ±4.73% Sample size: 429	Jan. 18–19, 2012	Newt Gingrich; 32%	Mitt Romney; 26%	Ron Paul; 11%	Rick Santorum 9%, Undecided 20%
Public Policy Polling Margin of error: ±3.4% Sample size: 836	Jan. 18–19, 2012	Newt Gingrich; 35%	Mitt Romney; 29%	Ron Paul; 15%	Rick Santorum 15%, Someone else/not sure 5%
Rasmussen Margin of error: ±4% Sample size: 750	Jan. 18, 2012	Newt Gingrich; 33%	Mitt Romney; 31%	Ron Paul; 15%	Rick Santorum 11%, Rick Perry 2%, Someone else 1%, Undecided 6%
Public Policy Polling Margin of error: ±5% Sample size: 379	Jan. 18, 2012	Newt Gingrich; 34%	Mitt Romney; 28%	Ron Paul; 15%	Rick Santorum 14%, Rick Perry 5%, Buddy Roemer 3%, Someone else/Not sure 2%
Public Policy Polling Margin of error: ±5% Sample size: 379	Jan. 18, 2012	Newt Gingrich; 31%	Mitt Romney; 26%	Ron Paul; 13%	Rick Santorum 13%, Stephen Colbert 8%, Rick Perry 6%, Buddy Roemer 1%, Someone else/Not sure 3%
InsiderAdvantage Margin of error: ±3.6% Sample size: 718	Jan. 18, 2012	Newt Gingrich; 31.6%	Mitt Romney; 28.8%	Ron Paul; 15.2%	Rick Santorum 10.9%, Rick Perry 2.9%, Other/No opinion 10.4%
Politico/The Tarrance Group Margin of error: ±4.1% Sample size: 600	Jan. 17–18, 2012	Mitt Romney; 37%	Newt Gingrich; 30%	Ron Paul; 11%	Rick Santorum 10%, Rick Perry 4%, Other <0.5%, Undecided 8%
American Research Group Margin of error: ±4% Sample size: 600	Jan. 17–18, 2012	Newt Gingrich; 33%	Mitt Romney; 32%	Ron Paul; 19%	Rick Santorum 9%, Rick Perry 4%, Other <0.5%, Undecided 3%
Reuters/Ipsos Margin of error: Sample size: 656	Jan. 16–18, 2012	Mitt Romney; 35%	Newt Gingrich; 23%	Rick Santorum; 15%	Ron Paul 13%, Rick Perry 6%, Wouldn't vote 8%, None/other 0%
Reuters/Ipsos Margin of error: Sample size: 656	Jan. 16–18, 2012	Mitt Romney; 35%	Newt Gingrich; 23%		DK/Ref 13%
NBC News/Marist Margin of error: ±3.8% Sample size: 684	Jan. 16–17, 2012	Mitt Romney; 34%	Newt Gingrich; 24%	Ron Paul; 16%	Rick Santorum 14%, Rick Perry 4%, Other 1%, Undecided 8%
CNN/Time/ORC Margin of error: ±4.5% Sample size: 505	Jan. 13–17, 2012	Mitt Romney; 33%	Newt Gingrich; 23%	Rick Santorum; 16%	Ron Paul 13%, Rick Perry 6%, Someone else 1%, None/No one 2%, No opinion 6%
Rasmussen Margin of error: ±4% Sample size: 720	Jan. 16, 2012	Mitt Romney; 35%	Newt Gingrich; 21%	Ron Paul; 16%	Rick Santorum 16%, Rick Perry 5%
Monmouth University Margin of error: ±3.2% Sample size: 963	Jan. 12–15, 2012	Mitt Romney; 33%	Newt Gingrich; 22%	Rick Santorum; 14%	Ron Paul 12%, Rick Perry 6%, Jon Huntsman 4%, Undecided/other 9%
Public Policy Polling Margin of error: ±3.5% Sample size: 803	Jan. 11–13, 2012	Mitt Romney; 29%	Newt Gingrich; 24%	Ron Paul; 15%	Rick Santorum 14%, Rick Perry 6%, Jon Huntsman 5%, Buddy Roemer 1%, Someone else/Not sure 6%
Public Policy Polling Margin of error: ±3.5% Sample size: 803	Jan. 11–13, 2012	Mitt Romney; 48%	Newt Gingrich; 37%		Not sure 15%
Public Policy Polling Margin of error: ±3.5% Sample size: 803	Jan. 11–13, 2012	Mitt Romney; 63%	Ron Paul; 28%		Not sure 9%
Public Policy Polling Margin of error: ±3.5% Sample size: 803	Jan. 11–13, 2012	Mitt Romney; 56%	Rick Perry; 31%		Not sure 12%
Public Policy Polling Margin of error: ±3.5% Sample size: 803	Jan. 11–13, 2012	Mitt Romney; 48%	Rick Santorum; 39%		Not sure 13%
Reuters/Ipsos Margin of error: Sample size: 398	Jan. 10–13, 2012	Mitt Romney; 37%	Ron Paul; 16%	Rick Santorum; 16%	Newt Gingrich 12%, Rick Perry 6%, Jon Huntsman 3%, Wouldn't vote 1%, None/Other 10%
Reuters/Ipsos Margin of error: Sample size: 398	Jan. 10–13, 2012	Mitt Romney; 62%	Newt Gingrich; 30%		DK/Ref 8%
Rasmussen Reports Margin of error: ±4% Sample size: 750	Jan. 12, 2012	Mitt Romney; 28%	Newt Gingrich; 21%	Ron Paul; 16%	Rick Santorum 16%, Rick Perry 6%, Jon Huntsman 5%, Some other candidate 1%, Undecided 8%
New Frontier Strategy Margin of error: ±3.44% Sample size: 810	Jan. 11–12, 2012	Mitt Romney; 31.72%	Newt Gingrich; 23.05%	Rick Santorum; 13.88%	Ron Paul 9.67%, Rick Perry 5.58%, Jon Huntsman 4.34%, Undecided 11.77%
American Research Group Margin of error: ±4% Sample size: 600	Jan. 11–12, 2012	Mitt Romney; 29%	Newt Gingrich; 25%	Ron Paul; 20%	Rick Perry 9%, Rick Santorum 7%, Jon Huntsman 1%, Other 2%, Undecided 7%
InsiderAdvantage/Majority Opinion Research Margin of error: ±3.1% Sample size: 726	Jan. 11, 2012	Mitt Romney; 23.1%	Newt Gingrich; 21.3%	Rick Santorum; 13.5%	Ron Paul 13.3%, Jon Huntsman 6.7%, Rick Perry 5.2%, Someone else 1.7%, No opinion 15.2%
We Ask America Margin of error: ±3.1% Sample size: 993	Jan. 9, 2012	Mitt Romney; 26%	Newt Gingrich; 21%	Rick Santorum; 13%	Ron Paul 8%, Rick Perry 5%, Jon Huntsman 4%, Undecided 22%
Public Policy Polling Margin of error: ±2.9% Sample size: 1,112	Jan. 5–7, 2012	Mitt Romney; 30%	Newt Gingrich; 23%	Rick Santorum; 19%	Ron Paul 9%, Rick Perry 5%, Jon Huntsman 4%, Buddy Roemer 1%, Someone else/Not sure 9%
Public Policy Polling Margin of error: ±2.9% Sample size: 1,112	Jan. 5–7, 2012	Mitt Romney; 27%	Newt Gingrich; 23%	Rick Santorum; 18%	Ron Paul 8%, Rick Perry 7%, Stephen Colbert 5%, Jon Huntsman 4%, Buddy Roemer 1%, Someone else/Not sure 8%
Public Policy Polling Margin of error: ±2.9% Sample size: 1,112	Jan. 5–7, 2012	Mitt Romney; 49%	Newt Gingrich; 35%		Not sure 16%
Public Policy Polling Margin of error: ±2.9% Sample size: 1,112	Jan. 5–7, 2012	Mitt Romney; 67%	Ron Paul; 23%		Not sure 10%
Public Policy Polling Margin of error: ±2.9% Sample size: 1,112	Jan. 5–7, 2012	Mitt Romney; 57%	Rick Perry; 29%		Not sure 15%
Public Policy Polling Margin of error: ±2.9% Sample size: 1,112	Jan. 5–7, 2012	Mitt Romney; 45%	Rick Santorum; 40%		Not sure 15%
Rasmussen Margin of error: ±4% Sample size: 750	Jan. 5, 2012	Mitt Romney; 27%	Rick Santorum; 24%	Newt Gingrich; 18%	Ron Paul 11%, Rick Perry 5%, Jon Huntsman 2%, Other 2%, Undecided 11%
American Research Group Margin of error: ±4% Sample size: 600	Jan. 4–5, 2012	Mitt Romney; 31%	Newt Gingrich; 24%	Rick Santorum; 24%	Ron Paul 9%, Jon Huntsman 2%, Rick Perry 2%, undecided 7%, other 1%
CNN/Time/ORC Margin of error: ±4.5% Sample size: 485	Jan. 4–5, 2012	Mitt Romney; 37%	Rick Santorum; 19%	Newt Gingrich; 18%	Ron Paul 12%, Rick Perry 5%, Jon Huntsman 1%, no opinion 6%
Clemson University Margin of error: ±4.5% Sample size: 600	Dec. 6–19, 2011	Newt Gingrich; 38%	Mitt Romney; 21%	Ron Paul; 10%	Michele Bachmann 5%, Rick Perry 5%, Jon Huntsman 3% Rick Santorum 2%, Undecided 16%
InsiderAdvantage/Majority Opinion Research Margin of error: Sample size: 736	Dec. 18, 2011	Newt Gingrich; 30.6%	Mitt Romney; 18.7%	Michele Bachmann; 8.3%	Ron Paul 7.1%, Rick Perry 5.2%, Jon Huntsman 4.3% Rick Santorum 4.1%, Someone else 1.6%, No opinion 20.1%
NBC News-Marist Margin of error: ±3.9% Sample size: 635	Dec. 4–6, 2011	Newt Gingrich; 42%	Mitt Romney; 23%	Ron Paul; 9%	Michele Bachmann 7%, Rick Perry 7%, Jon Huntsman 3%, Rick Santorum 2%, Undecided 8%
NBC News-Marist Margin of error: ±3.9% Sample size: 635	Dec. 4–6, 2011	Newt Gingrich; 48%	Mitt Romney; 30%	Ron Paul; 12%	Undecided 9%
NBC News-Marist Margin of error: ±3.9% Sample size: 635	Dec. 4–6, 2011	Newt Gingrich; 57%	Mitt Romney; 33%	–	Undecided 10%
CNN/Time Magazine Margin of error: ±4.5% Sample size: 510	Nov. 29 – Dec. 6, 2011	Newt Gingrich; 43%	Mitt Romney; 20%	Rick Perry; 8%	Michele Bachmann 6%, Ron Paul 6%, Rick Santorum 4%, Jon Huntsman 1%, No Opinion 11%
Winthrop University Margin of error: ±5.38% Sample size:	Nov. 27 – Dec. 4, 2011	Newt Gingrich; 38.4%	Mitt Romney; 21.5%	Rick Perry; 9.0%	Herman Cain 6.6%, Michele Bachmann 5.4%, Ron Paul 4.1%, Rick Santorum 3.1%, Jon Huntsman 1.4%, Gary Johnson 0.0%, Other 0.7%, Not sure 9.1%, Refused 0.1%
Augusta Chronicle /InsiderAdvantage /Majority Opinion Research Margin of error: Sample size: 519	Nov. 28, 2011	Newt Gingrich; 37.9%	Mitt Romney; 15.4%	Herman Cain; 12.9%	Ron Paul 6.9%, Rick Perry 3.7%%, Michele Bachmann 3.2%, Rick Santorum 2.2%, Someone else 4.6%, No opinion 13.2%
American Research Group Margin of error: ±4% Sample size: 600	Nov. 25–28, 2011	Newt Gingrich; 33%	Mitt Romney; 22%	Herman Cain; 10%	Ron Paul 8%, Rick Perry 8%, Michele Bachmann 3%, Jon Huntsman 3%, Rick Santorum 1%, Undecided 12%
The Polling Company Margin of error: ±4.4% Sample size: 505	Nov. 18–21, 2011	Newt Gingrich; 31%	Herman Cain; 17%	Mitt Romney; 16%	Rick Perry 6%, Michele Bachmann 5%, Ron Paul 5%, Jon Huntsman 3%, Rick Santorum 1%, Undecided 15%, Refused 2%
Rasmussen Reports Margin of error: ±4% Sample size: 770	Nov. 1, 2011	Herman Cain; 33%	Mitt Romney; 23%	Newt Gingrich; 15%	Rick Perry 9%, Ron Paul 5%, Michele Bachmann 2%, Jon Huntsman 1%, Rick Santorum 1%, some other candidate 1%, undecided 10%
Rasmussen Reports Margin of error: ±4% Sample size: 770	Nov. 1, 2011	Herman Cain; 50%	Mitt Romney; 37%	–	
Rasmussen Reports Margin of error: ±4% Sample size: 770	Nov. 1, 2011	Herman Cain; 56%	Rick Perry; 27%	–	
Rasmussen Reports Margin of error: ±4% Sample size: 770	Nov. 1, 2011	Mitt Romney; 49%	Rick Perry; 30%	–	
Clemson University Margin of error: ±4.5% Sample size: 600	Oct. 27 – Nov. 7, 2011	Mitt Romney; 22%	Herman Cain; 20%	Newt Gingrich; 10%	Rick Perry 9%, Ron Paul 4%, Michele Bachmann 3%, Jon Huntsman 1%, Rick Santorum 1%, Undecided 31%
CNN/Time Magazine Margin of error: ±5% Sample size: 400	Oct. 20–25, 2011	Mitt Romney; 25%	Herman Cain; 23%	Ron Paul; 12%	Rick Perry 11%, Newt Gingrich 8%, Michele Bachmann 4%, Jon Huntsman 1%, Rick Santorum 1%, None 5%, No Opinion 10%
AARP/GS Strategy Group Margin of error: ±4.9% Sample size: 400	Oct. 18–19, 2011	Herman Cain; 28%	Mitt Romney; 27%	Rick Perry; 8%	Newt Gingrich 7%, Ron Paul 5%, Michele Bachmann 3%, Jon Huntsman 2%, Rick Santorum 1%, Undecided 19%
NBC News/Marist Poll Margin of error: ±3.1% Sample size: 992	Oct. 18, 2011	Herman Cain; 28%	Mitt Romney; 27%	Rick Perry; 10%	Newt Gingrich 6%, Ron Paul 6%, Michele Bachmann 5%, Rick Santorum 2%, Jon Huntsman 1%, Gary Johnson 0%, Undecided 17%
InsiderAdvantage /Majority Opinion Research poll Margin of error: ±5.0% Sample size: 476	Oct. 16, 2011	Herman Cain; 32%	Mitt Romney; 16%	Rick Perry; 12%	Newt Gingrich 8%, Michele Bachmann 6%, Ron Paul 6%, Jon Huntsman 1%, Other 4%, Undecided 15%
American Research Group Margin of error: ±4.0% Sample size: 600	Oct. 5–10, 2011	Herman Cain; 26%	Mitt Romney; 25%	Rick Perry; 15%	Newt Gingrich 8%, Ron Paul 7%, Michele Bachmann 5%, Rick Santorum 1%, Other 1%, Undecided 12%
Winthrop University Margin of error: ±4.01% Sample size: 596	Sep. 11–18, 2011	Rick Perry; 30.5%	Mitt Romney; 27.3%	Herman Cain; 7.7%	Sarah Palin 5.8%, Newt Gingrich 5.3%, Ron Paul 4.2%, Michele Bachmann 3.5%, Jon Huntsman 1.6%, Rick Santorum 1.5%, Other 0.2%, Not Sure 11.1%, Refused 1.2%
Public Policy Polling Margin of error: ±3.6% Sample size: 750	Aug. 25–28, 2011	Rick Perry; 36%	Mitt Romney; 13%	Sarah Palin; 10%	Herman Cain 9%, Michele Bachmann 7%, Newt Gingrich 7%, Ron Paul 5%, Rick Santorum 4%, Jon Huntsman 2%, someone else/not sure 7%
Public Policy Polling Margin of error: ±3.6% Sample size: 750	Aug. 25–28, 2011	Rick Perry; 36%	Mitt Romney; 16%	Michele Bachmann; 13%	Herman Cain 9%, Newt Gingrich 8%, Ron Paul 5%, Rick Santorum 4%, Jon Huntsman 2%, someone else/not sure 7%
Public Policy Polling Margin of error: ±3.6% Sample size: 750	Aug. 25–28, 2011	Rick Perry; 50%	Mitt Romney; 25%	Michele Bachmann; 16%	not sure 9%
Public Policy Polling Margin of error: ±3.6% Sample size: 750	Aug. 25–28, 2011	Mitt Romney; 45%	Michele Bachmann; 40%	–	not sure 15%
Public Policy Polling Margin of error: ±3.6% Sample size: 750	Aug. 25–28, 2011	Rick Perry; 59%	Mitt Romney; 28%	–	not sure 13%
Public Policy Polling Margin of error: ±3.6% Sample size: 750	Aug. 25–28, 2011	Rick Perry; 63%	Michele Bachmann; 20%	–	not sure 18%
Magellan Strategies Margin of error: ±3.88% Sample size: 637	Aug. 22–23, 2011	Rick Perry; 31%	Mitt Romney; 20%	Michele Bachmann; 14%	Herman Cain 9%, Newt Gingrich 5%, Ron Paul 4%, Jon Huntsman 2%, Rick Santorum 2%, Other candidate 4%, Undecided 9%
Public Policy Polling Margin of error: ±3.1% Sample size: 1000	Jun. 2–5, 2011	Mitt Romney; 27%	Sarah Palin; 18%	Herman Cain; 12%	Newt Gingrich 12%, Michele Bachmann 9%, Ron Paul 7%, Tim Pawlenty 4%, Jon Huntsman 2%, Someone else/Undecided 9%
Public Policy Polling Margin of error: ±3.1% Sample size: 1000	Jun. 2–5, 2011	Mitt Romney; 30%	Herman Cain; 15%	Newt Gingrich; 15%	Michele Bachmann 13%, Ron Paul 10%, Tim Pawlenty 5%, Jon Huntsman 2%, Someone else/Undecided 11%
Public Policy Polling Margin of error: ±3.1% Sample size: 1000	Jun. 2–5, 2011	Jim DeMint; 35%	Mitt Romney; 21%	Sarah Palin; 11%	Herman Cain 8%, Newt Gingrich 6%, Michele Bachmann 5%, Ron Paul 4%, Tim Pawlenty 2%, Someone else/Undecided 8%
Public Policy Polling Margin of error: ±4.1% Sample size: 559	Jan. 28–30, 2011	Mike Huckabee; 26%	Mitt Romney; 20%	Sarah Palin; 18%	Newt Gingrich 13%, Ron Paul 7%, Tim Pawlenty 4%, Mitch Daniels 3%, undecided 8%
Public Policy Polling Margin of error: ±4.1% Sample size: 559	Jan. 28–30, 2011	Jim DeMint; 24%	Mike Huckabee; 20%	Mitt Romney; 17%	Sarah Palin 12%, Newt Gingrich 10%, Ron Paul 4%, Tim Pawlenty 3%, Mitch Daniels 2%, undecided 8%
Public Policy Polling Margin of error: ±3.9% Sample size: 638	May 22–23, 2010	Newt Gingrich; 25%	Mitt Romney; 24%	Sarah Palin; 22%	Mike Huckabee 19%, Ron Paul 7%, undecided 4%
Public Policy Polling Margin of error: ±3.9% Sample size: 638	May 22–23, 2010	Jim DeMint; 21%	Newt Gingrich; 16%	Mitt Romney; 16%	Mike Huckabee 15%, Sarah Palin 15%, Ron Paul 7%, undecided 10%

=== Florida (January 31) ===
Winner: Mitt Romney
Primary date: January 31, 2012
Delegates: 50

Poll source	Date	1st	2nd	3rd	Other
Primary results Turnout: 1,669,640	Jan. 31, 2012	Mitt Romney; 46.4%	Newt Gingrich; 31.9%	Rick Santorum; 13.3%	Ron Paul 7.0%, Rick Perry 0.4%, Jon Huntsman 0.4%, Michele Bachmann 0.2%, Herman Cain 0.2%, Gary Johnson 0.1%
Public Policy Polling Margin of error: ±3% Sample size: 1,087	Jan. 28–30, 2012	Mitt Romney; 39%	Newt Gingrich; 31%	Rick Santorum; 15%	Ron Paul 11%, Someone else/Not sure 5%
Insider Advantage/Majority Opinion Research Margin of error: ±3.8% Sample size: 646	Jan. 29, 2012	Mitt Romney; 35.7%	Newt Gingrich; 31.1%	Rick Santorum; 12.4%	Ron Paul 12.2%, Someone else 2.0%, No opinion 6.6%
We Ask America Margin of error: ±2.84% Sample size: 1,188	Jan. 29, 2012	Mitt Romney; 44%	Newt Gingrich; 25%	Ron Paul; 10%	Rick Santorum 10%, Undecided 11%
Rasmussen Reports Margin of error: ±4% Sample size: 750	Jan. 29, 2012	Mitt Romney; 44%	Newt Gingrich; 28%	Rick Santorum; 12%	Ron Paul 10%, Some other candidate 1%, Undecided 5%
Suffolk University Margin of error: Sample size: 500	Jan. 28–29, 2012	Mitt Romney; 47%	Newt Gingrich; 27%	Rick Santorum; 12%	Ron Paul 9%, Undecided 5%
Public Policy Polling Margin of error: ±3.6% Sample size: 733	Jan. 28–29, 2012	Mitt Romney; 39%	Newt Gingrich; 32%	Rick Santorum; 14%	Ron Paul 11%, Someone else/Not sure 4%
Quinnipiac Margin of error: ±4.2% Sample size: 539	Jan. 27–29, 2012	Mitt Romney; 43%	Newt Gingrich; 29%	Ron Paul; 11%	Rick Santorum 11%, Don't know/No answer 7%
Survey USA Margin of error: ±4.2% Sample size: 500	Jan. 27–29, 2012	Mitt Romney; 41%	Newt Gingrich; 26%	Ron Paul; 12%	Rick Santorum 12%
Public Policy Polling Margin of error: ±5% Sample size: 387	Jan. 28, 2012	Mitt Romney; 40%	Newt Gingrich; 32%	Rick Santorum; 15%	Ron Paul 9%, Someone else/Not sure 4%
Miami Herald/War Room Logistics Margin of error: ±2.5% Sample size: 1,632	Jan. 27, 2012	Mitt Romney; 40.4%	Newt Gingrich; 30.1%	Rick Santorum; 15.3%	Ron Paul 5.9%, Undecided 8.3%
Reuters/Ipsos Margin of error: ±4.2% Sample size: 732	Jan. 26–27, 2012	Mitt Romney; 41%	Newt Gingrich; 33%	Rick Santorum; 13%	Ron Paul 5%, Other/undecided 8%
NBC News/Marist Margin of error: ±3.8% Sample size: 682	Jan. 25–27, 2012	Mitt Romney; 42%	Newt Gingrich; 27%	Rick Santorum; 16%	Ron Paul 11%, Undecided 4%
Mason-Dixon Polling and Research/Bay News 9 Margin of error: ±4.5% Sample size: 500	Jan. 24–26, 2012	Mitt Romney; 42%	Newt Gingrich; 31%	Rick Santorum; 14%	Ron Paul 6%, Undecided 7%
Sunshine State News/Voter Survey Service Margin of error: ±3.33% Sample size: 865	Jan. 24–26, 2012	Mitt Romney; 40%	Newt Gingrich; 31%	Rick Santorum; 12%	Ron Paul 9%, Other 1%, Undecided 6%
Quinnipiac University Margin of error: ±4.1% Sample size: 580	Jan. 24–26, 2012	Mitt Romney; 38%	Newt Gingrich; 29%	Ron Paul; 14%	Rick Santorum 12%, Someone else 1%, DK/NA 6%
Rasmussen Reports Margin of error: ±4% Sample size: 750	Jan. 25, 2012	Mitt Romney; 39%	Newt Gingrich; 31%	Rick Santorum; 12%	Ron Paul 9%, Someone else 4%, No opinion 7%
Insider Advantage/Majority Opinion Research Margin of error: ±4% Sample size: 530	Jan. 25, 2012	Mitt Romney; 40.3%	Newt Gingrich; 32.3%	Ron Paul; 9.0%	Rick Santorum 8.1%, Someone else 1.5%, No opinion 8.8%
Monmouth University Margin of error: ±4.2% Sample size: 540	Jan. 24–25, 2012	Mitt Romney; 39%	Newt Gingrich; 32%	Rick Santorum; 11%	Ron Paul 8%, Other 3%, Undecided 7%
Dixie Strategies/First Coast News Margin of error: ±1.93% Sample size: 2,567	Jan. 23–25, 2012	Newt Gingrich; 35.46%	Mitt Romney; 35.08%	Rick Santorum; 9.38%	Ron Paul 7.42%, Someone else 3.93%, No opinion 8.74%
Univision News/ABC/Latino Decisions Margin of error: ±4.4% Sample size: 517	Jan. 24, 2012	Mitt Romney; 35%	Newt Gingrich; 20%	Rick Santorum; 7%	Ron Paul 6%, Somebody else 8%, Don't know 21%, Refused 2%
American Research Group Margin of error: ±4% Sample size: 600	Jan. 23–24, 2012	Mitt Romney; 41%	Newt Gingrich; 34%	Rick Santorum; 9%	Ron Paul 7%, Other 3%, Undecided 6%
CNN/Time/ORC International Margin of error: ±5% Sample size: 369	Jan. 22–24, 2012	Mitt Romney; 36%	Newt Gingrich; 34%	Rick Santorum; 11%	Ron Paul 9%, Unsure 7%
We Ask America Margin of error: ±3.19% Sample size: 946	Jan. 23, 2012	Mitt Romney; 34%	Newt Gingrich; 32%	Rick Santorum; 9%	Ron Paul 8%, Undecided 17%
Florida Chamber of Commerce/Cherry Communications Margin of error: ±4.4% Sample size: 504	Jan. 22–23, 2012	Mitt Romney; 33.13%	Newt Gingrich; 32.95%	Rick Santorum; 10.32%	Ron Paul 6.15%, Other 1.19%, Undecided 12.90%
Public Policy Polling Margin of error: ±3.2% Sample size: 921	Jan. 22–23, 2012	Newt Gingrich; 38%	Mitt Romney; 33%	Rick Santorum; 13%	Ron Paul 10%, Someone else/Not sure 6%
Public Policy Polling Margin of error: ±3.2% Sample size: 921	Jan. 22–23, 2012	Newt Gingrich; 43%	Mitt Romney; 36%	Ron Paul; 12%	Not sure 9%
Quinnipiac University Margin of error: ±4% Sample size: 601	Jan. 19–23, 2012	Mitt Romney; 36%	Newt Gingrich; 34%	Rick Santorum; 13%	Ron Paul 10%, Someone else 1%, DK/NA 7%
Rasmussen Reports Margin of error: ±4% Sample size: 750	Jan. 22, 2012	Newt Gingrich; 41%	Mitt Romney; 32%	Rick Santorum; 11%	Ron Paul 8%, Undecided 9%
Insider Advantage/Majority Opinion Research Margin of error: ±4% Sample size: 557	Jan. 22, 2012	Newt Gingrich; 34.4%	Mitt Romney; 25.6%	Ron Paul; 13.1%	Rick Santorum 10.7%, Someone else 2.4%, No opinion 13.8%
CNN/Time/ORC International Margin of error: ±5% Sample size: 391	Jan. 13–17, 2012	Mitt Romney; 43%	Rick Santorum; 19%	Newt Gingrich; 18%	Ron Paul 9%, Rick Perry 2%, None/No one 3%, No opinion 6%
Public Policy Polling Margin of error: ±4.1% Sample size: 572	Jan. 14–16, 2012	Mitt Romney; 41%	Newt Gingrich; 26%	Rick Santorum; 11%	Ron Paul 10%, Rick Perry 4%, Buddy Roemer 1%, Undecided 7%
Public Policy Polling Margin of error: ±4.1% Sample size: 572	Jan. 14–16, 2012	Mitt Romney; 50%	Newt Gingrich; 38%		Undecided 12%
Public Policy Polling Margin of error: ±4.1% Sample size: 572	Jan. 14–16, 2012	Mitt Romney; 76%	Ron Paul; 17%		Undecided 7%
Public Policy Polling Margin of error: ±4.1% Sample size: 572	Jan. 14–16, 2012	Mitt Romney; 69%	Rick Perry; 21%		Undecided 10%
Public Policy Polling Margin of error: ±4.1% Sample size: 572	Jan. 14–16, 2012	Mitt Romney; 59%	Rick Santorum; 29%		Undecided 11%
American Research Group Margin of error: ±4% Sample size: 600	Jan. 13–15, 2012	Mitt Romney; 42%	Newt Gingrich; 25%	Rick Santorum; 9%	Ron Paul 8%, Jon Huntsman 5%, Rick Perry 3%, Other 1%, Undecided 8%
Sunshine State News/Voter Survey Service Margin of error: ±2.75% Sample size: 1,266	Jan. 11–14, 2012	Mitt Romney; 46%	Newt Gingrich; 20%	Rick Santorum; 12%	Ron Paul 9%, Rick Perry 3%, Other 1%, Undecided 8%
Sunshine State News/Voter Survey Service Margin of error: ±2.75% Sample size: 1,266	Jan. 11–14, 2012	Mitt Romney; 44%	Newt Gingrich; 20%	Rick Santorum; 12%	Ron Paul 8%, Jon Huntsman 5%, Rick Perry 3%, Other 1%, Undecided 8%
Rasmussen Reports Margin of error: ±4% Sample size: 750	Jan. 11, 2012	Mitt Romney; 41%	Newt Gingrich; 19%	Rick Santorum; 15%	Ron Paul 9%, Jon Huntsman 5%, Rick Perry 2%, Other 1%, Undecided 8%
Survey USA Margin of error: ±4.1% Sample size: 500	Jan. 8, 2012	Mitt Romney; 36%	Newt Gingrich; 25%	Rick Santorum; 17%	Ron Paul 7%, Other 5%, Undecided 10%
Quinnipiac University Margin of error: ±4.1% Sample size: 560	Jan. 4–8, 2012	Mitt Romney; 36%	Newt Gingrich; 24%	Rick Santorum; 16%	Ron Paul 10%, Rick Perry 5%, Jon Huntsman 2%, Undecided 7%
NBC News-Marist Margin of error: Sample size: 780	Dec. 15–19, 2011	Mitt Romney; 27%	Newt Gingrich; 26%	Ron Paul; 5%	Michele Bachmann 4%, Rick Perry 4%, Jon Huntsman 1%, Rick Santorum 1%, Undecided 31%
NBC News-Marist Margin of error: ±4.5% Sample size: 469	Dec. 4–7, 2011	Newt Gingrich; 44%	Mitt Romney; 29%	Ron Paul; 8%	Rick Perry 4%, Michele Bachmann 3%, Jon Huntsman 3%, Rick Santorum 2%, Undecided 8%
NBC News-Marist Margin of error: ±4.5% Sample size: 469	Dec. 4–7, 2011	Newt Gingrich; 51%	Mitt Romney; 31%	Ron Paul; 10%	Undecided 9%
NBC News-Marist Margin of error: ±4.5% Sample size: 469	Dec. 4–7, 2011	Newt Gingrich; 54%	Mitt Romney; 36%	–	Undecided 10%
Survey USA Margin of error: ±4.5% Sample size: 500	Dec. 5–6, 2011	Newt Gingrich; 45%	Mitt Romney; 23%	Michele Bachmann; 6%	Rick Perry 5%, Ron Paul 4%, Jon Huntsman 3%, Rick Santorum 2%, Other 3%, Undecided 9%
Survey USA Margin of error: ±4.5% Sample size: 500	Dec. 5–6, 2011	Newt Gingrich; 57%	Mitt Romney; 30%	–	Undecided 13%
CNN/Time Magazine Margin of error: ±4.5% Sample size: 446	Nov. 29 – Dec. 6, 2011	Newt Gingrich; 48%	Mitt Romney; 25%	Ron Paul; 5%	Michele Bachmann 3%, Jon Huntsman 3%, Rick Perry 3%, Rick Santorum 1%, Other 1%, None 3%, No Opinion 7%
Quinnipiac Margin of error: ±4.3% Sample size: 509	Nov. 28 – Dec. 5, 2011	Newt Gingrich; 35%	Mitt Romney; 22%	Herman Cain; 8%	Ron Paul 8%, Michele Bachmann 4%, Rick Perry 4%, Jon Huntsman 2%, Rick Santorum 2%, Someone Else 1%, Wouldn't Vote 2%, Don't Know/No Answer 12%
Quinnipiac Margin of error: ±4.3% Sample size: 509	Nov. 28 – Dec. 5, 2011	Newt Gingrich; 52%	Mitt Romney; 34%	–	Someone Else 2%, Wouldn't Vote 4%, Don't Know/No Answer 9%
Public Policy Polling Margin of error: ±4.5% Sample size: 470	Nov. 28–30, 2011	Newt Gingrich; 47%	Mitt Romney; 17%	Herman Cain; 15%	Ron Paul 5%, Michele Bachmann 4%, Jon Huntsman 3%, Rick Perry 2%, Rick Santorum 1%, Gary Johnson 0%, Someone Else 7%
American Research Group, Inc. Margin of error: ±4% Sample size: 600	Nov. 27–30, 2011	Newt Gingrich; 50%	Mitt Romney; 19%	Herman Cain; 10%	Jon Huntsman 3%, Ron Paul 2%, Rick Perry 2%, Michele Bachmann 1%, Buddy Roemer 1%, Rick Santorum 1%, Other 1%, Undecided 10%
Rasmussen Reports Margin of error: ±4% Sample size: 788	Nov. 8, 2011	Herman Cain; 30%	Mitt Romney; 24%	Newt Gingrich; 19%	Rick Perry 4%, Michele Bachmann 3%, Ron Paul 3%, Jon Huntsman 2%, Rick Santorum 1%
Quinnipiac University Margin of error: ±4.3% Sample size: 513	Oct. 31 – Nov. 7, 2011	Herman Cain; 27%	Mitt Romney; 21%	Newt Gingrich; 17%	Rick Perry 5%, Michele Bachmann 4%, Ron Paul 3%, Jon Huntsman 1%, Rick Santorum 1%, Unknown 16%
Suffolk University/WSVN-TV Margin of error: ±3.5% Sample size: 287	Oct. 26–30, 2011	Mitt Romney; 25%	Herman Cain; 24%	Newt Gingrich; 11%	Rick Perry 9%, Ron Paul 5%, Jon Huntsman 2%, Michele Bachmann 1%, Gary Johnson 1%, Rick Santorum 1%, Fred Karger 0%, Buddy Roemer 0%, Other 1%
CNN/Time Magazine Margin of error: ±5% Sample size: 401	Oct. 20–25, 2011	Mitt Romney; 30%	Herman Cain; 18%	Newt Gingrich; 9%	Rick Perry 9%, Ron Paul 6%, Michele Bachmann 4%, Jon Huntsman 1%, Rick Santorum 1%, Someone Else 1%, None 7%, No Opinion 14%
AARP/GS Strategy Group Margin of error: ±4.38% Sample size: 500	Oct. 18–19, 2011	Mitt Romney; 31%	Herman Cain; 29%	Newt Gingrich; 12%	Rick Perry 9%, Ron Paul 3%, Michele Bachmann 1%, Jon Huntsman 1%, Rick Santorum 1%, Undecided 14%
NBC News/Marist Margin of error: ±3.6% Sample size: 748	Oct. 18, 2011	Mitt Romney; 30%	Herman Cain; 29%	Rick Perry; 9%	Ron Paul 7%, Newt Gingrich 6%, Michele Bachmann 3%, Jon Huntsman 2%, Gary Johnson 1%, Rick Santorum 1%, Undecided 13%
Insider Advantage Margin of error: ±4.0% Sample size: 505	Oct. 16, 2011	Mitt Romney; 32.6%	Herman Cain; 30.2%	Newt Gingrich; 11.7%	Rick Perry 2.9%, Ron Paul 2.7%, Michele Bachmann 1.6%, Jon Huntsman 0.2%, Someone Else 1.8%, No Opinion 16.3%
American Research Group Margin of error: ±4.0% Sample size: 600	Oct. 7–12, 2011	Herman Cain; 34%	Mitt Romney; 28%	Newt Gingrich; 11%	Rick Perry 5%, Ron Paul 4%, Michele Bachmann 3%, Jon Huntsman 1%, Buddy Roemer 1%, Rick Santorum 1%, Undecided 12%
War Room Logistics Margin of error: ±4.14% Sample size: 561	Sep. 30, 2011	Mitt Romney; 28.2%	Herman Cain; 23.7%	Newt Gingrich; 9.8%	Rick Perry 9.1%, Michele Bachmann 3.4%, Ron Paul 3.4%, Jon Huntsman 1.8%, Rick Santorum 0.5%, Undecided 20.1%
SurveyUSA Margin of error: ±4.5% Sample size: 500	Sep. 24–27, 2011	Mitt Romney; 27%	Herman Cain; 25%	Rick Perry; 13%	Newt Gingrich 6%, Michele Bachmann 5%, Ron Paul 5%, Jon Huntsman 3%, Rick Santorum 2%, Undecided 12%, Other 4%
Public Policy Polling Margin of error: ±4.5% Sample size: 472	Sep. 22–25, 2011	Mitt Romney; 30%	Rick Perry; 24%	Newt Gingrich; 10%	Ron Paul 8%, Herman Cain 7%, Michele Bachmann 6%, Jon Huntsman 3%, Rick Santorum 2%, Someone else/Not sure 9%
Public Policy Polling Margin of error: ±4.5% Sample size: 472	Sep. 22–25, 2011	Mitt Romney; 45%	Rick Perry; 36%		Not sure 19%
War Room Logistics Margin of error: ±4.0% Sample size: 572	Sep. 20, 2011	Mitt Romney; 25.0%	Rick Perry; 24.7%	Newt Gingrich; 8.7%	Ron Paul 7.5%, Michele Bachmann 5.2%, Herman Cain 4.9%, Jon Huntsman 2.4%, Rick Santorum 0.9%, Undecided 20.6%
Quinnipiac University Margin of error: ±5.1% Sample size: 374	Sep. 14–19, 2011	Rick Perry; 28%	Mitt Romney; 22%	Sarah Palin; 8%	Herman Cain 7%, Newt Gingrich 7%, Ron Paul 6%, Michele Bachmann 5%, Jon Huntsman 2%, Rick Santorum 2%, Thaddeus McCotter 0%, someone else 1%, wouldn't vote 1%
Quinnipiac University Margin of error: ±5.1% Sample size: 374	Sep. 14–19, 2011	Rick Perry; 31%	Mitt Romney; 22%	Herman Cain; 8%	Newt Gingrich 8%, Michele Bachmann 7%, Ron Paul 6%, Jon Huntsman 2%, Rick Santorum 2%, Thaddeus McCotter 0%, someone else 1%, wouldn't vote 1%, DK/NA 13%
Quinnipiac University Margin of error: ±5.1% Sample size: 374	Sep. 14–19, 2011	Rick Perry; 46%	Mitt Romney; 38%	-	someone else 2%, wouldn't vote 2%, DK/NA 12%
Insider Advantage Margin of error: ±4.5% Sample size: 456	Sep. 13, 2011	Rick Perry; 29%	Mitt Romney; 20%	Newt Gingrich; 9%	Michele Bachmann 8%, Herman Cain 6%, Ron Paul 5%, Jon Huntsman 1%, Rick Santorum 2%, No opinion 21%
Sachs/Mason-Dixon Margin of error: ±5.8% Sample size: 625	Aug. 18–22, 2011	Mitt Romney; 28%	Rick Perry; 21%	Michele Bachmann; 13%	Herman Cain 7%, Newt Gingrich 5%, Ron Paul 4%, Rick Santorum 2%, Jon Huntsman <1%, Someone else 3%, Undecided 17%
McLaughlin & Associates Margin of error: ±6.6% Sample size: 223	Aug. 8–9, 2011	Mitt Romney; 27%	Rick Perry; 16%	Michele Bachmann; 10%	Herman Cain 5%, Newt Gingrich 5%, Ron Paul 5%, Jon Huntsman 3%, Tim Pawlenty 1%, Rick Santorum 0%, Other 6%, Undecided 22%
Quinnipiac University Margin of error: ±4.3% Sample size: 510	Jul. 27 – Aug. 2, 2011	Mitt Romney; 23%	Rick Perry; 13%	Sarah Palin; 9%	Ron Paul 9%, Herman Cain 8%, Michele Bachmann 6%, Newt Gingrich 4%, Tim Pawlenty 3%, Jon Huntsman 1%, Rick Santorum 1%, Thaddeus McCotter 0%, Someone else 3%, Wouldn't vote 3%, Don't know/no answer 17%
Quinnipiac University Margin of error: ±4.3% Sample size: 510	Jul. 27 – Aug. 2, 2011	Mitt Romney; 27%	Michele Bachmann; 10%	Herman Cain; 10%	Sarah Palin 9%, Ron Paul 9%, Tim Pawlenty 5%, Newt Gingrich 4%, Jon Huntsman 1%, Rick Santorum 1%, Thaddeus McCotter 0%, Someone else 3%, Wouldn't vote 3%, Don't know/no answer 18%
Quinnipiac University Margin of error: ±4.3% Sample size: 510	Jul. 27 – Aug. 2, 2011	Mitt Romney; 24%	Rick Perry; 14%	Ron Paul; 10%	Herman Cain 9%, Michele Bachmann 7%, Newt Gingrich 5%, Tim Pawlenty 3%, Jon Huntsman 1%, Rick Santorum 1%, Thaddeus McCotter 0%, Someone else 3%, Wouldn't vote 3%, Don't know/no answer 19%
American Research Group Margin of error: ±4% Sample size: 600	Jul. 18–24, 2011	Rick Perry; 16%	Michele Bachmann; 15%	Mitt Romney; 15%	Sarah Palin 13%, Herman Cain 11%, Rudy Giuliani 7%, Ron Paul 4%, Newt Gingrich 3%, Jon Huntsman 1%, Tim Pawlenty 1%, Rick Santorum 1%, Gary Johnson 0%
Public Policy Polling Margin of error: ±5.1% Sample size: 377	Jun. 16–19, 2011	Mitt Romney; 27%	Michele Bachmann; 17%	Sarah Palin; 17%	Herman Cain 10%, Newt Gingrich 8%, Ron Paul 7%, Tim Pawlenty 4%, Jon Huntsman 2%, someone else/not sure 9%
Public Policy Polling Margin of error: ±5.1% Sample size: 377	Jun. 16–19, 2011	Mitt Romney; 29%	Michele Bachmann; 22%	Herman Cain; 14%	Newt Gingrich 10%, Ron Paul 8%, Tim Pawlenty 6%, Jon Huntsman 2%, someone else/not sure 9%
Public Policy Polling Margin of error: ±5.1% Sample size: 377	Jun. 16–19, 2011	Jeb Bush; 27%	Mitt Romney; 17%	Sarah Palin; 14%	Michele Bachmann 12%, Chris Christie 12%, Rudy Giuliani 6%, Paul Ryan 4%, Tim Pawlenty 2%, someone else/not sure 7%
Suffolk University/7 News Margin of error: Sample size: 217	Apr. 10–12, 2011	Mitt Romney; 33%	Mike Huckabee; 14%	Newt Gingrich; 9%	Donald Trump 8%, Sarah Palin 8%, Haley Barbour 4%, Tim Pawlenty 3%, Ron Paul 2%, Michele Bachmann 1%, Undecided 17%, Other 2%
Sachs/Mason-Dixon Margin of error: ±4.9% Sample size: 400	Apr. 4–7, 2011	Mitt Romney; 23%	Mike Huckabee; 18%	Donald Trump; 13%	Newt Gingrich 11%, Tim Pawlenty 8%, Sarah Palin 5%, Mitch Daniels 4%, Ron Paul 3%, Michele Bachmann 1%, Rick Santorum 1%
Public Policy Polling Margin of error: ±4.7% Sample size: 427	Mar. 24–27, 2011	Newt Gingrich; 18%	Mike Huckabee; 18%	Mitt Romney; 18%	Sarah Palin 15%, Michele Bachmann 7%, Tim Pawlenty 6%, Ron Paul 6%, Haley Barbour 3%, someone else/undecided 8%
Public Policy Polling Margin of error: ±4.7% Sample size: 427	Mar. 24–27, 2011	Newt Gingrich; 24%	Mitt Romney; 23%	Sarah Palin; 19%	Ron Paul 9%, Michele Bachmann 7%, Tim Pawlenty 6%, Haley Barbour 3%, someone else/undecided 9%
Public Policy Polling Margin of error: ±4.7% Sample size: 427	Mar. 24–27, 2011	Mike Huckabee; 24%	Newt Gingrich; 22%	Mitt Romney; 22%	Michele Bachmann 9%, Ron Paul 6%, Tim Pawlenty 6%, Haley Barbour 2%, someone else/undecided 9%
Public Policy Polling Margin of error: ±4.7% Sample size: 427	Mar. 24–27, 2011	Newt Gingrich; 30%	Mitt Romney; 28%	Michele Bachmann; 11%	Tim Pawlenty 10%, Ron Paul 9%, Haley Barbour 3%, someone else/undecided 8%
Public Policy Polling Margin of error: ±4.7% Sample size: 427	Mar. 24–27, 2011	Newt Gingrich; 17%	Mike Huckabee; 17%	Mitt Romney; 17%	Rudy Giuliani 16%, Sarah Palin 11%, Michele Bachmann 6%, Tim Pawlenty 6%, Ron Paul 4%, someone else/undecided 6%
Public Policy Polling Margin of error: ±4.7% Sample size: 427	Mar. 24–27, 2011	Jeb Bush; 30%	Newt Gingrich; 14%	Mike Huckabee; 14%	Mitt Romney 14%, Sarah Palin 9%, Michele Bachmann 5%, Tim Pawlenty 4%, Ron Paul 4%, someone else/undecided 6%
Public Policy Polling Margin of error: ±4.9% Sample size: 400	Dec. 17–20, 2010	Mike Huckabee; 23%	Mitt Romney; 21%	Newt Gingrich; 18%	Sarah Palin 13%, Ron Paul 8%, Tim Pawlenty 4%, Mitch Daniels 2%, John Thune 1%, someone else/undecided 10%
Public Policy Polling Margin of error: ±5.9% Sample size: 280	Oct. 30–31, 2010	Mitt Romney; 28%	Sarah Palin; 22%	Newt Gingrich; 15%	Mike Huckabee 15%, Tim Pawlenty 4%, Mike Pence 2%, Mitch Daniels 1%, John Thune 1%, someone else/undecided 12%
Public Policy Polling Margin of error: ±5.0% Sample size: 400	Jul. 16–18, 2010	Mitt Romney; 31%	Newt Gingrich; 23%	Sarah Palin; 23%	Mike Huckabee 15%, Ron Paul 6%, undecided 4%
Magellan Strategies Margin of error: ±3.88% Sample size: 639	Mar. 11, 2010	Mitt Romney; 29%	Sarah Palin; 20%	Mike Huckabee; 15%	Newt Gingrich 13%, Ron Paul 5%, Tim Pawlenty 3%, other candidate 5% undecided 10%
Public Policy Polling Margin of error: ±4.4% Sample size: 492	Mar. 5–8, 2010	Mitt Romney; 52%	Mike Huckabee; 21%	Sarah Palin; 18%	undecided 9%

== See also ==
- Results of the 2012 Republican Party presidential primaries
- Straw polls for the Republican Party presidential primaries, 2012
- Nationwide opinion polling for the Republican Party 2012 presidential primaries
