= Sax (surname) =

Sax (/sæks/) is a surname. Notable people with the surname include:

- Adolphe Sax (1814–1894), Belgian inventor of the saxophone
- Cole Sax, American director
- Dave Sax (born 1958), American Major League Baseball player
- Emil Sax (1845–1927), Austrian economist
- Geoffrey Sax (sometimes credited as Geoff Sax, born 1949), British film and television director
- George D. Sax (1904–1974), American business entrepreneur, drive-in bank innovator
- Gyula Sax (1951–2014), Hungarian chess player
- Joseph Sax (1936–2014), American environmental law scholars
- Leonard Sax, American psychologist and physician.
- Karl Sax (1892–1973), American botanist and geneticist
- Marjan Sax (born 1947), Dutch feminist lesbian activist
- Sara Sax (1870–1949), American decorative ceramics artist
- Steve Sax (born 1960), American Major League Baseball player

== See also ==
- House of Sax
- Saxe (surname)
- Sachs
- Sacks (surname)
- Saks (surname)
- Saxl
