= Zacks =

Zacks is a surname. Notable people with the surname include:

- Gordon Zacks (1933–2014), American businessman and writer
- Jeff Zacks (fl. 1999), American psychologist

== See also ==
- Zack (disambiguation)
- Zaks (disambiguation)
