= Saxe =

Saxe, meaning “Saxon,” may refer to:

== Places ==
=== Germany ===
- Saxe-Lauenburg
- Saxe-Wittenberg
- Saxe-Altenburg
- Saxe-Coburg
- Saxe-Coburg and Gotha
- Saxe-Coburg-Eisenach
- Saxe-Coburg-Saalfeld
- Saxe-Eisenach
- Saxe-Eisenberg
- Saxe-Gotha
- Saxe-Gotha-Altenburg
- Saxe-Hildburghausen
- Saxe-Jena
- Saxe-Meiningen
- Saxe-Römhild
- Saxe-Saalfeld
- Saxe-Weimar
- Saxe-Weimar-Eisenach

=== United States ===
- Saxe, Virginia

== Other uses ==
- Saxe (surname)
- Porcelaine de Saxe, the French name for Meissen porcelain

== See also ==
- Sachs
- Sachse (disambiguation)
- Sacks (surname)
- Saks (disambiguation)
- Sax (disambiguation)
- Saxony (disambiguation)
- Small-angle X-ray scattering (SAXS)
- Zaks (disambiguation)
- Zax (disambiguation)
