= Sax =

Sax or SAX may refer to:

- Saxophone (or sax), a family of woodwind instruments

== People ==
- Adolphe Sax, inventor of the saxophone
- Oett M. Mallard (1915–1986), also known as Sax Mallard, Chicago-based jazz saxophonist and bandleader
- Lincoln Thompson (1949–1999), Jamaican reggae singer, musician and songwriter also known as Sax
- Sax (surname)
- Sax Rohmer, pen name of Arthur Henry Sarsfield Ward (1883–1959), English novelist best known for creating the villain Fu Manchu

== Places ==
- 3534 Sax, an asteroid
- Sax, a village in the Sennwald municipality in Switzerland
- Sax, Alicante, a municipality in Spain
- Sax, Minnesota, United States, an unincorporated community
- Shanxi, a province of China (Guobiao abbreviation SAX)

== Other ==
- Sax (cigarette), an Italian brand
- "Sax" (song), a 2015 song released by English recording artist Fleur East
- Seax, also spelled sax, an ancient Germanic, single-edged knife
- Simple API for XML, an event-driven parsing model for XML
- Baron of Sax, later Sax-Hohensax, a Swiss title; see Hohensax Castle
- ISO 639 code for the Saa language, spoken in Vanuatu
- SA-X, the main antagonist of the video game Metroid Fusion
- SAX, the Bratislava Stock Exchange stock index

== See also ==
- Doctor Sax, a novel by Jack Kerouac
- Sachs, a surname
- Sachse, Texas
- Sacks (surname)
- Saks (disambiguation)
- Saxe (disambiguation)
- Small-angle X-ray scattering (SAXS)
- Zaks (disambiguation)
- Zax (disambiguation)
