= Saxl =

Saxl is a surname. Notable people with the surname include:

- Erwin Saxl (1904–1981), American physicist and inventor
- Eva Saxl (1921–2002), Czech diabetes advocate
- Fritz Saxl (1890–1948), Austrian art historian
- Jan Saxl (1948–2020), Czech-British mathematician
- Michael V. Saxl, American lawyer and politician

== See also ==
- Sexl
- Sax (surname)
