= Florence Melton =

American inventor (1911–2007)

Florence Zacks Melton
- Born: Florence Spurgeon; November 6, 1911; Philadelphia, Pennsylvania, US
- Died: February 8, 2007 (aged 95); Boca Raton, Florida, US
- Occupations: Inventor, businesswoman.
- Years active: 1947–2007
- Known for: Dearfoams slippers
- Spouses: Aaron Zacks (m. 1930; died 1965) Samuel Mendel Melton (m. 1968; died 1993)
- Children: 2 (including Gordon Zacks)

Florence Zacks Melton (November 6, 1911 – February 8, 2007) was an American inventor known for innovating the foam-soled and washable slipper.

== Early life ==
Melton was born Florence to Meir and Rebecca Spurgeon in Philadelphia. Melton grew up in Philadelphia in an extremely poor family. Mostly under the care of her bubbie (grandmother) who encourage Jewish values and raised her. Music was a large part of Melton’s childhood which inspired her to study music, art, and ballet. She worked at a local Woolworth's from age 13 in order to support her family. She married her first husband, Aaron Zacks, when she was 19, and subsequently moved to Columbus, Ohio, where he worked as a merchandiser for a department store. Together they had two sons, Gordon and Barry.

== Career ==
Florence Melton with Rabbi Jason Miller of Congregation Agudas Achim of Columbus, Ohio

Melton served on the board of United Way (then the Red Feather Agency) and with the Red Cross Nutrition Corps. In the 1970s, she became the first woman to serve on the board of the Huntington National Bank and was a founding member of CAJE (the Coalition for the Advancement of Jewish Education).

Melton co-founded the R.G. Barry Corporation in 1946 with Zacks. While investigating foam latex, a material invented as a helmet liner for World War II tank crewmen, as a possible material for her patented women's shoulder pad, she discovered that she could use the material to line slippers. This foam latex was then made into slippers, which were made with washable terrycloth or velour that came in a variety of colors. Each slipper was different, some had a slightly raised heel, some had backs, some had straps, open toes and some had tassels. The common denominator was that they all had the same foam-rubber insoles that were at least half an inch thick. Marketed first as Angel Treads and later as Dearfoams, Melton's slippers were an immediate success; according to the company more than 1 billion slippers have been sold.

The slippers were not Melton’s only successful idea. Melton realized that the women’s fashion of a military style led to wearing double-breasted suits with padded shoulder. In order to clean these, shoulder pads had to be removed, then sewn back in. Melton came up with Shoulda-Shams, a cotton-batting shoulder pad with an elastic tab that could be snapped to a bra strap - ending the need for sewing.

Even though the slipper was Melton's idea, she was never given a role as an officer of the company; rather, her title was 'consultant.' However, she held the patent for the slipper - in addition to 18 other patents for products ranging from cushioning devices (such as the shoulder pads) and physical therapy devices. Before her death she served as a Product Development and Design consultant. she died in Boca Raton Florida in 2007 at 95.

Her son, author and speaker Gordon Zacks, served as the CEO of the company. He died on Feb. 1, 2014. Her other son, Barry Zacks, founded the Max & Erma's restaurant chain in 1972, before taking it public. He died in 1990.

== Philanthropy ==
In 1968, Melton married industrialist and philanthropist Samuel M. Melton. Samuel Melton endowed the Melton Research Center at the Jewish Theological Seminary of America and the Melton Centre at the Hebrew University of Jerusalem, where Melton became an active partner in her husband’s philanthropic projects. [3] Melton was very passionate about creating a program of study to help adults attain Jewish Literacy. Many were very skeptical of the need for teaching adults about Jewish culture; there were concerns about the number of adults who would be interested, or would even want to take the subject of Jewish Study as serious as the program outlined. Together, they created the "Florence Melton Adult Mini-School," a two-year, non-denominational program which operates in over 70 North American communities, Australia and South Africa.

In the mid 1980s, Melton initiated the "Discovery" program, which attempts to connect youths to their ancestry, community, different denominations in Judaism, and to Israel. The program involves extensive field trips and culminates in a tour of Israel. Melton was a member of the Commission on Jewish Education in North America.

== Melton Schools ==
Melton was the founder of the Florence Melton Adult Mini-School, a pluralistic adult learning program to enable adults to gain Jewish literacy through a broad and deep curriculum created by scholars and educators at Hebrew University in Jerusalem.
