= R.G. Barry Corporation =

Clothing company

- Industry: Footwear
- Founded: 1947
- Founders: Florence Melton; Aaron Zacks; Harry Streim
- Headquarters: Pickerington, Ohio
- Key people: Robert Mullaney (CEO); Elizabeth Ambargis (CFO); Matt Estey (COO); Devon Pike (President: Baggallini); Lee Smith (President: Columbus Product Group & Innovation); Corrine Baker (Senior Vice-President- DTC E-commerce & Marketplaces); Joe Bean (Senior Vice President- Wholesale & E-commerce)
- Brands: Dearfoams; Baggallini; Planet A; Columbus Product Group
- Number of employees: 154
- Website: rgbarry.com

R.G. Barry Corporation, stylized RG Barry, is a developer and marketer of footwear, handbags, and foot care products. It was founded by Florence Melton, Aaron Zacks, and Harry Streim in 1947 in Columbus, Ohio. Headquartered in Pickerington, Ohio, RGB is a consumer-driven, multi-channel, digitally-led brand management platform developed to accelerate growth and innovation for lifestyle consumer brands. More commonly known for their lifestyle brands, Baggallini and Dearfoams which focus on functional handbags and cozy slippers. While changing the standards for comfort, RGB also focuses on becoming an earth-first brand through their biodegradable brand Planet A, and innovations such as REGNR8.

== History ==
In the 1940s, Florence Melton had developed a removable shoulder pad. She, her husband Aaron Zacks, and businessman Harry Streim started a business called Shoulda-Moulders Co, and worked on developing slippers, bathrobes, and pillows. In 1947, the company was renamed to R.G. Barry, which was named after their children: Richard Streim, Gordon Zacks and Barry Zacks. In 1949, R.G. Barry released Angel Treads, the first foam-cushioned, washable slipper, as one of their featured products. The Dearfoams slipper brand was introduced in 1958. Following the launch of Dearfoams, R.G. Barry added operations in Puerto Rico, Tennessee, Texas, North Carolina, and New York, in an effort to boost company business.

R.G. Barry went public in 1962, and was listed in the American Stock Exchange. In 1965, Gordon Zacks became the company president, In 1974, they sold the Mushrooms brand sandals and footwear. They were the subject of a trademark lawsuit with Mushroom Makers, which sold women's sportswear. Sales of Mushrooms were reported to have peaked at $120 million in 1978. The company would later sell the Mushroom brand to United States Shoe Corporation in 1982.

In 1979, Gordon Zacks became Chairman of the Board and CEO Following a reorganization effort in the 1980s, Dearfoams launched a line of men's slippers and redesigned its women's line with an emphasis on “giftability” R.G. Barry also broadened its retail distribution, branching out from department stores to mass merchandisers like Kmart and Wal-Mart. The company launched a series of television commercials promoting Dearfoams. In 2004, Zacks stepped down from his position due to disappointing sales. The company had also closed its plants in Mexico. Thomas von Lehman served as the interim CEO, and in 2006, Greg Tunney, formerly with Phoenix Footwear, became the new CEO. In February 2008, the company switched its listings from American Stock Exchange to NASDAQ (Nasdaq: DFZ).

In January 2011, R.G. Barry acquired the Foot Petals brand, from a Long Beach-based insole maker. The company was founded by Tina Aldatz in 2001 with products for high heels wearers, and has since expanded to various footwear. In March 2011, R.G. Barry acquired the Baggallini brand, from a maker of handbags and travel accessories, in a $33.8 million deal. Baggallini was started in 1996 by two Delta Air Lines flight attendants, Dixie Powers and Ann Simmons, when they were selling currency bags to airline employees in airport lounges.

On September 3, 2014, R.G. Barry was taken private by Mill Road Capital and The Blackstone Group. In November 2017, Greg Tunney stepped down as CEO. Bob Mullaney, former COO of Shoes.com was named the CEO in December 2017. In 2017, the Pickerington City Council voted to help fund an upgrade to the company in order for it to keep its presence in the city and grow its employee base from 100 to 120 jobs.
