= Sachs =

Sachs is a German surname, meaning "man from Saxony". Sachs is a common surname among Ashkenazi Jews from Saxony, in the United States sometimes adopted in the variant Zaks, supposedly in reference to the Hebrew phrase Zera Kodesh Shemo (ZaKS), literally "his name is Holy Seed," a quotation from Isaiah 6:13.

Notable people with the surname Sachs include:

- Adriana Sachs (born 1993), Argentine professional footballer
- Albie Sachs (born 1935), South African Constitutional Court Justice
- Alexander Sachs (1893–1973), American economist
- Andrew Sachs (1930–2016), German-British actor
- Bernard Sachs (1858–1944), American neurologist
- Curt Sachs (also Kurth Sachs, 1881–1959), German music historian
- Ed Sachs (1918–1996), American professional basketball player
- Eddie Sachs (1927–1964), American racecar driver
- Edwin Sachs (1870–1919), British architect
- Ernest Sachs (1879–1958), American neurosurgeon
- Ernest Sachs, Jr. (1916–2001), American neurosurgeon
- Gunter Sachs (1932–2011), German photographer, researcher (mathematics and astrology), and playboy
- George Sachs (1896–1961), Russia-born German and US metallurgist
- Hans Sachs (disambiguation)
  - Hans Sachs (1494–1576), German poet
  - Hans Sachs (serologist) (1877–1945), German serologist
  - Hans Sachs (poster collector) (1881–1974), German poster collector
- Hanns Sachs (1881–1947), Austrian psychoanalyst; friend of Freud and author of The Creative Unconscious
- Harvey Sachs (born 1946), American-Canadian conductor and writer
- Heinrich Sachs (1863–1928), German neuroanatomist
- Hilda Sachs (1857–1935), Swedish journalist and women's rights activist
- Horst Sachs, German mathematician, expert in graph theory
- Hugh Sachs, British actor in the TV series Benidorm
- Ignacy Sachs (born 1927), Polish, naturalized French economist and ecosocioeconomist
- James D. Sachs, retired U.S. Air Force veteran, game artist, and game programmer
- Jeffrey Sachs (born 1954), American economist
- Johann Sachs (1843–1917), German composer
- Jonathan Sachs (born 1947), American computer programmer
- Julius von Sachs (1832–1897), German botanist
- Lenny Sachs (1897–1942), American football player and basketball coach
- Lessie Sachs (1897–1942), German-born poet and artist
- Leonard Sachs (1909–1990), British actor
- Marcus Sachs (1812–1869) Professor of Hebrew in Aberdeen
- Margaret Michaelis-Sachs (1902–1985), art photographer
- Margaret Sachs, American lawyer and professor at the University of Georgia
- Maria Sachs (born 1949), American politician
- Mary Sachs (1882–1973), American playwright and poet
- Maryam Diener-Sachs (born 1961), Iranian-born Swiss author
- Maurice Sachs (1906–1945), French author
- Mavro Sachs (1817–1888), Croatian physician
- Mendel Sachs (1927–2012), American physicist
- Michael Sachs (rabbi) (1808–1864), German rabbi
- Milan Sachs (1884–1968), Czech-Croatian opera conductor and composer
- Moses Sachs (1800–1870), German Meshulach
- Nelly Sachs (1891–1970), German poet
- Paul J. Sachs (1878–1965), American museum director
- Philip Sachs (1902–1973), American professional basketball coach
- Rainer K. Sachs (born 1932), German-born American scientist known for his work in astrophysics and biophysics
- Robin Sachs (1951–2013), British actor
- Salomo Sachs (1772–1855), Prussian architect and engineer
- Samuel Sachs (1851–1935), American investment banker, co-founder of Goldman Sachs
- Stephen Sachs (born 1959), American stage director and playwright
- Stephen H. Sachs (1934–2022), American politician and Attorney General of Maryland
- Wolfgang Sachs (born 1946), German researcher and author of books

Fictional characters:

- Andrea Sachs, created by Lauren Weisberger
- Daniel Sachs, from an online graphic novel Demonology 101
- Amelia Sachs, an NYPD police officer in the Lincoln Rhyme series of crime/mystery novels by Jeffery Deaver.
- Benjamin Sachs, protagonist in the novel Leviathan (Auster novel) by Paul Auster

== See also ==
- Goldman Sachs, a bank
- Gordon Zacks
- Sachs Electric, a Missouri electrical contractor
- Sachs Motorcycles
- Sachs Patera
- Sachse (disambiguation)
- Sacks (surname)
- Saks (disambiguation)
- Sax (disambiguation)
- Saxe (disambiguation)
- Small-angle X-ray scattering (SAXS)
- Zaks (disambiguation)
- Zaks, a building toy
- Zax (disambiguation)
- ZF Sachs AG, a company
