= Hans Sachs (disambiguation) =

Hans Sachs (1494–1576) was a German poet, the inspiration for the character in Lortzing's opera and in Wagner's Die Meistersinger von Nürnberg.

Hans Sachs may also refer to:

- Hans Sachs (serologist) (1877–1945), German serologist
- Hans Sachs (poster collector) (1881–1974), German poster collector

== See also ==
- Hanns Sachs (1881–1947), psychoanalyst; friend of Freud and author of The Creative Unconscious
