= Sexl =

Sexl is an Austrian surname. Notable people with the surname include:

- Martin Sexl (born 1966), Austrian literary scholar
- Roman Ulrich Sexl (1939–1986), Austrian theoretical physicist
- Theodor Sexl (1899–1967), Austrian theoretical physicist
- Veronika Sexl (born 1966), Austrian pharmacologist and toxicologist

== See also ==
- Saxl
