= Edward Saxe =

American businessman

Edward Lawrence Saxe (January 17, 1916 – July 27, 2002) was an American businessman.

Saxe graduated from Harvard (AB 1937) and Harvard Business School (MBA 1939). He served in the U.S. Army with various allied units during World War II and was decorated by the U.S., British, French and Belgian governments. His longest time of employment was from 1946-1973 during his career at CBS. Starting as Assistant to the Treasurer, over the years he worked his way up to being President of the CBS Television Services Division. After retirement from CBS he served as president and chairman to two start-up companies, notably Saxe Inc., a Denver-based database marketing company acquired by Metromail Corp. in 1997. He also served as a consultant to the National Security Council and to the Defense Department in matters relating to the organization of intelligence. In his later years, he was the director of the Museum of Modern Art and the president of the 52nd Harvard Club of New York City.
