= Edward Sachse =

Artist and lithographer (1804–1873)

Edward Sachse (1804 – 1873) was an artist and lithographer whose business E. Sachse & Co. in Baltimore, Maryland published prints of regional sights and cities. Works include a 12 sheet aerial view of Baltimore that employed several artists over a three-year period. The firm also produced a four sheet rendition of Syracuse. Prints of Washington D.C. include a version of the Washington Monument that was planned but never built.

He was born in 1804, in Görlitz, Germany. He and his company produced many colorful and skillful prints. One of his works is a large view of Baltimore printed on 12 sheets of paper.

He also produced a series of views of American Civil War era military encampments and hospitals in Baltimore and Washington, DC. They were sold relatively cheaply to soldiers who would sometimes mark their tents on the maps and send them home. Sachse issued revised editions when the units at the camps and setups changed.

== Gallery ==
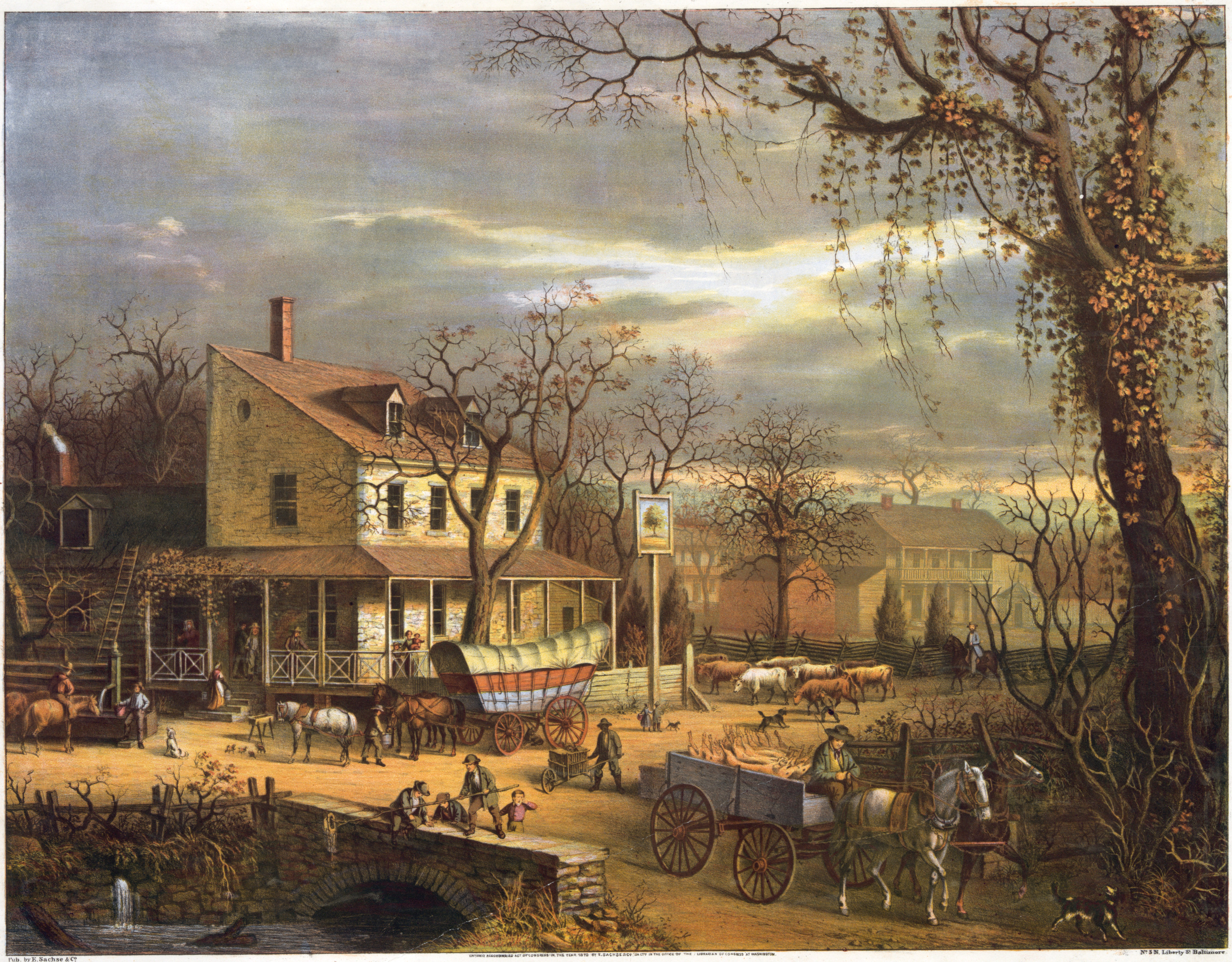
Roadside inn

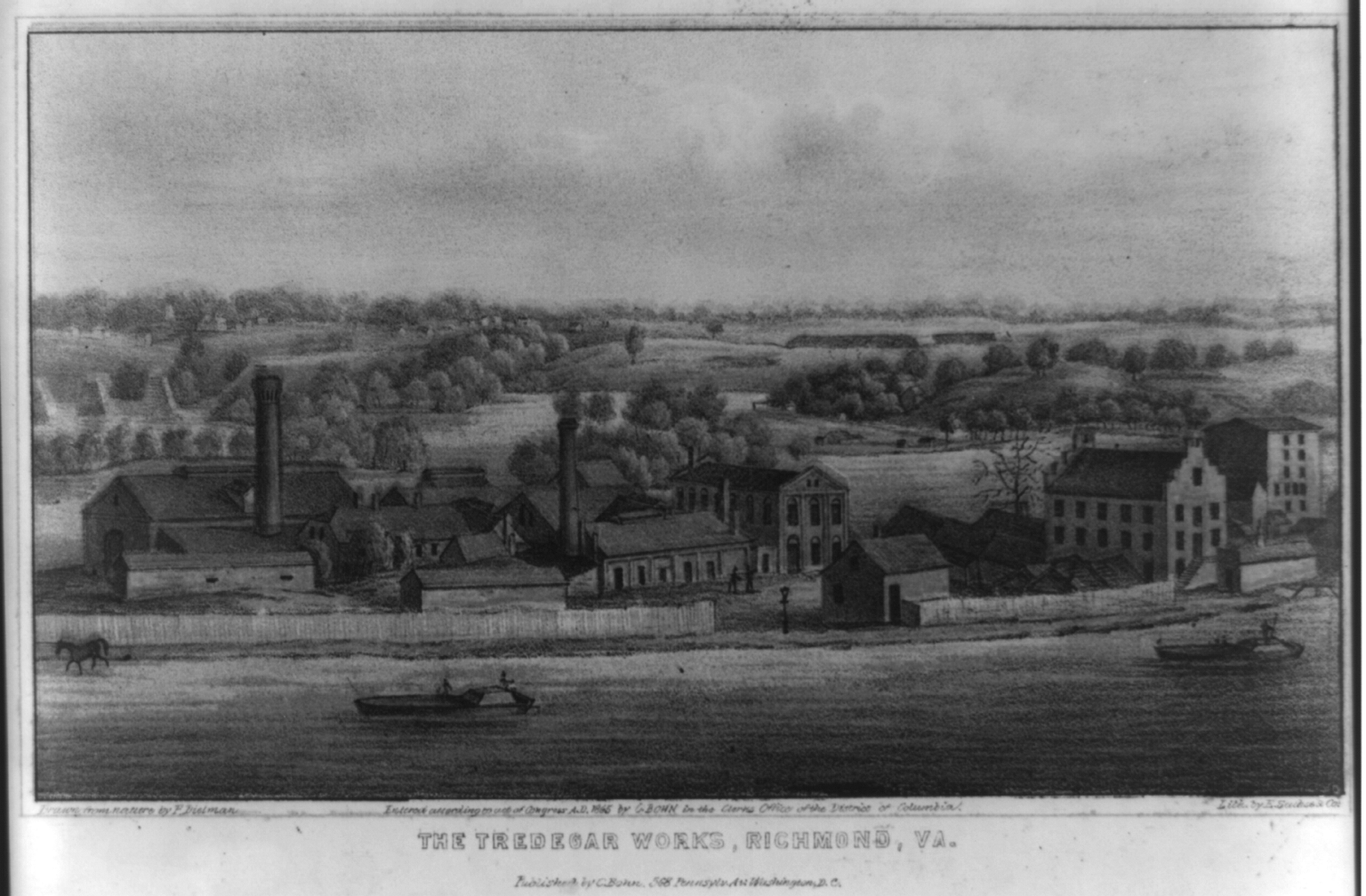
Tredegar Works in Richmond, Virginia drawn by F. Dielman? published by C. Bohn

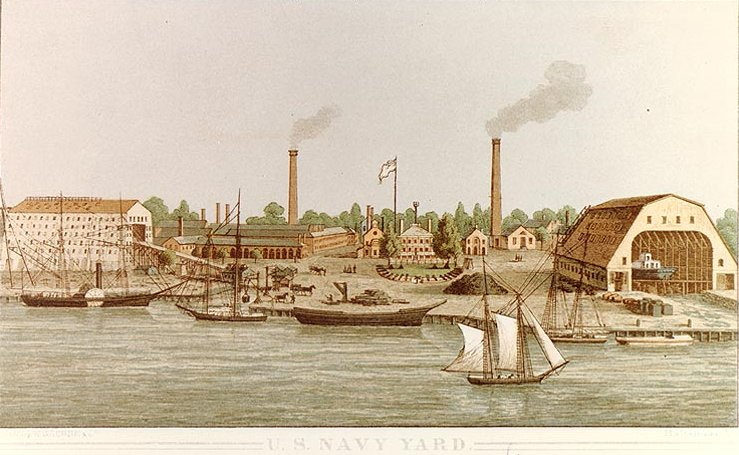
Washington Navy Yard published by Sachse

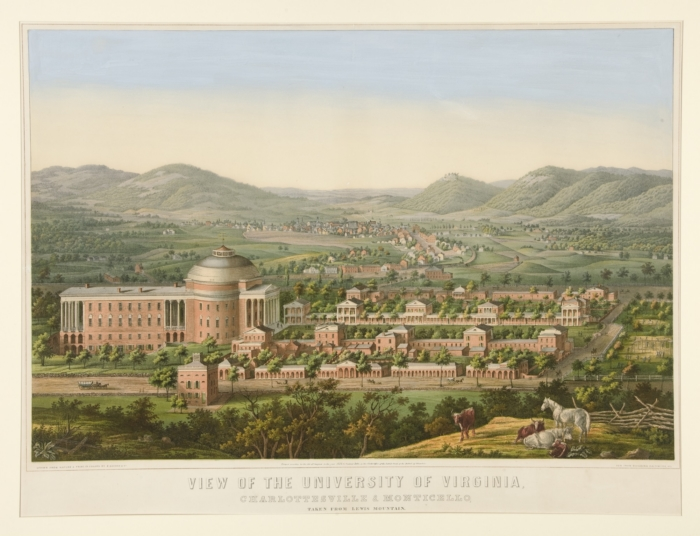
View of University of Virginia

Ink and wash drawing of Jefferson City
