= Hans Sachs (serologist) =

Hans Sachs (6 June 1877, Kattowitz (Katowice) – 25 March 1945, Dublin), was a German serologist. He was of Jewish ancestry.

== Early life and education ==
Sachs studied at the universities of Freiburg, Breslau (Wrocław) and Berlin. He was a student and research assistant of Paul Ehrlich. In 1900, he received his doctorate from the University of Leipzig.

== Career ==
From 1905, he taught and conducted research at the University of Frankfurt. He was promoted to professor in 1907 and became an honorary professor after 1914.

In 1920, he moved to Heidelberg, where he served as professor of the Institute for Immune and Serum Research and director of the scientific department of the Institute for Experimental Cancer Research. Sachs worked on investigations into the importance of lipoids for cancer immunity with Ernst Witebsky, who had been working in Heidelberg since 1925.

In 1935, he was expelled from the Institute and the University as part of the Nazi campaign to purge all Jews from academia. He fled Germany to Oxford in 1938 and later settled in Dublin, where he died in 1945.

== Achievements ==
His work in improving the diagnosis of syphilis was groundbreaking. In collaboration with other scientists, he developed the Sachs-Georgi reaction, a serological test for syphilis and a precipitation reaction test known as the Sachs-Witebsky reaction.
