= Sacks (surname) =

Sacks (/sæks/; German: [zaks]) is a German surname meaning "man from Saxony" and may refer to:

- Alan Sacks, American television producer
- Andrew Sacks, American attorney
- C. Jared Sacks, American founder of Channel Classics Records
- David O. Sacks (born 1972), South Africa-born American internet businessman and film producer
- David Sacks (writer), American television writer and producer
- Gerald Sacks (1933–2019), American logician
- Greg Sacks (born 1952), American racing car driver
- Harvey Sacks (1935–1975), American sociologist
- Hayley Anne Sacks (born 1991), American figure skater who competed for Israel
- Joel Sacks (b. 1989), Argentine association football player
- Jonathan Sacks (1948–2020), British Rabbi
- Leon Sacks (1902–1972), American politician
- Leslie Sacks (1952–2013), American art dealer and collector
- Mark Sacks (1953–2008), British philosopher
- Martin Sacks (born 1959), Australian actor
- Michael Sacks (born 1948), American actor
- Mike Sacks, American author, humor writer, and magazine editor
- Nathan Sacks (born 1959), South African association football player
- Oliver Sacks (1933–2015), English-born American neurologist and author
- Peter M. Sacks (born 1950), South African-born American artist and poet
- Rodney Sacks (born 1949/1950), American businessman
- Ruth Sacks (born 1977), South African artist
- Yonason Sacks (born 1962), American rabbi

== See also ==
- Sachs, a variant of the surname Sacks
- Sachse, Texas, United States
- Sack (disambiguation)
- Saks (disambiguation)
- Sax (disambiguation)
- Saxe (disambiguation)
- Small-angle X-ray scattering (SAXS)
- Zaks (disambiguation)
- Zaks, a building toy
- Zax (disambiguation)
