= Zaks =

Construction toy

A cartoon character built entirely with Zaks triangles and squares.

Zaks is a construction toy originally produced in Canada by the company Irwin Toy in 1987 and released in the United States by Ohio Art Company in 1988. The toy is a system of multicolored flat plastic triangle and square pieces that interlock via snap lock hinges along their edges, creating moveable structures. The toy includes additional pieces such as columnar joint attachments, push-in eyes, clear bubbles, cones, and antennae.

== Overview ==
Zaks consists primarily of equilateral triangles and squares with toothed, hinged, and interlocking edges. The basic triangle and square shapes are further modified by having a number of different face styles, including holes or extended sockets that allow them to connect face-to-face. The toys can be attached to one another to build three-dimensional creations, with the edges either remaining rigid or being allowed to swivel. It is quite easy to create Platonic solids using Zaks, and the toys are useful to demonstrate how simple planes like triangles and squares can be used to create complex polyhedra. Since the pieces primarily connect with hinges, building a rigid structure takes some work, either by clever geometry or socketing together smaller polyhedra.

== Conception ==
Zaks (an acronym for Ziegler's Animated Konstruction System) was invented by Calgary designer Jim Ziegler. Ziegler's initial inspiration for Zaks came from visiting Expo 67 and walking through the American pavilion, a geodesic dome designed by Buckminster Fuller, and from Fuller's book Utopia or Oblivion. In Ziegler's words, "Fuller had a conviction that understanding triangulated geometry would be essential to man's success, because that's the most efficient way to build. My reasoning was that for people to accept that idea, they needed to have it in their hands and just play with it."

Ziegler had the idea for Zaks in 1982, while making a wooden jewelry box for his wife. He came up with 85% of the invention over two weeks. Over 18 months, he invested $70,000, half of it his own money, while working on the prototype as a hobby. He approached Irwin Toy, who were looking for a Canadian-designed toy that they could market globally. Irwin kept the toy's development secret due to its innovative quality and commercial potential; according to Irwin Toy vice-president George Irwin, "Only three or four people in the company knew about Zaks". The toy was named in October, 1986 and unveiled to retailers in January 1987.

== Release ==
Zaks was released in Canada in August 1987 and was an immediate success, becoming the eighth best-selling toy in Canada in 1987 and helping Irwin Toy recover from $2.6 million losses in 1985. Irwin Toy anticipated Zaks would become a $20 to $30 million business across North America within two years. Inventor Jim Ziegler suggested Zaks' compatibility with more established construction toys Lego and Tyco helped with their marketing. After the launch of Zaks, Lego released two television commercials featuring a boy named Zack, "a Lego maniac"; the ad campaign was perceived by some observers as an acknowledgment of Zaks' release. Zaks was distributed in the United States in 1988 by Ohio Art Company, and was also released in Europe and Australia.

By 1990, Zaks had reached sales of about $25 million but sales had slowed significantly. By 1995 Zaks had sold $28 million worldwide.

=== Sets ===
Irwin Toy initially released Zaks sets with 52, 144, 274, and 474 pieces, with prices ranging from about C$10 to C$40. Ohio Arts released 48, 96, 152 and 328 piece Zaks sets in 1988 and added 16 and 354 piece sets in 1989. Ohio Arts also released themed sets, including sets to build a magic circle, pink pig, masks, a dirt buggy, and a battle cruiser.

== Awards and recognition ==
Zaks won the Canadian Toy Testing Council Award of Merit as Best Construction Toy of 1987 and the 1988 Canada Award for Business Excellence Gold Medal in Industrial Design. Zaks was the Australian Toy Association 1988 Hobby and Craft winner and runner-up for Toy of the Year.

The Center for Science in the Public Interest gave Zaks its 1988 Hubbard Lemon Award for misleading advertising in the Toys category. A spokesman for the awards stated that "Zaks simply can't be made to do the wild gyrations that appear in the commercial". Ohio Art Company responded that they "try to show in the television commercial that the product can be animated and that the pieces move after they're put together."

Zaks was included in the exhibition "Art in Everyday Life: Observations on Contemporary Canadian Design" held at The Power Plant art gallery from June 24 to September 11, 1988, and in the exhibition's accompanying book. The exhibition was a curated survey exploring mass-produced objects designed in Canada from 1967 to 1987.
