= Sachse =

Sachse may refer to:

- Sachse, Texas
- People from Saxony (German: Sachsen)
- Anna Sachse-Hofmeister (1850–1904), Austrian opera singer
- Arthur Sachse (1860–1920), Australian politician
- Edward Sachse (1804-1873), artist and lithographer
- Emma Sachse (1887–1965), German activist and politician
- Frank Sachse (1917–1989), American basketball and football player
- Jack Sachse, American football player
- Jessica Sachse, German paralympic athlete
- Jochen Sachse (born 1948), East German athlete, winner of silver medal in hammer throw at 1972 Olympics
- Neil Sachse (1951–2020), Australian rules footballer
- Rainer Sachse (born 1950), German footballer
- Salli Sachse (1943–2025), American actress, model, and photographer
- Willy Sachse (1896–1944), German socialist

== See also ==
- Sachs, a surname
