= Gordon Zacks =

American businessman and presidential advisor

- Born: March 11, 1933; Indiana, U.S.
- Died: February 1, 2014 (aged 80) near Columbus, Ohio
- Occupation: Businessman
- Board member of: R.G. Barry Corporation

Gordon Zacks (March 11, 1933 – February 1, 2014) was an American businessman, author and presidential adviser.

== Life ==
Born in Indiana, Zacks lived in Bexley, Ohio. He graduated from Ohio State University.

== Business ==
His mother, Florence Melton, was an inventor and with Gordon's father started the R.G. Barry Corporation: the world's largest supplier of comfort footwear. Zacks served as chairman of the board of R. G. Barry since 1979. He also served as president and chief executive officer for 24 years until 2004, when he stepped down due to disappointing sales.

== Politics ==
An expert on the Middle East and staunch advocate of Israel, he served as an adviser to George H. W. Bush in several capacities: from 1987 to 1988, he served as national chairman of the Bush for President National Jewish Campaign Committee and co-chairman of the Bush for President National Finance Committee, he was vice-chairman of the Bush/Quayle National Finance Committee and co-chairman of the Middle East Policy Task Force, from 1991 to 1992 he served as chairman of the US and Foreign Commercial Service Advisory Committee, he served on the President's Advisory Committee for Trade Policy and Negotiation for thirteen years, and he served on the George Bush Presidential Library board of trustees. In more recent political history, he supported several Republican campaigns: he donated money to George W. Bush's 2000 presidential campaign and John McCain's 2008 presidential bid.

== Author ==
Zacks is the author of Defining Moments: Stories of Character, Courage, and Leadership , a collection of essays on leadership, was published in 2006 by Beaufort Books. During the last month of his life, Gordon Zacks authored a second book called "Redefining Moments" which was scheduled to be published on July 14, 2014.

== Death ==
In December 2013, doctors discovered that the prostate cancer that Zacks had suffered from for five years had spread to his liver. Zacks died at his home on February 1, 2014, aged 80.
