= Countess Palatine Elisabeth of Simmern-Sponheim =

Elisabeth of Simmern-Sponheim
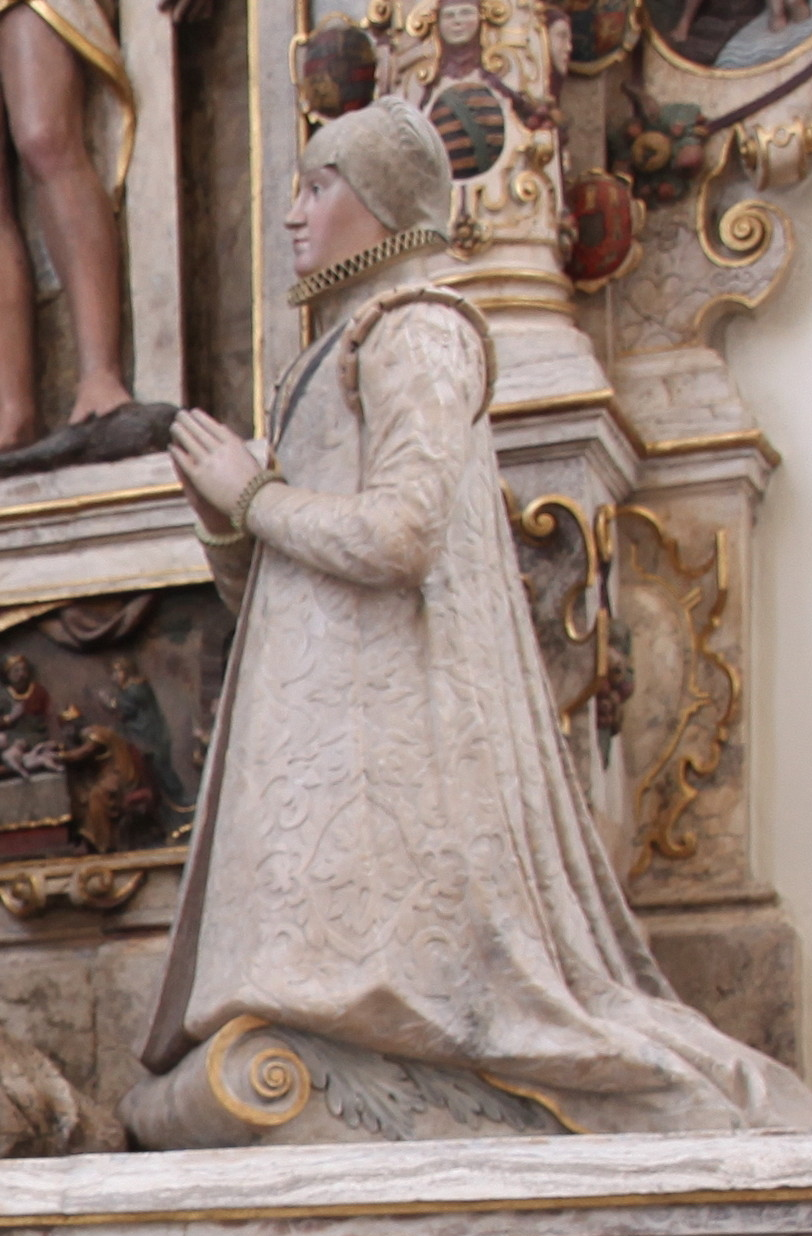
- Sculpture of Elisabeth kneeling, epitaph in the Maurice Church in Coburg

Duchess consort of Saxony
- Tenure: 1558–1566
- Born: 30 June 1540; Birkenfeld
- Died: 8 February 1594 (aged 53); Wiener Neustadt
- Burial: Morizkirche, Coburg
- Spouse: John Frederick II, Duke of Saxony (m. 1558)
- Issue among others...: John Casimir, Duke of Saxe-Coburg; John Ernest, Duke of Saxe-Eisenach
- House: Wittelsbach
- Father: Frederick III, Elector Palatine
- Mother: Marie of Brandenburg-Kulmbach

Elisabeth of the Palatinate (German: Elisabeth von der Pfalz; 30 June 1540 in Birkenfeld – 8 February 1594 in Wiener Neustadt) was the second wife of John Frederick II, Duke of Saxony.

== Life ==
Elisabeth was born in Birkenfeld, the daughter of Frederick III, Elector Palatine, and his wife, Marie of Brandenburg-Kulmbach. Elisabeth was the third child of the couple and the second to reached adulthood.

On 12 June 1558 in Weimar, Elisabeth married John Frederick II, Duke of Saxony, eldest son of John Frederick I, Elector of Saxony. He selected Grimmenstein Castle (the predecessor of Friedenstein Castle) in Gotha as their residence. During the Gotha War, Augustus, Elector of Saxony, besieged Gotha and Grimmenstein Castle and conquered them on 13 April 1567. John Frederick was taken prisoner and would spend the rest of his life (29 years) in imperial captivity. He was brought to Dresden and in June 1567 to Wiener Neustadt. Elisabeth and her children fled to Eisenach and then to her sister Dorothea Susanne of Simmern, who was married to her husband's brother, John William, Duke of Saxe-Weimar. At the end of 1568, she moved back to Eisenahch, initially to the Zollhof court, then to the Wartburg and finally into the castle at Eisenberg

In the following years, Elisabeth wrote a number of petitions to, among others, Emperor Maximilian II, Empress Maria and Anne, Electress of Saxony, trying to obtain the release of her husband. With the help of her father and brothers, she appeared before the Diet of Speyer (1570). She was allowed to prostrate in front of Emperor Maximilian II at her father's Heidelberg Castle. The Emperor then reinstated her sons as Imperial Princes. Duke John William I acted as their guardian until the Division of Erfurt was made on 6 November 1572. After that Division, their guardians were Elector John George of Brandenburg (succeeded in 1578 by his nephew Margrave George Frederick I of Brandenburg-Ansbach) and Elector Palatine Frederick III and Elector Augustus of Saxony, who provided them with an education under his supervision and in his spirit.

In the summer of 1572, Elisabeth moved in with her husband in captivity in the castle of Wiener Neustadt. From there, she has returned twice more to Coburg. On 5 August 1572, her son Frederick Henry died in Eisenberg. Her two youngest sons John Casimir and John Ernest moved into the Ehrenburg Palace at Coburg on 5 December 1572, where they were raised by under the governorship of Count Barby, who was a confidant of Augustus.

In June and July 1578, Elisabeth traveled via Prague, where they unsuccessfully tried to meet Dowager Empress Maria, to Coburg where she met with her younger sister Dorothea Susanna. In 1583, Elisabeth traveled in the period from March to August, via Prague and Coburg to Weimar to attend on 5 May at the wedding of Frederick William I, Duke of Saxe-Weimar, with Sophie of Württemberg, and to meet Elector Augustus. However, the Elector cancelled the appointment. On her return journey, she visited her brother Louis VI, Elector Palatine, in Heidelberg, where she was accompanied by her sons.

Elisabeth died on 8 February 1594 in the armory of Wiener Neustadt. Her body was repatriated to Coburg at the end of the year and buried in the Morizkirche on 30 December 1594. In 1598, Duke John Casimir had a twelve-meter-high alabaster epitaph by the sculptor Nikolaus Bergner erected on the tomb of Elisabeth and John Frederick, who had died in 1595.

== Marriage and issue ==
On 12 June 1558 in Weimar, Elisabeth married John Frederick II, Duke of Saxony, the eldest son of John Frederick I, Elector of Saxony. The couple had four sons:

- John Frederick (30 November 1559, Weimar - 8 August 1560, Weimar)
- Frederick Henry (3 February 1563, Heldburg - 4 August 1572, Eisenberg)
- John Casimir, Duke of Saxe-Coburg (12 June 1564, Gotha - 16 July 1633, Coburg); married in 1586 Anna of Saxony. The couple divorced in 1593, after which he married Margaret of Brunswick-Lüneburg in 1599.
- John Ernest, Duke of Saxe-Eisenach (9 July 1566, Gotha - 23 October 1638, Eisenach); married in 1591 Elisabeth of Mansfeld-Hinterort. Elisabeth died in 1596, and in 1598, he married Christine of Hesse-Kassel.
