= Elisabeth of Mansfeld-Hinterort =

Duchess consort of Saxe-Coburg-Eisenach
- Tenure: 1591-1596
- Born: 1565; Mansfeld
- Died: 12 April 1596 (aged 31); Marksuhl
- Spouse: John Ernest, Duke of Saxe-Coburg-Eisenach
- Issue: John Frederick, Hereditary Prince of Saxe-Coburg-Eisenach
- House: Mansfeld
- Father: John, Count of Mansfeld-Hinterort
- Mother: Margaret of Brunswick-Lüneburg

Elisabeth of Mansfeld-Hinterort (1565 – 12 April 1596), was a German noblewoman member of the House of Mansfeld and by marriage Duchess of Saxe-Coburg-Eisenach.

Born in Mansfeld, she was a daughter of John, Count of Mansfeld-Hinterort and his second wife Margaret, a daughter of Ernest I, Duke of Brunswick-Lüneburg.

== Life ==
In Wiener Neustadt on 23 November 1591, Elisabeth married John Ernest, Duke of Saxe-Coburg-Eisenach with his brother. They had one son:

- John Frederick, Hereditary Prince of Saxe-Coburg-Eisenach (b. and d. Marksuhl, 8 April 1596)

Four days later, Elisabeth died at age 31, probably from childbirth complications. She was buried in Creuzburg alongside her son.

Elisabeth of Mansfeld-Hinterort House of Mansfeld Born: 1565 Died: 12 April 1596
German royalty
| New creation | Duchess consort of Saxe-Coburg-Eisenach; 1591-1596; With: Anna of Saxony until 1593 | Vacant Title next held by Christine of Hesse-Kassel as Duchess of Saxe-Eisenach |
| New creation | Duchess consort of Saxe-Coburg-Eisenach; 1591-1596; With: Anna of Saxony until 1593 | Vacant Title next held by Margaret of Brunswick-Lüneburg as Duchess of Saxe-Coburg |
