= John Casimir, Duke of Saxe-Coburg =

John Casimir
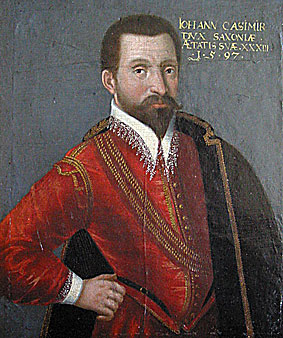
- Anonymous portrait, 1597

Duke of Saxe-Coburg-Eisenach
- Reign: 1572–1596
- Successor: Split into Saxe-Coburg and Saxe-Eisenach

Duke of Saxe-Coburg
- Reign: 1596–1633
- Successor: John Ernest of Saxe-Eisenach
- Born: 12 June 1564; Gotha
- Died: 16 July 1633 (aged 69); Coburg
- Burial: Morizkirche, Coburg
- Spouse: Anna of Saxony; Margaret of Brunswick-Lüneburg
- House: House of Wettin
- Father: John Frederick II, Duke of Saxony
- Mother: Countess Palatine Elisabeth of Simmern-Sponheim
- Religion: Lutheran

John Casimir of Saxe-Coburg (Gotha, 12 June 1564 – Coburg, 16 July 1633) was the Duke of Saxe-Coburg. He was a descendant of the Ernestine branch of the House of Wettin. Under his rule, the town of Coburg prospered and many Renaissance buildings were erected that still remain today.

== Youth ==
John Casimir was born at Grimmenstein Castle in Gotha on 12 June 1564 as the third son of Duke John Frederick II, Duke of Saxony and his wife Countess Palatine Elisabeth of Simmern-Sponheim. Because of the Holy Roman Empire's sanctions (Reichsexekution) against Gotha, his father lost his dominions and freedom on 15 April 1567. Subsequently, John Casimir lived with his brothers, Frederick Henry (who died in 1572 at the age of 11) and John Ernest, and their mother, first in Eisenach, then at the court of the children's guardian, their uncle John William, Weimar, and finally in Eisenberg, Thuringia. In 1570 the Diet of Speyer restored to the brothers the rights and privileges of their father. Two years later, in the summer of 1572, their mother moved to Austria to join her husband in captivity. A few months later, on 6 November 1572, her two sons were awarded by the Division of Erfurt the Principality of Saxe-Coburg-Eisenach. The Principality consisted of southern and western areas of Thuringia, including the cities of Eisenach, Gotha and Hildburghausen. The additional guardians of the children were John George, Elector of Brandenburg (since 1578 Margrave George Frederick of Brandenburg-Anspach) and the material grandfather, Frederick III, Elector of the Palatinate, and also the enemy of his father, Augustus, Elector of Saxony, who supervised the education of John Casimir as well as the regency of the new Principality in Coburg. John Casimir and his brother moved to Coburg on 5 December 1572. His guardians undersigned in the name of John Casimir the Formula of Concord (Konkordienformel) of 1577 and the Book of Concord (Konkordienbuch) of 1580, the two authoritative statements of the Lutheran faith.

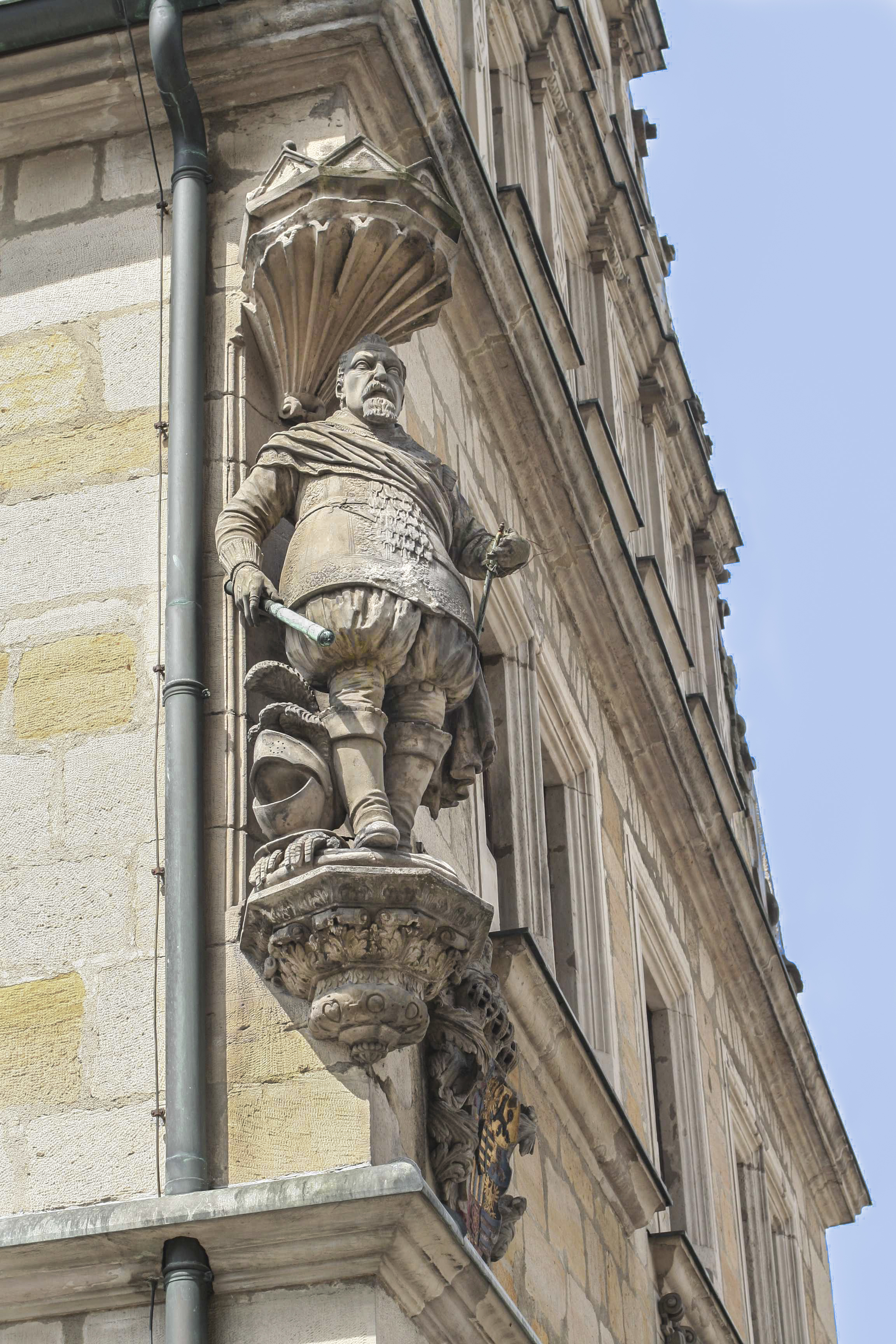
Statue of Duke John Casimir at the Casimirianum

Between 1578 and 1581 Johann Casimir studied at the University of Leipzig. On 6 May 1584 he became engaged, without the consent of his father, to Anna, the daughter of Augustus of Saxony, whom he married on 16 January 1586 in Dresden. Only after the death of the Elector Augustus of Saxony on 11 February 1586 was Duke John Casimir able to undertake the government of the Principality with the assistance of his brother, John Ernest.

== Reign ==
In 1596 the brothers divided the Principality in two. John Ernest was given the Principality of Saxe-Eisenach and Casimir continued to reign alone in Coburg. His dominions were composed of the districts of Coburg with the subdivisions of Lauter, Rodach and Gestungshausen bei Sonnefeld, Heldburg with a subdivision of Hildburghausen, Römhild, Eisfeld, Schalkau, Sonneberg, Neustadt, Neuhaus, Mönchröden and Sonnefeld.

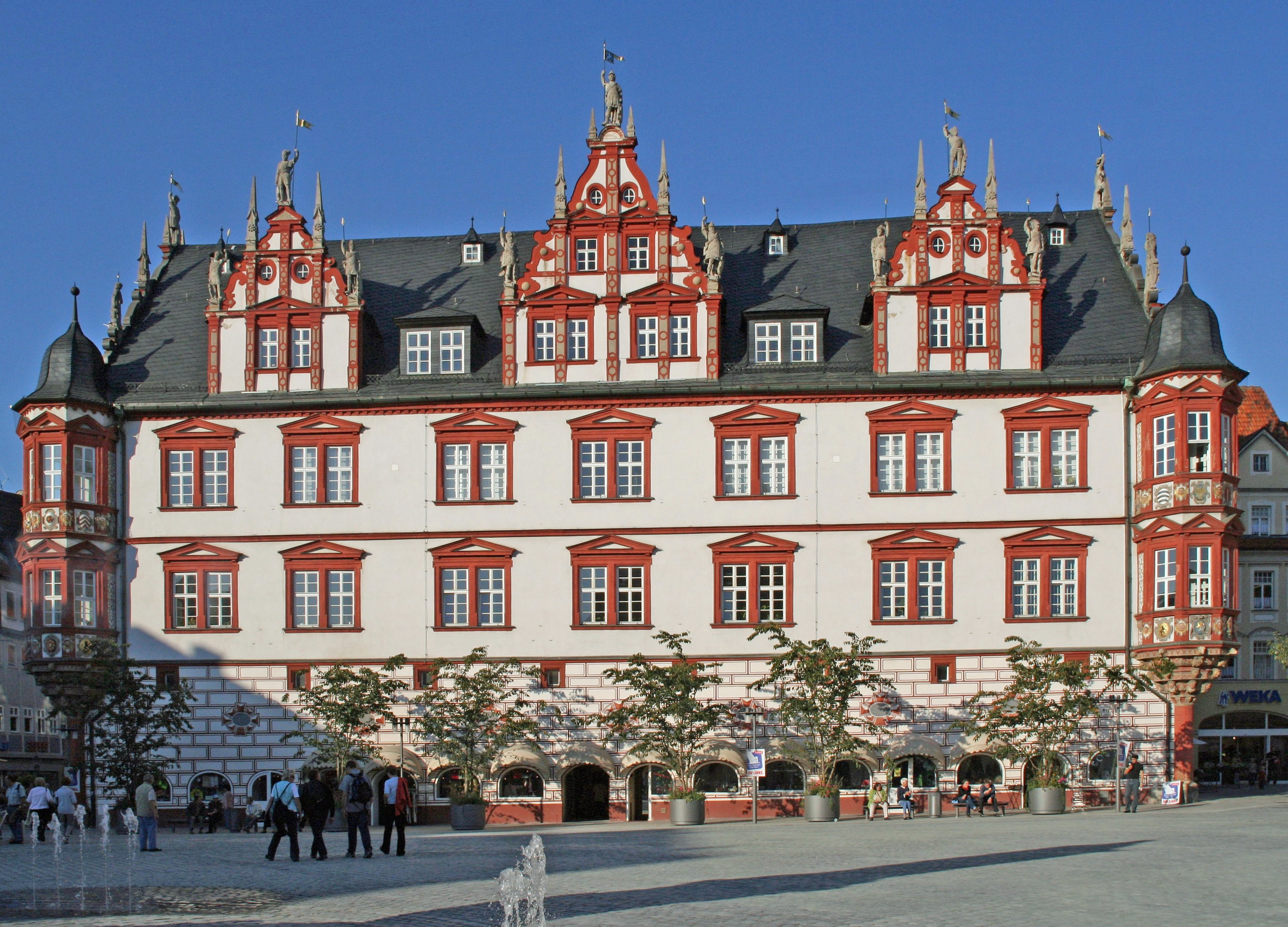
Government buildings, now the Stadthaus (town house), at the Marktplatz (Market Square)

Under John Casimir, the city of his residence, Coburg, had its first cultural peak with a boost to construction. The Schloss Ehrenburg was rebuilt in the Renaissance style as the Stadtschloss (town castle). The former Schloss Callenberg was expanded into a hunting lodge; its chapel was consecrated in 1618 as the first Protestant sanctuary in Coburg. The Veste Coburg was converted to a ducal fortress, and the arsenal as well as the government buildings (Stadthaus) were rebuilt at the Marktplatz (Market Square). The choir of Morizkirche was gifted a huge Renaissance epitaph by John Casimir in 1598 in honor of his parents – a 12-meter-tall (39-feet-tall) alabaster monument with a richly sculptured series of pictures. In addition, he founded the Gymnasium Casimirianum, extended the castle’s library to include his inheritance of book collections and in 1603 hired the composer Melchior Franck as the Hofkapellmeister (court master of music). The court’s household, for a time, held 213 people and 130 horses.

Politically, John Casimir succeeded in getting the Reichsritterschaft (Community of the Imperial Knights) to submit to his sovereignty by guaranteeing their jurisdiction over their country estates. He issued the order to establish the State Lutheran Church with the Duke as the summus episcopus (Latin, “highest bishop”), a tactic later adopted by many of the Thuringian states. As the only supreme authority of justice and religion in the Principality, IN 1589 he built an Hofgericht (Special Court for the Nobles), an Appellationsrat (Court of Appeals), a Schöppenstuhl (Court of Justice) and in 1593 added a consistory for the Lutheran Church which also covered Saxe-Weimar but remained in Jena.

Above all, he built an administrative apparatus in his government in Coburg which persisted after his death and survived many political upheavals. Duke Casimir managed to remain neutral in the Thirty Years War until 1631. After he joined the Protestant side under Sweden, the Imperial and Bavarian troops under Wallenstein carried out the occupation of Coburg and the unsuccessful siege of the Veste in 1632.

During his reign, witch trials and burnings were at their height. He allowed 178 witch trials to proceed. In 1593 Duke John Casimir divorced his first wife for adultery and he then held her captive until her death at the Veste. In 1599, he married Margaret, the daughter of William, Duke of Brunswick-Lüneburg. He had a marriage medal struck in honor of his bride. John died in Coburg on 16 July 1633. Because he was childless, his inheritance fell to his brother John Ernst of Saxe-Eisenach.

He is buried in Morizkirche at Coburg. His coffin is in the crypt below the church.

== Ancestry ==
Ancestors of John Casimir, Duke of Saxe-Coburg

8. John, Elector of Saxony
4. John Frederick I, Elector of Saxony
9. Sophie of Mecklenburg
2. John Frederick II, Duke of Saxony
10. John III, Duke of Cleves
5. Sibylle of Cleves
11. Maria of Jülich-Berg
1. John Casimir, Duke of Saxe-Coburg
12. John II, Count Palatine of Simmern
6. Frederick III, Elector Palatine
13. Beatrice of Baden
3. Countess Palatine Elisabeth of Simmern-Sponheim
14. Casimir, Margrave of Brandenburg-Bayreuth
7. Marie of Brandenburg-Kulmbach
15. Susanna of Bavaria

== Literature ==
- (de) Thomas Nicklas: Das Haus Sachsen-Coburg – Europas späte Dynastie (The House of Saxe-Coburg – Europe’s Last Dynasty). Stuttgart, Kohlhammer Verlag, 2003, ISBN 3-17-017243-3.
- (de) Gerhard Heyl: Johann Casimir In: Neue Deutsche Biographie (NDB), Band 10 (New German Biography [NDB], Volume 10). Berlin, Duncker & Humblot, 1974, p. 531 ff.
- (de) August Beck: Johann Casimir (Herzog von Sachsen-Coburg). In: Allgemeine Deutsche Biographie (ADB), Band 14 (General German Biography [ADB], Volume 14). Leipzig, Duncker & Humblot, 1881, pp. 369–372.
- (de) Herzog Johann Casimir von Sachsen-Coburg 1564 - 1633; Ausstellung zur 400. Wiederkehr seines Geburtstages (Duke John Casimir of Saxe-Coburg 1564 - 1633; Exhibition of the 400th Anniversary of His Birth); October–November 1964 (exhibition catalog), edited by the Art Collections of the Veste Coburg.
- Hans-Joachim Böttcher: WENIG UND BÖS WAR DIE ZEIT MEINES LEBENS - Anna von Sachsen (1567-1613), Dresden 2016, ISBN 978-3-941 757-70-7.
