= Johann Wilhelm, Duke of Saxe-Weimar =

Johann Wilhelm
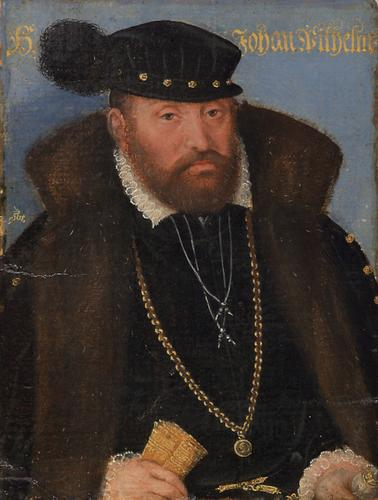
- Anonymous portrait of Johann Wilhelm (c. 1550–1573)

Duke of Saxony
- Reign: November 1566–1572
- Predecessor: Johann Friedrich II

Duke of Saxe-Weimar
- Reign: 1572 – 2 March 1573
- Successor: Friedrich Wilhelm I
- Born: 11 March 1530; Torgau, Electorate of Saxony, Holy Roman Empire
- Died: 2 March 1573 (aged 42); Weimar, Saxe-Weimar, Holy Roman Empire
- Spouse: Dorothea Susanne of Simmern
- Issue among others: Friedrich Wilhelm I, Duke of Saxe-Weimar; Johann II, Duke of Saxe-Weimar; Maria, Abbess of Quedlinburg
- House: Wettin (Ernestine Line)
- Father: Johann Friedrich I, Elector of Saxony
- Mother: Sibylle of Cleves

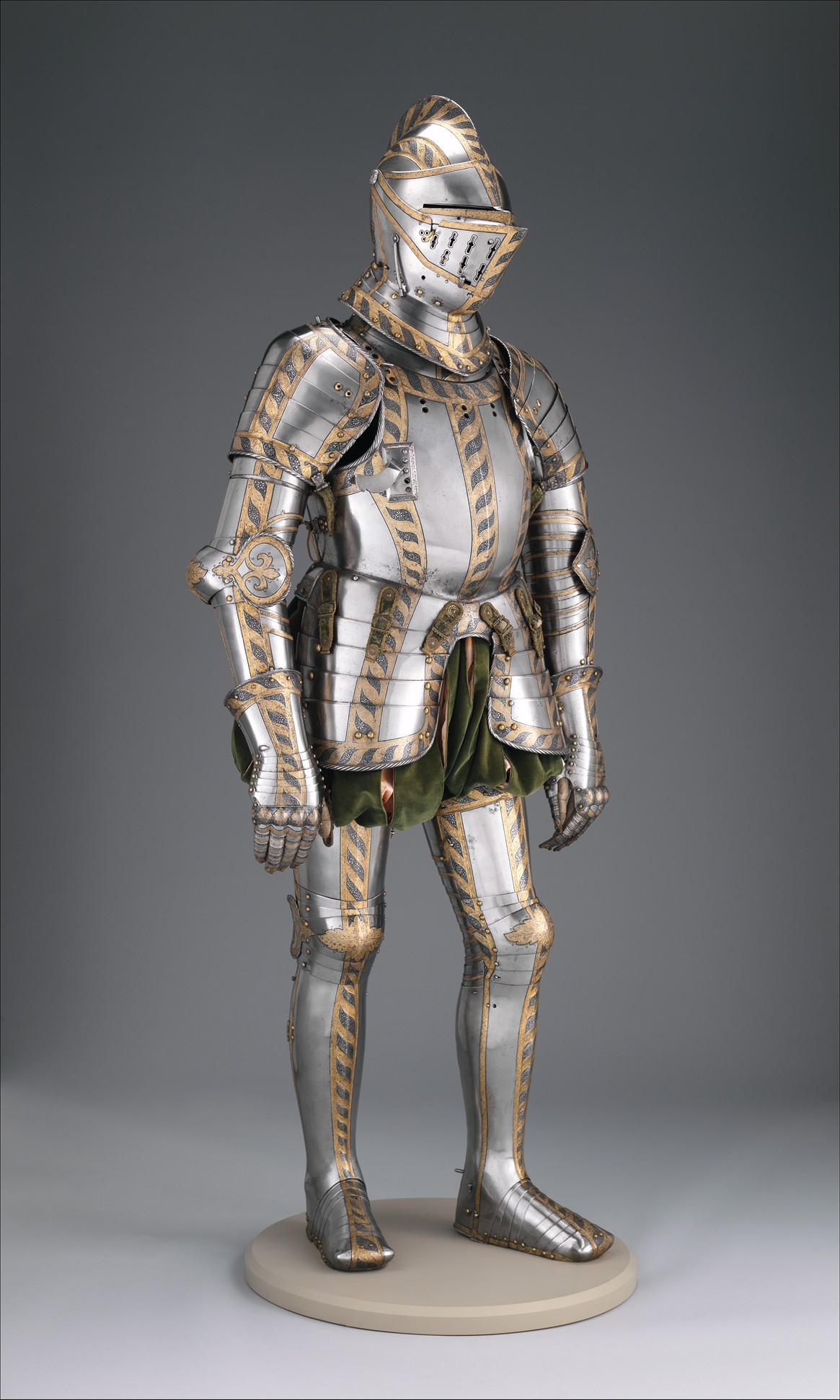
Field and Tournament Armor of Johann Wilhelm (1530–1573), Duke of Saxe-Weimar

Johann Wilhelm (11 March 1530 – 2 March 1573) was a duke of Saxe-Weimar who became heavily involved in Imperial politics after his brother Johann Friedrich II was imprisoned. Although expected to defend Protestant interests, he alienated both the Emperor and his subjects by serving as a general for the Catholic king Charles IX of France in campaigns against the Huguenots. His political missteps led to Imperial distrust and resulted in the Division of Erfurt (1572), which split the duchy into three parts between him and his brother's two sons. Johann Wilhelm retained Weimar and gained Altenburg, Gotha, and Meiningen, but lost other territories.

== Life ==
He was the second son of Johann Frederick I, Elector of Saxony, and Sibylle of Cleves.

At the time of his birth, his father still carried the title Elector of Saxony, but he lost it in 1547 after his defeat and capture by the Emperor Charles V due to his support of the Protestant Reformation. John Frederick was released and forced to adopt the lesser title of duke of Saxony in an area substantially smaller than his former lands in Thuringia. In 1554, after the death of his father, Johann Wilhelm inherited the duchy of Saxony with his older brother, Johann Friedrich II, and his younger brother, Johann Friedrich III.

The three brothers divided the duchy: Johann Friedrich II as head of the family took Eisenach and Coburg; Johann Wilhelm received Weimar; and Johann Friedrich III inherited Gotha. In 1565, however, when Johann Frederick III died without heirs, the two surviving brothers drew up a new treaty that divided his lands. The older brother retained his original lands and occupied Gotha, whereas Johann William retained his lands in Weimar. The partition plan also stipulated that the two brothers should exchange their regions among themselves every three years. This provision was never carried out, however.

The political policies of Johann Friedrich II were directed towards recovering the lands and title of elector lost by his father in 1547. He did briefly recover the electorate during the period 1554–1556, but his involvement in political intrigues angered the Emperor Maximilian II. The Emperor finally imposed the Reichsacht (Imperial ban) on him, which made him the object of a Reichsexekution (Imperial police action) in which Johann Wilhelm participated. After a siege of his castle in Gotha, Johann Friedrich was finally defeated in 1566 and spent the rest of his life as an Imperial prisoner. His possessions were confiscated by the Emperor and handed over to Johann Wilhelm, who thereby became the only ruler of the entire duchy of Saxony.

Johann Wilhelm soon fell into disfavor with the Emperor, however, when he entered the service of the King Charles IX of France as a general in his campaign against the Huguenots (the French kings were the enemies of the Habsburg emperors). This also alienated his Protestant subjects. Johann Wilhelm was a member of the House of Wettin, which had served as the protecting power of Protestantism in Germany since the time of Frederick the Wise, yet he allied himself with the Catholic King of France against the Protestants Huguenots.

The Emperor played off the two surviving sons of Johann Friedrich II against Johann Wilhelm, and in 1572 the Division of Erfurt was concluded. The duchy of Saxony was divided into three parts. The older of the two sons of Johann Friedrich II, Johann Casimir, received Coburg, and the younger, Johann Ernst, received Eisenach. Johann Wilhelm retained only the smaller part of the duchy, the region around Weimar, but he added the districts of Altenburg, Gotha, and Meiningen to his territories. As a result of the Division of Erfurt, all of the territorial possessions of the House of Wettin, no matter which branch ruled the individual components, became contiguous. The house of Saxe-Weimar and the first house of Saxe-Altenburg, which later separated from Saxe-Weimar (see also the Ernestine duchies), both descend from Johann Wilhelm.

== Marriage and issue ==
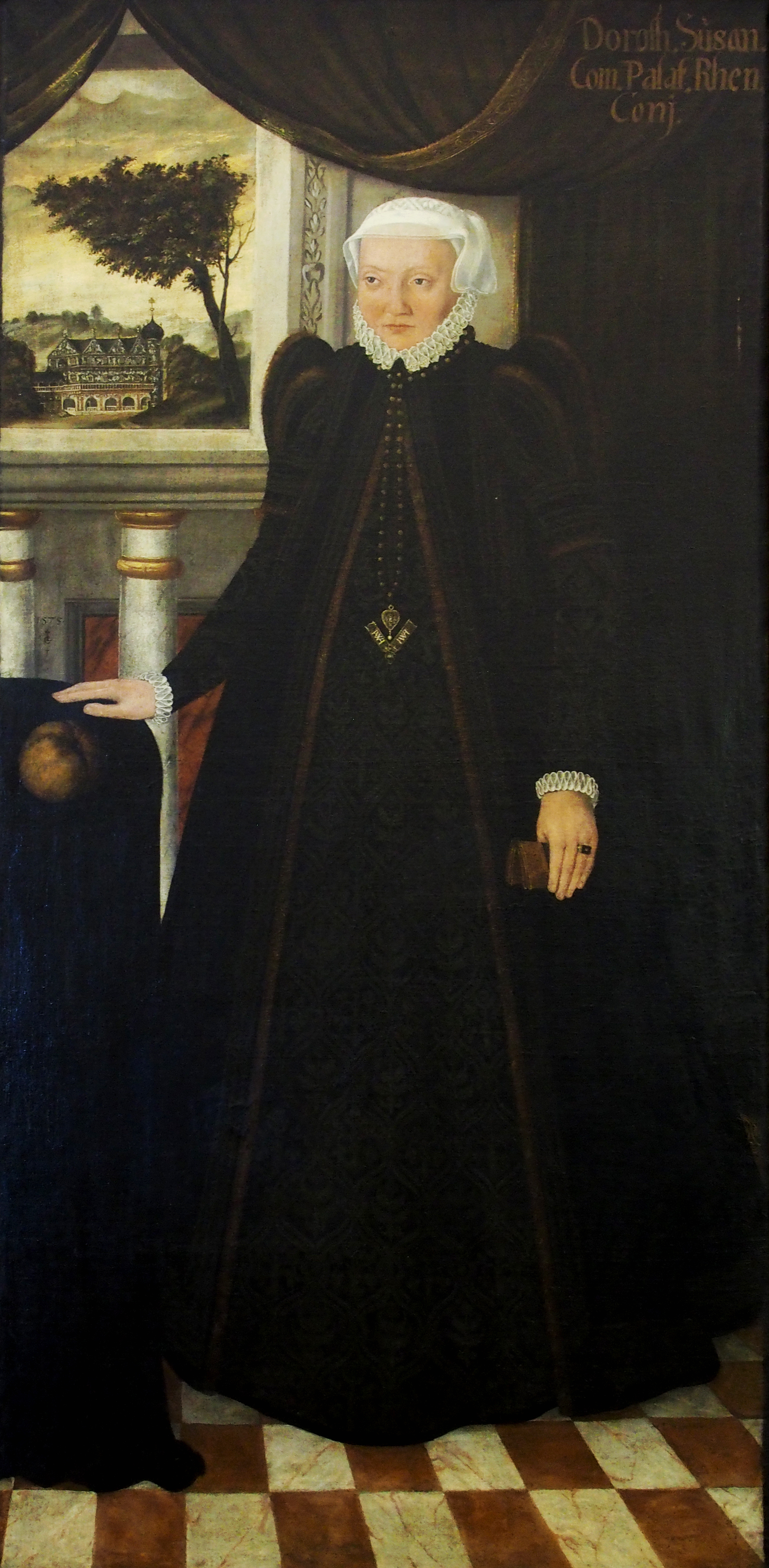
Dorothea Susanne of Simmern.

In Heidelberg on 15 June 1560 Johann Wilhelm married Dorothea Susanne of Simmern, daughter of Frederick III, Elector Palatine. They had five children:

1. Friedrich Wilhelm I, Duke of Saxe-Weimar (b. Weimar, 25 April 1562 – d. Weimar, 7 July 1602)
2. Sibylle Marie (b. Weimar, 7 November 1563 – d. Altenburg, 20 February 1569) died in childhood.
3. stillborn son (Weimar, 9 October 1564)
4. Johann II, Duke of Saxe-Weimar (b. Weimar, 22 May 1570 – d. Weimar, 18 July 1605)
5. Maria (b. Weimar, 7 October 1571 – d. Quedlinburg, 7 March 1610), Abbess of Quedlinburg (1601–1610).

== Ancestry ==
Ancestors of Johann Wilhelm, Duke of Saxe-Weimar

16. Frederick II, Elector of Saxony
8. Ernst, Elector of Saxony
17. Margarete of Austria-Styria
4. Johann, Elector of Saxony
18. Albrecht III, Duke of Bavaria
9. Elizabeth of Bavaria-Munich
19. Anna of Brunswick-Grubenhagen-Einbeck
2. Johann Frederick I, Elector of Saxony
20. Henry IV, Duke of Mecklenburg-Werle
10. Magnus II, Duke of Mecklenburg-Schwerin and Güstrow
21. Dorothea of Brandenburg
5. Sophie of Mecklenburg-Schwerin
22. Eric II, Duke of Pomerania-Wolgast
11. Sophie of Pomerania-Wolgast
23. Sophia of Pomerania-Stolp
1. Johann Wilhelm, Duke of Saxe-Weimar
24. Johann I, Duke of Cleves
12. Johann II, Duke of Cleves
25. Elizabeth of Nevers
6. Johann III, Duke of Cleves
26. Heinrich III, Landgrave of Hesse-Marburg
13. Mathilde of Hesse
27. Anna of Katzenelnbogen
3. Sibylle of Cleves
28. Gerhard VII, Duke of Jülich-Berg
14. Wilhelm IV, Duke of Jülich-Berg
29. Sophie of Saxe-Lauenburg
7. Maria of Jülich-Berg-Ravensburg
30. Albrecht III Achilles, Elector of Brandenburg
15. Sibylle of Brandenburg
31. Anna of Saxony

Regnal titles
Preceded by Johann Friedrich II	Duke of Saxony; 1566–1572	Succeeded by Himself as Duke of Saxe-Weimar; Johann Casimir as Duke of Saxe-Coburg; Johann Ernst as Duke of Saxe-Eisenach
Preceded by Himself as Duke of Saxony	Duke of Saxe-Weimar; 1572–1573	Succeeded by Friedrich Wilhelm I
