= Basilius Monner =

German jurist (1500–1566)

Basilius Monner (1500 – 16 January 1566 in Jena) was a German jurist.

== Life ==
Monner joined the Order of Saint Augustine in his youth. He enrolled at the University of Wittenburg at the height of the Reformation. In 1524, Monner became the Rector of the Gotha Gymnasium. He was active in this office for eleven years and graduated with a master's degree in the seven liberal arts in Jena. He later left Jena for the Wittenberg Academy in 1527 due to the plague.

In 1535, Monner began to study law at the Wittenberg University. He travelled to France during this time in 1538 as an envoy of the Protestants, and returned to Wittenberg on October 11, 1538, where he received his doctorate on January 16, 1539. In February 1539 he became a member of the newly-founded Wittenburg Consistory, the first of its kind. The institution was the origin of all evangelical consistories and courts of marriage.

His work in the Consistory, however, was short-lived. On October 10, 1539 he began to counsel Johann Friedrich of Saxony, and became the educator of his sons. With this, he experienced - among other things - the defeat of the electoral line of Ernestine in the Battle of Mühlberg and the Capitulation of Wittenberg. After Monner finished the training of Duke John Frederick II, Duke of Saxony on 30 September 1554, he went to the newly established Gymnasium in Jena as a professor of law in the autumn of 1554.

Here, he worked alongside Gregor Brück, the regent of Saxony. As a participant in the Colloquy of Worms (1557), he experienced the founding of the University of Jena on 15 August 1557. After taking up teaching duties on February 2, 1558, he became one of the first teachers at the faculty of law, along with Matthias Wesenbeck. Monner worked specifically in the area of the Protestant marriage law. He understood how to combine the traditional foundations of the canon law with the new requirements of the Reformation and used the two in order to formulate his beliefs.

In Jena, Monner aligned himself with the strict Lutheran faction led by Matthias Flacius.Vollert, Max (1933). "Basilius Monner, der erste Rechtslehrer an der Universität Jena". Zeitschrift des Vereins für Thüringische Geschichte und Altertumskunde (in German). Neue Folge 30: 43.

== Works ==
1. Tractatus de matrimonio et clandestinis conjugiis. Jena 1561, 1603 (Online)
2. De clandestinis conjugiis. Jena 1604
3. Quod Defensio Sit Ex Lege Naturale. Von der Defension und Gegenwehr, ob man sich wieder der Obrigkeit Tyranny und unrecht Gewalt mit … 1546, 1632
4. De matrimonio breuis et methodica explicatio. 1561
5. Orationes tres pro legibus. Frankfurt 1560
