= Anna of Saxony (1567–1613) =

Duchess of Saxe-Coburg-Eisenach from 1586 to 1593

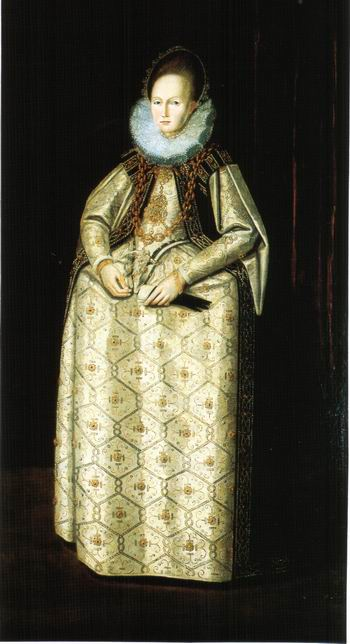

Duchess consort of Saxe-Coburg-Eisenach
- Tenure: 1586 – 1593
- Born: 16 November 1567; Dresden
- Died: 27 January 1613 (aged 45); Veste Coburg
- Spouse: John Casimir, Duke of Saxe-Coburg-Eisenach
- House: House of Wettin
- Father: Augustus, Elector of Saxony
- Mother: Anna of Denmark

Anna of Saxony (16 November 1567 – 27 January 1613), was a Duchess of Saxe-Coburg-Eisenach by marriage to John Casimir, Duke of Saxe-Coburg-Eisenach.

== Life ==
Born in Dresden, she was the twelfth of fifteen children born to Augustus, Elector of Saxony and Anne of Denmark.

On 4 May 1584, without the consent of her father, Anna became engaged to John Casimir, Duke of Saxe-Coburg-Eisenach. The marriage took place in Dresden on 16 January 1586, and she received 30,000 Thalers as a dowry, as well as the city of Römhild as her wittum. The Duchess would organize many festivities within her newly acquired court.

The marriage soon failed; John Casimir preferred hunting to marital life. By the end of September 1593, the Duchess was caught by her husband in adultery. John Casimir immediately ordered the arrest of Anna and her lover, Ulrich of Lichtenstein. Despite the letters Anna wrote to her husband and her relatives asking for leineincy, on 12 December the Schöppenstuhl (High Court Chamber) in Jena had her marriage formally annulled and sentenced both lovers to beheading by sword. Lichtenstein's sentence, however, was commuted to life imprisonment.

Anna was sent firstly to Eisenach, then to Kahlenberg Castle, in 1596 to the former Sonnefeld Monastery and finally, in 1603, to the Veste Coburg, where she died in 1613, aged 45. She was buried in the Klosterkirche, Sonnefeld. Ulrich of Lichtenstein died in prison twenty years later, on 8 December 1633, just three days after being released.

In 1599, John Casimir contracted a second marriage with Anna's maternal first-cousin, Margaret of Brunswick-Lüneburg. In order to humiliate his first wife, he celebrated this occasion with the famous Coburg Taler: the obverse showed a kissing couple with the inscription: WIE KVSSEN SICH DIE ZWEY SO FEIN (How well do the two of them kiss), while the reverse showed Anna dressed as a nun with the inscription: WER KVST MICH - ARMES NVNNELIN (Who kisses you now, poor nun).

== Notes ==
Anna of Saxony (1567–1613) House of Wettin Born: 16 November 1567 Died: 27 January 1613
German royalty
New creation	Duchess consort of Saxe-Coburg-Eisenach; 1586-1593 jointly with Elisabeth of Mansfeld-Hinterort since 1591	Succeeded by Elisabeth of Mansfeld-Hinterort
