= Saxe-Coburg-Eisenach =

European polity

Duchy of Saxe-Coburg-Eisenach Herzogtum Sachsen-Coburg-Eisenach (German)
- 1572–1596; 1633–1638
- Status: State of the Holy Roman Empire
- Capital: Coburg
- Government: Principality
- Historical era: Early modern Europe
  - Split off from S-Weimar: 1572
  - Division into S-Coburg and S-Eisenach: 1596
  - S-Coburg fell to S-Eisenach: 1633
  - Divided between S-Weimar and S-Altenburg: 1638
Preceded by	Succeeded by
Saxe-Weimar	Saxe-Altenburg; Saxe-Weimar

Saxe-Coburg-Eisenach was a duchy within the Holy Roman Empire. It existed during two fairly short periods: 1572-1596 and 1633–1638. Its territory was part of the modern states of Bavaria and Thuringia.

== History ==
The duchy was created by the Division of Erfurt in 1572 which implemented a decision of the Diet of Speyer in 1570 to separate Coburg and Eisenach from the Duchy of Saxe-Weimar and give them to John Casimir and John Ernest, the two sons of John Frederick II. However, because the two princes were still minors at the time, the country was at first ruled by Elector August of Saxony.

In 1586 the guardianship and regency ended, and John Casimir and John Ernest began to jointly to rule the duchy. John Ernest soon withdrew and returned to his hunting lodge in Marksuhl. In 1590 he formally renounced all of his participation in the government of the duchy for five years. After the end of this period, the two brothers agreed to split the country. John Casimir kept Saxe-Coburg, while John Ernest received Saxe-Eisenach.

When John Casimir died childless in 1633, John Ernest inherited his possessions and Coburg and Eisenach were combined again for a short period. When John Ernest died childless as well in 1638, the line of the Dukes of Saxe-Coburg-Eisenach ended and the country was divided between Saxe-Weimar and Saxe-Altenburg, the other two Ernestine duchies existing at that time.

Saxe-Coburg and Saxe-Eisenach would not again belong to a common state, until all Ernestine duchies merged to form Thuringia in 1920.

== Rulers ==
- John Casimir, co-Duke of Saxe-Coburg-Eisenach (1572–1596), Duke of Saxe-Coburg (1596–1633)
- John Ernest I, co-Duke of Saxe-Coburg-Eisenach (1572–1596), Duke of Saxe-Eisenach (1596–1638), of Saxe-Coburg-Eisenach (1633–1638)
