= Saxe-Eisenach =

Ernestine duchy from 1596 to 1809

Duchy of Saxe-Eisenach Herzogtum Sachsen-Eisenach (German)
- 1596–1638; 1640–1644; 1662–1809
- Saxony-Eisenach around 1680 (without the county of Sayn-Altenkirchen)

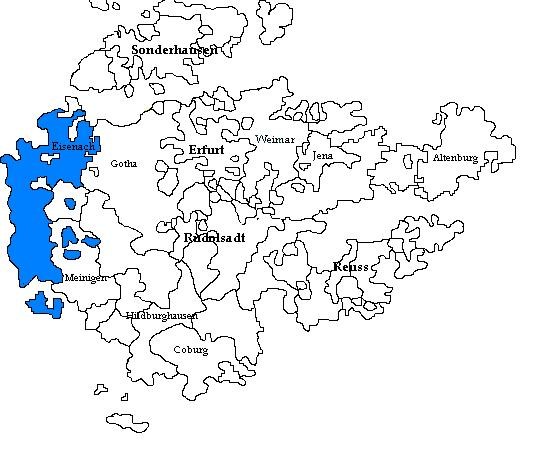
- Saxe-Eisenach from 1672, shown amongst the other 18th-century Ernestine duchies in Thuringia
- Status: State of the Holy Roman Empire (until 1806), State of the Confederation of the Rhine
- Capital: Eisenach
- Government: Principality
- Historical era: Early modern Europe
  - Division of Erfurt: 1572
  - Partitioned from S.-Coburg-Eisenach: 1596
  - Split between Saxe-Weimar and Saxe-Altenburg: 1638
  - Partitioned from Saxe-Weimar: 1640
  - Split between Saxe-Gotha and Saxe-Weimar: 1644
  - Partitioned from Saxe-Weimar: 1662
  - Merged to form S.-Weimar-Eisenach: 1809
| Preceded by | Succeeded by |
| Saxe-Coburg-Eisenach | Saxe-Weimar-Eisenach |

Saxe-Eisenach (German: Sachsen-Eisenach) was an Ernestine duchy ruled by the Saxon House of Wettin. The state intermittently existed at three different times in the Thuringian region of the Holy Roman Empire. The chief town and capital of all three duchies was Eisenach.

== History ==
In the 15th century, much of what is now the German state of Thuringia, including the area around Eisenach, was in the hands of the Wettin dynasty, since 1423 Prince-electors of Saxony. In 1485, the Wettin lands were divided according to the Treaty of Leipzig, with most of the Thuringian lands going to Elector Ernest of Saxony and his descendants. The Ernestine Wettins also retained the title of Elector. However, when Ernest's grandson John Frederick the Magnanimous revolted against Emperor Charles V during the Schmalkaldic War, he was defeated at the 1547 Battle of Mühlberg and deprived of the electorate in favour of his Wettin cousin Maurice. According to the Capitulation of Wittenberg he was only allowed to retain the lands in Thuringia.

=== Ernestine duchies ===
After John Frederick's son Duke John Frederick II in 1566 had been banned by Emperor Maximilian II due to his involvement in the Grumbach feuds, the Ernestine duchy was at first ruled by his younger brother John William. According to the 1572 Division of Erfurt, he partitioned the lands among himself and his minor nephews, the sons of John Frederick II: He himself retained the Duchy of Saxe-Weimar, while the Duchy of Saxe-Coburg-Eisenach passed to John Casimir and John Ernest, under the regency of their cousin Elector Augustus of Saxony.

For the next three centuries the Ernestine lands were divided whenever the dukes had more than one son to provide for, and re-combined when they died without direct heirs, but all of the lands stayed in the Ernestine branch of the Wettin family. All descendants of John Frederick the Magnanimous in the male line bore the title "Duke of Saxony", whether or not they actually ruled any territory. Brothers sometimes ruled jointly, but usually there was a division of territory if there was more than one son to inherit. As a result, the Duchy of Saxe-Eisenach was separated from and subsumed into other Ernestine duchies several times. The actual territories included in the duchy changed with each creation, but always with the town of Eisenach as the core.

=== Duchies of Saxe-Eisenach ===
The first Duchy of Saxe-Eisenach was created in 1596, after the banned Duke John Frederick II had died in captivity and his surviving sons had come of age. Their Duchy of Saxe-Coburg-Eisenach was split, whereby the younger John Ernest became Duke at Eisenach, while the elder John Casimir took his residence at Coburg. When in 1633 Duke John Casimir died without issue, the Wettin line in Saxe-Coburg died out, and John Ernest inherited it. Nevertheless, he himself also died heirless in 1638, and his territories were split between Saxe-Weimar and Saxe-Altenburg, which had itself been separated from Saxe-Weimar in 1603.

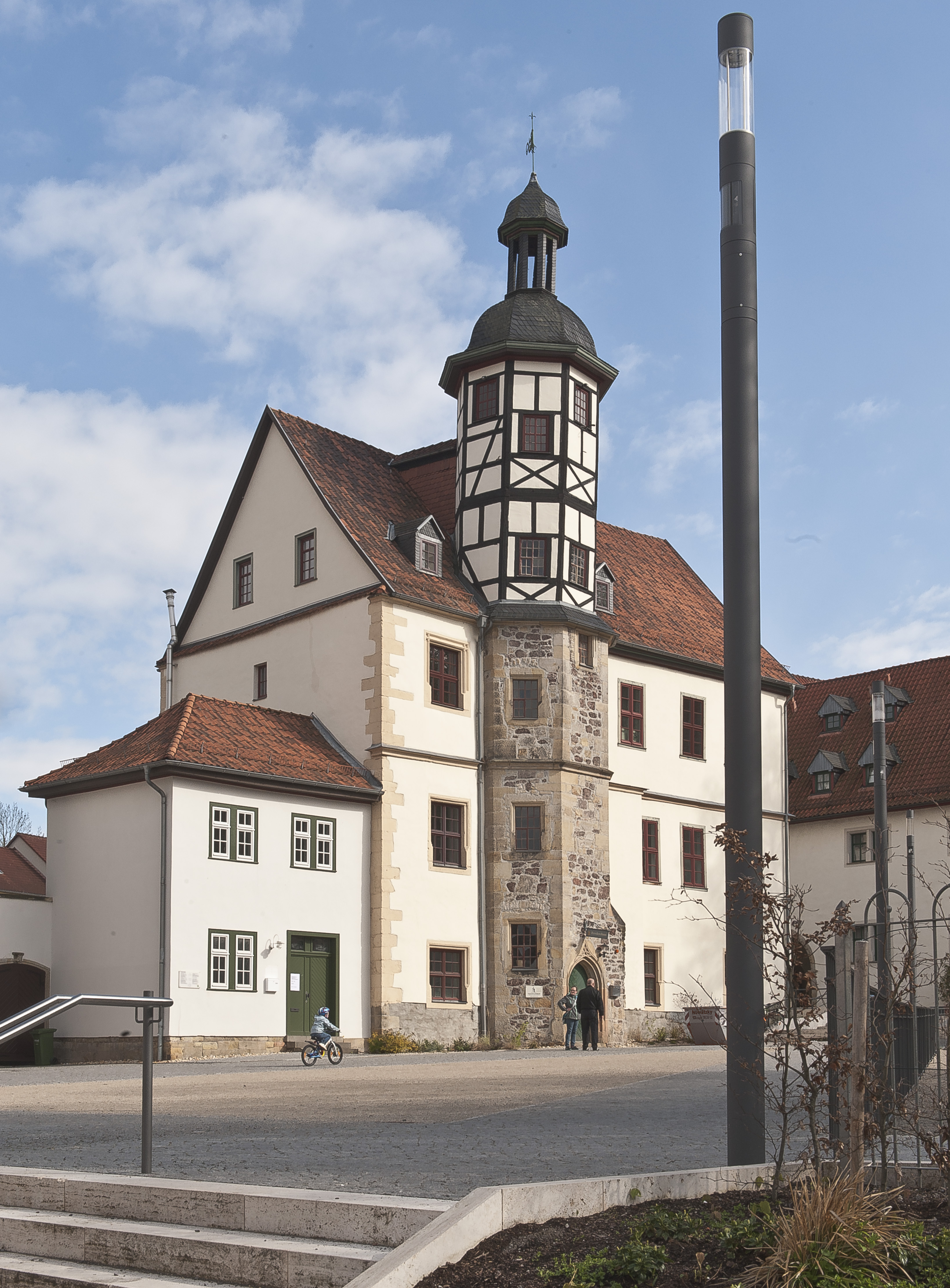
Remains of the old ducal castle

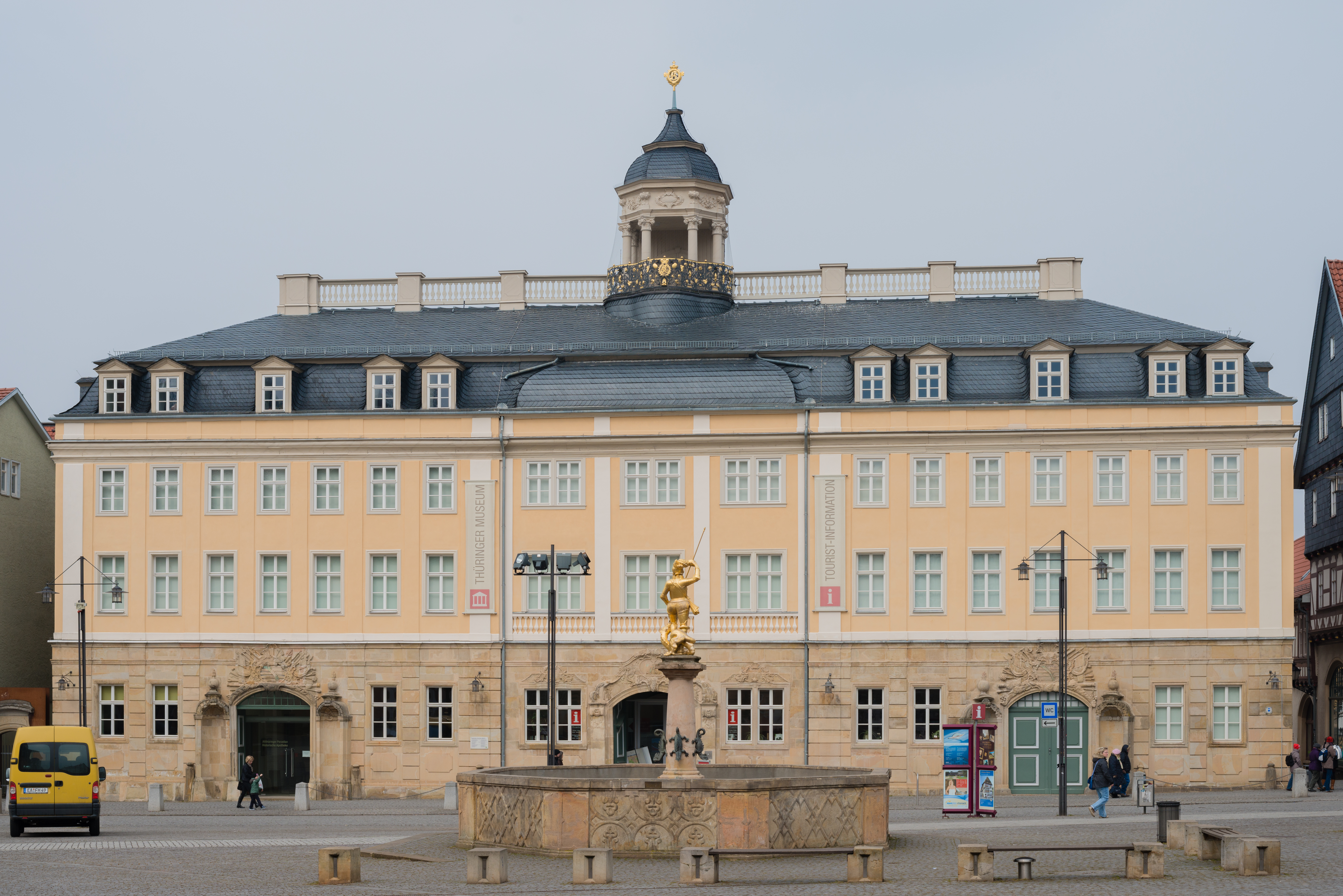
Ducal Palace of Eisenach, finished in 1748 by Ernest Augustus I, Duke of Saxe-Weimar-Eisenach

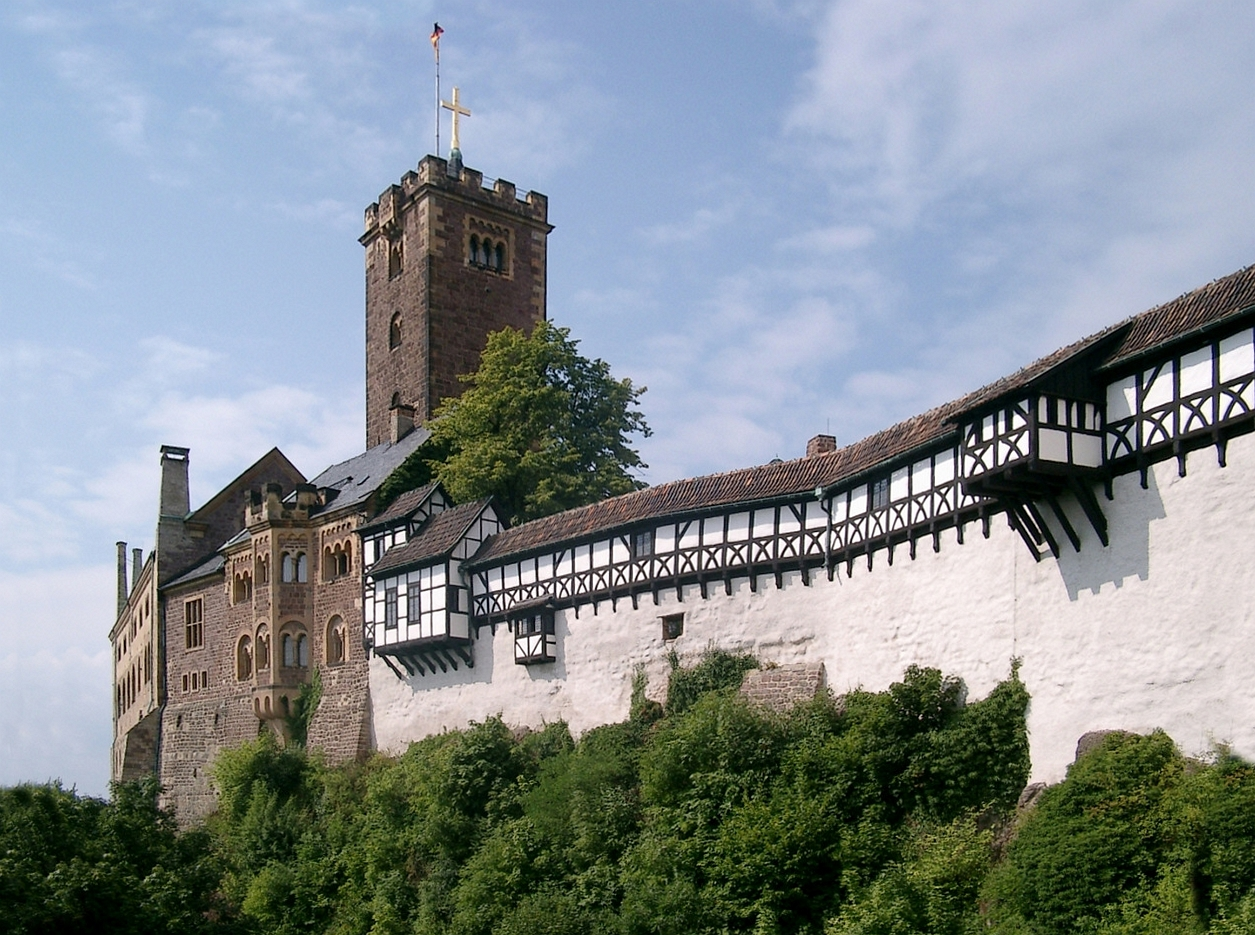
Wartburg Castle near Eisenach

In the course of the partition of the Saxe-Weimar lands among the sons of late Duke John II in 1640, the eldest brother William of Saxe-Weimar gave the re-established Duchy of Saxe-Eisenach to his younger brother Albert IV, while the youngest Ernest received the Duchy of Saxe-Gotha. However, Duke Albert died without heirs in 1644, and Saxe-Eisenach was then divided between Saxe-Gotha and Saxe-Weimar, ruled by his brothers.

For nearly 20 years the residence of Eisenach was part of Saxe-Weimar. However, when Duke Wilhelm of Saxe-Weimar died in 1662, he left four children: John Ernest, Adolf William, John George and Bernard. The second eldest, Adolf William, received Eisenach. He had to share this, however, with his younger brother John George, who finally accepted the receipt of an income from the duchy of Saxe-Eisenach and made his residence in the small town of Marksuhl. Adolf William had five sons, but the first four died soon after birth. In 1668 he died, just before of the birth of his fifth son, Willam Augustus, who became the new Duke of Saxe-Eisenach from his birth, under the guardianship of his uncle John George. A sickly boy, he died in 1671 at only two years old, and John George became Duke of Saxe-Eisenach.

Saxe-Eisenach assumed its final shape in 1672, following the death of Frederick William III of Saxe-Altenburg and the partition of his lands. The line of Johann Georg I ruled Saxe-Eisenach for 69 years, until Duke Wilhelm Heinrich died heirless in 1741. Duke Ernest Augustus I of Saxe-Weimar, Wilhelm's second cousin, inherited Saxe-Eisenach; he and his successors ruled Saxe-Weimar and Saxe-Eisenach in personal union until 1809, when the duchies were formally merged into the Duchy of Saxe-Weimar-Eisenach.

== Dukes of Saxe-Eisenach ==
=== First creation ===
Created in 1572 as Saxe-Coburg-Eisenach
1596 divided into Saxe-Coburg and Saxe-Eisenach

- John Ernest (1596–1638), left no issue

Divided between Saxe-Altenburg and Saxe-Weimar

=== Second creation ===
- Albrecht (1640–1644), left no issue

Divided between Saxe-Gotha and Saxe-Weimar

=== Third creation ===
- Adolf Wilhelm (1662–68), second son of Duke William of Saxe-Weimar
- William Augustus (1668–71), minor son, left no issue
- John George I (1671–86), third son of Duke William of Saxe-Weimar
- John George II (1686–98), son, left no issue
- John William (1698–1729), younger brother
- William Henry (1729–41), son, left no issue

Line extinct

=== Personal union with Saxe-Weimar ===
- Ernst August I (1741–1748), Duke of Saxe-Weimar since 1728
- Ernst August II (1748–1758), son
- Charles Augustus (1758–1809), son

Merged with Saxe-Weimar into Saxe-Weimar-Eisenach
