= John Ernest, Duke of Saxe-Eisenach =

John Ernest
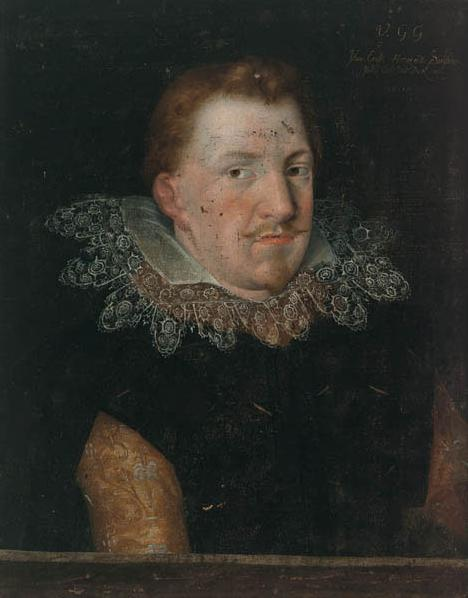
- Anonymous portrait, 1617

Duke of Saxe-Coburg-Eisenach
- Reign: 1572–1596
- Predecessor: New Creation
- Successor: Split into Saxe-Coburg and Saxe-Eisenach

Duke of Saxe-Eisenach
- Reign: 1596–1638
- Predecessor: New Creation
- Successor: Divided between Saxe-Weimar and Saxe-Altenburg

Duke of Saxe-Coburg
- Reign: 1633–1638
- Predecessor: John Casimir
- Successor: Divided between Saxe-Weimar and Saxe-Altenburg
- Born: 9 July 1566; Gotha
- Died: 23 October 1638 (aged 72); Eisenach
- Spouse: Elisabeth of Mansfeld-Hinterort; Christine of Hesse-Kassel
- Issue: John Frederick, Hereditary Prince of Saxe-Coburg-Eisenach
- House: House of Wettin
- Father: John Frederick II, Duke of Saxony
- Mother: Countess Palatine Elisabeth of Simmern-Sponheim
- Religion: Lutheran

Johann Ernst of Saxe-Eisenach (Gotha, 9 July 1566 – Eisenach, 23 October 1638), was a duke of Saxe-Eisenach and later of Saxe-Coburg.

He was the fourth (but second surviving) and youngest son of Johann Frederick II, Duke of Saxony and Countess Palatine Elisabeth of Simmern-Sponheim.

His grandfather, Johann Frederick I, had still held the title of Elector of Saxony, but after the Battle of Mühlberg he lost the title to his cousin Maurice, from the Albertine line. His father tried since then to regain the Electorate again for the Ernestine line. For this purpose he accepted an outlawed knight, Wilhelm von Grumbach, with himself, which led finally to the fact that also over his father the anger of the Emperor. Only one year after his birth was besieged the castle of his father in Gotha by troops of the Elector Augustus of Saxony and finally conquered. His father came into imperial prison from the rest of his life. His mother, Johann Ernst and his older brothers had to flee from Gotha. They found first admission with his uncle, the duke Johann Wilhelm of Saxe-Weimar, who took over also the guardianship for the princes -at the same time, he was granted by the Emperor with the lands of his brother Johann Frederick II-. After a short time in Weimar, Johann Ernst, as well as his mother and his brothers, lived in Eisenach and Eisenberg.

Later, his uncle Johann Wilhelm of Saxe-Weimar lost the Imperial favour. In the Diet of Speyer (1570), the Emperor decided to restore to the three sons of Johann Frederick II his hereditary rights. In 1572 his older brother Frederick Heinrich died from typhus fever. The same year, by the Division of Erfurt, the decision of the Diet of Speyer was made: The lands of his father were extracted again from the duchy of Saxe-Weimar, and created from them the new Duchy of Saxe-Coburg-Eisenach. Johann Ernst and his older surviving brother, Johann Casimir, were made rulers of the new country. During there minority, the lands were under the guardianship of the three Elector Princes: Frederick III of the Palatinate (also his maternal grandfather), Johann George of Brandenburg and Augustus of Saxony; also, they took the regency over Saxe-Coburg-Eisenach.

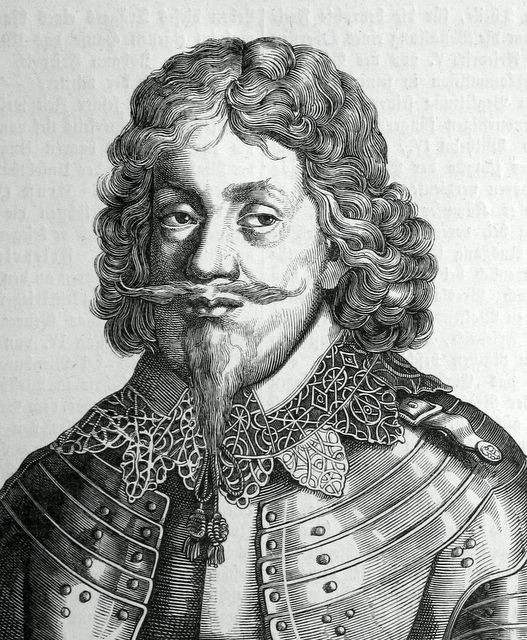
Engraving of Johann Ernst by Hugo Bürkner, 1854

The duchess Elizabeth moved to Austria, where she should live themselves in the future in the proximity of her husband, still imperial prissioner. The two young princes, Johann Casimir and Johann Ernst, moved to Coburg, the future residence of his new principality. With only six years, Johann Ernst was separated from his parents forever and entrusted to the education of strange persons. Since 1578 he visited the University of Leipzig then together with his brother. In 1586, after the wedding of his brother with Anna of Saxony, the daughter of the Elector Augustus, the guardianship finalized, and Johann Casimir began, together with his brother, the independent ruling of Saxe-Coburg-Eisenach. Johann Casimir and Johann Ernst governed together the principality for the next ten years; however, Johann Casimir carried the main responsibility for the government as an older brother. Also, in order to have a separated residence from his brother too, Johann Ernst establishes himself in the small town of Marksuhl in 1587. Since 1590 Johann Ernst withdrew himself from the government of the duchy, with his brother completely agreed it, that this should govern the duchy for five years alone, when this time had elapsed and finally agreed (in 1596) with its brother to a new divisionary treaty. The duchy of Saxe-Eisenach was taken by Johann Ernst as independent principality separated from Saxe-Coburg, who remained with Johann Casimir. Thus, Saxe-Eisenach, for the first time in his history, had his own independent political unit became within the Holy Roman Empire. During his first year of reign, Johann Ernst still live in Marsuhl because Eisenach, the new capital of his country, was inhabited and, only with the establishment of his official residence the citizens began to move there.

In 1598 Johann Ernst created for his duchy his own Landesregierung (State Government) and a Konsistorium (Consistory). In 1633 his brother, the duke Johann Casimir of Saxe-Coburg, died childless. For this, Johann Ernst inherited Saxe-Coburg, and until his own death he governed both countries in a personal union, but maintains, however, his residence in Eisenach.

In Wiener Neustadt on 23 November 1591 Johann Ernst married firstly with Elisabeth of Mansfeld-Hinterort. She died four days after giving birth to their only son:

1. John Frederick, Hereditary Prince of Saxe-Coburg-Eisenach (b. and d. Marksuhl, 8 April 1596) died at birth.

In Rotenburg on 14 May 1598 Johann Ernst married secondly with Christine of Hesse-Kassel. The marriage was happy, but remained childless.

With the death of Johann Ernst ended the older line of Saxe-Coburg-Eisenach. His principality was divided (under the rules of the Ernestine line) between Saxe-Weimar and Saxe-Altenburg.

== Ancestry ==
Ancestors of John Ernest, Duke of Saxe-Eisenach

16. Ernest, Elector of Saxony
8. John, Elector of Saxony
17. Elisabeth of Bavaria
4. John Frederick I, Elector of Saxony
18. Magnus II, Duke of Mecklenburg
9. Sophie of Mecklenburg
19. Sophie of Pomerania
2. John Frederick II, Duke of Saxony
20. John II, Duke of Cleves
10. John III, Duke of Cleves
21. Matilda of Hesse
5. Sibylle of Cleves
22. William IV, Duke of Jülich-Berg
11. Maria of Jülich-Berg
23. Sibylle of Brandenburg
1. John Ernest, Duke of Saxe-Eisenach
24. John I, Count Palatine of Simmern
12. John II, Count Palatine of Simmern
25. Joanna of Nassau-Saarbrücken
6. Frederick III, Elector Palatine
26. Christopher I, Margrave of Baden-Baden
13. Beatrice of Baden
27. Ottilie of Katzenelnbogen
3. Countess Palatine Elisabeth of Simmern-Sponheim
28. Frederick I, Margrave of Brandenburg-Ansbach
14. Casimir, Margrave of Brandenburg-Bayreuth
29. Sophia Jagiellon
7. Marie of Brandenburg-Kulmbach
30. Albert IV, Duke of Bavaria
15. Susanna of Bavaria
31. Kunigunde of Austria
