= Christine of Hesse-Kassel (1578–1658) =

- Coat-of-arms of Hesse.

Duchess consort of Saxe-Eisenach
- Tenure: 1598-1638

Duchess consort of Saxe-Coburg
- Tenure: 1633-1638
- Born: 19 October 1578; Kassel
- Died: 19 August 1658 (aged 79); Eisenach
- Spouse: John Ernest, Duke of Saxe-Eisenach
- House: House of Hesse
- Father: William IV, Landgrave of Hesse-Kassel
- Mother: Sabine of Württemberg

Christine of Hesse-Kassel (19 October 1578 – 19 August 1658) was a German noblewoman member of the House of Hesse and by marriage Duchess of Saxe-Eisenach and Saxe-Coburg.

Born in Kassel, she was the tenth of eleven children born from the marriage of William IV, Landgrave of Hesse-Kassel and his wife Duchess Sabine of Württemberg. She was probably named after both her paternal grandmother and aunt (by marriage Duchess consort of Schleswig-Holstein-Gottorp).

== Life ==
In Rotenburg an der Fulda on 14 May 1598, Christine married John Ernest, Duke of Saxe-Eisenach. On the occasion of the marriage Jacob Thysius wrote a special Epithalamium. Since her father had died in 1592, was her older brother Maurice, Landgrave of Hesse-Kassel, who took care of her trousseau. The dowry was retained until her Wittum (widow's seat) was negotiated. In the marriage contract was stipulated, in addition to her paternal, maternal and fraternal inheritance, an income from her future husband.

Christine was described as a learned and pious woman, who being married to a Lutheran prince was forced to renounce her Calvinist faith against her will. Her union was happy, but remained childless. She survived her husband by 20 years and during her long widowhood dedicated herself to pious foundations. Christine was extremely well versed in mathematics, history, astronomy, astrology and Nativitätstellerei. Because of her progressive deafness, in her last years she used an ear trumpet.

Christine died in Eisenach, aged 79. She was buried in the Georgenkirche, Eisenach; in her will, she left 6,000 guilders for the purpose of scholarship and alleviation of poverty.

== Notes ==
Christine of Hesse-Kassel (1578–1658) House of Hesse Born: 19 October 1578 Died: 19 August 1658
German royalty
| New creation | Duchess consort of Saxe-Eisenach; 1598-1638 | Duchy divided between Saxe-Weimar and Saxe-Altenburg |
| Preceded by Margaret of Brunswick-Lüneburg | Duchess consort of Saxe-Coburg; 1633-1638 | Duchy divided between Saxe-Weimar and Saxe-Altenburg |
