= Ernestine duchies =

Set of related states in Germany

Coat of arms of the Ernestines

The Ernestine duchies (German: Ernestinische Herzogtümer), also known as the Saxon duchies (Sächsische Herzogtümer, although the Albertine appanage duchies of Weissenfels, Merseburg and Zeitz were also "Saxon duchies" and adjacent to several Ernestine ones), were a group of small states whose number varied, which were largely located in the present-day German state of Thuringia and governed by dukes of the Ernestine line of the House of Wettin.

In 1800, there were seven such duchies (two held in personal unions with others) that collectively totaled 7,693 square kilometers of territory and were populated by 445,000 inhabitants.

== Overview ==
The Saxon duchy began fragmenting in the 15th century as a result of the old German succession law that divided inheritances among all sons. In addition, every son of a Saxon duke inherited the title of duke. Brothers sometimes ruled the territory inherited from their father jointly, but sometimes they split it up. Some of the Ernestine duchies retained their separate existence until 1918. Similar practices in the houses of Reuss and Schwarzburg led to all of Thuringia becoming a tangle of small states from the late 15th century until the early 20th century.

== Before the Ernestine branch ==
Count Bernhard of Anhalt, youngest son of Albert "the Bear" (1106–1170), inherited parts of the old Saxon duchy, primarily around Lauenburg and Wittenberg, in 1180. He had two sons, Albert and Henry. Albert inherited the Duchy of Saxony. In 1260 Albert bequeathed the duchy to his sons John I and Albert II, who gradually divided Saxony into the duchies of Saxe-Lauenburg and Saxe-Wittenberg with definite effect of 1296. Saxe-Wittenberg was recognized as the electorate of Saxony in the Golden Bull of 1356. When the last duke of Saxe-Wittenberg died without heir in 1422, the Emperor Sigismund gave the duchy to Frederick IV of the house of Wettin, Margrave of Meissen and Landgrave of Thuringia, who thereby became Frederick I, Elector of Saxony. The name Saxony was then generally applied to all of the Wettin's domains, including those in Thuringia, because Saxony was a ducal title, the highest they possessed, and all house members used it, although many of them held lands only in Thuringia. Frederick I was succeeded by his son, Frederick II.

After the death of Frederick II in 1464, his oldest son, Ernest, became elector, and Ernest and Duke Albert, the younger son, shared governance of the Wettin lands. In 1485, by the Leipziger division, the brothers split the Wettin possessions, with Ernest receiving northern Meissen, southern Thuringia, and Wittenberg, and Albert receiving northern Thuringia and southern Meissen.

A study of the list of members of the House of Wettin will reveal many of the different strands of the ducal house and their possessions.

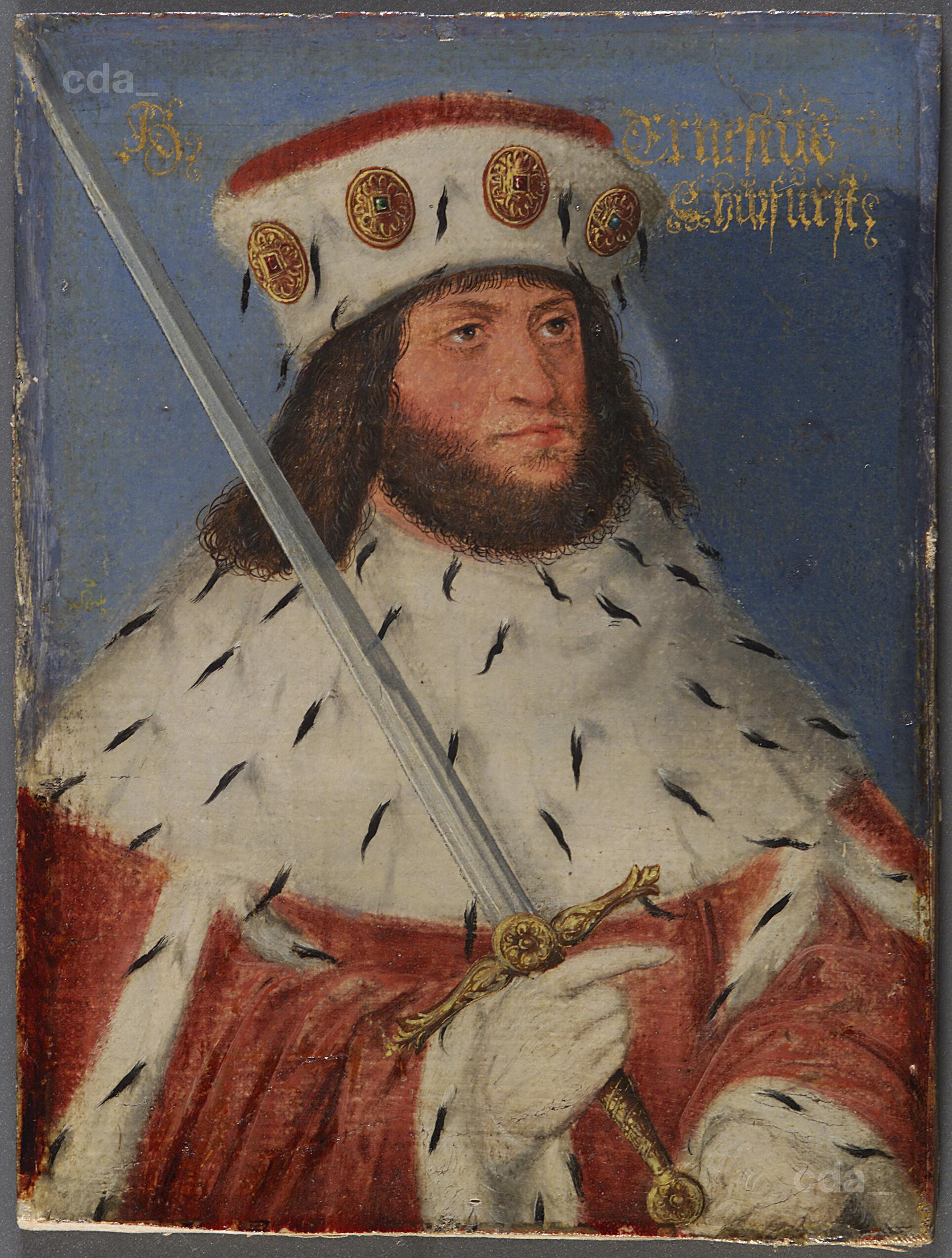
Ernest, Elector of Saxony (1441–1486)

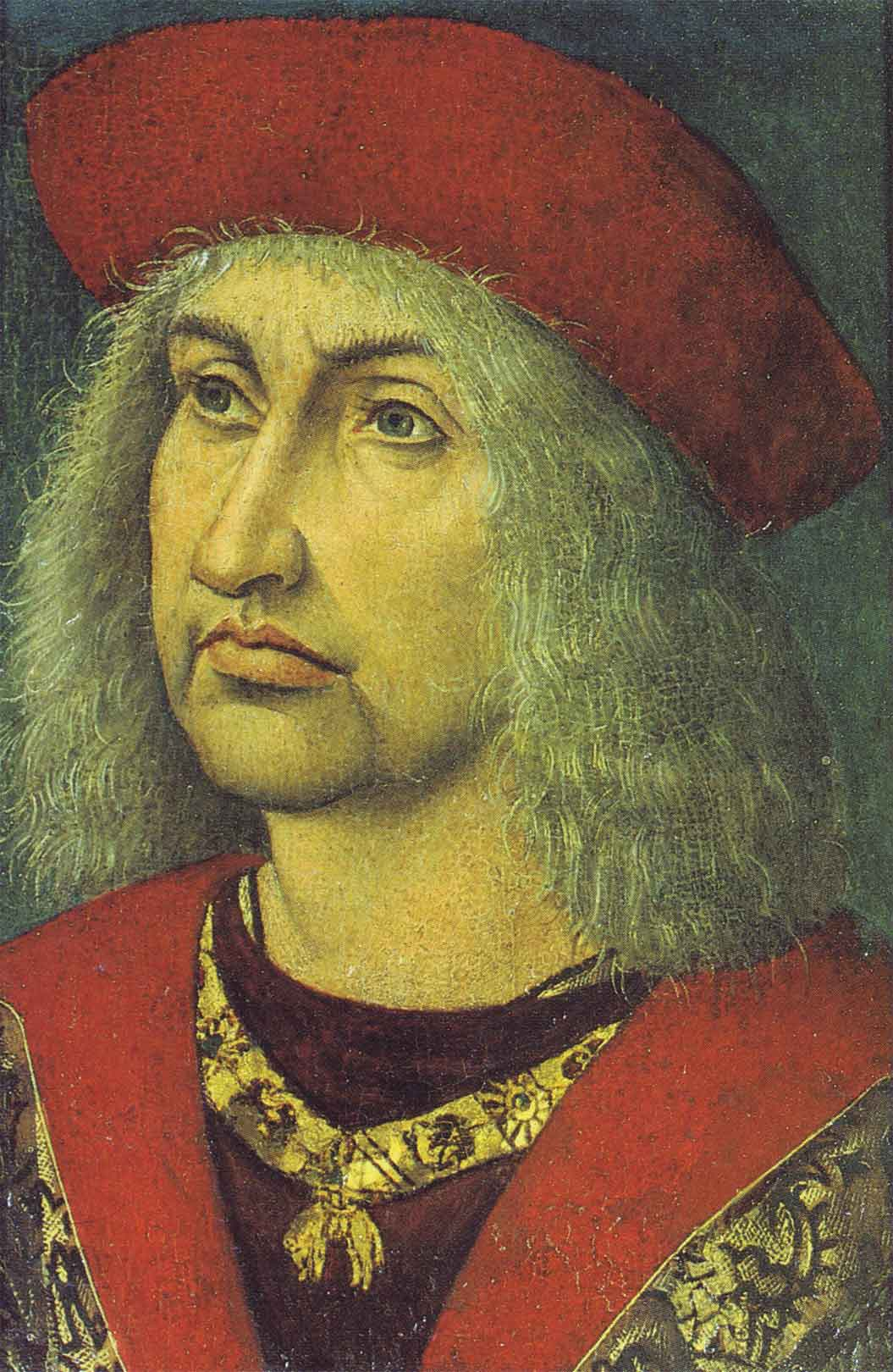
Albert, Duke of Saxony (1443–1500)

== Detailed history of divisions in the Ernestine line ==
=== Table ===
Electors of Saxony
Ernest, 1464–1486, son of Frederick II; Frederick III the Wise, 1486–1525, son of Ernest; John the Steadfast, 1525–1532, son of Ernest; Co-rulers: John Frederick I the Magnanimous, 1532–1554 (alone from 1542), son of John; John Ernest, 1532–1542, son of John; In 1554, John Frederick I split the duchy among his three sons.
Duke of Saxe-Eisenach and Saxe-Coburg		Duke of Saxe-Weimar	Duke of Saxe-Gotha
John Frederick II, 1554–1556, son of John Frederick I		John William, 1554–1573, son of John Frederick I	John Frederick III, 1554–1565, son of John Frederick I
Division of Erfurt
In 1572 the Ernestine duchies were rearranged and redivided between the two sons of John Frederick II and the son of John William.
Dukes of Saxe-Coburg-Eisenach		Dukes of Saxe-Weimar	
Co-rulers: John Casimir, 1572–1596, son of John Frederick II; John Ernest, 1572–1596, son of John Frederick II; In 1596 the brothers agreed to split the lands between them.		Frederick William, 1572–1602, son of John William; After Frederick William's death, the land was split between his young sons and his brother.	
Dukes of Saxe-Coburg	Dukes of Saxe-Eisenach		
John Casimir, 1596–1633; After the death of John Casimir without heirs, the inheritance fell to his younger brother.	John Ernest, 1596–1633	Dukes of Saxe-Altenburg	Dukes of Saxe-Weimar
John Casimir, 1596–1633; After the death of John Casimir without heirs, the inheritance fell to his younger brother.	John Ernest, 1596–1633	Co-rulers: John Philip, 1603–1639, son of Frederick William I; Frederick, 1603–1625, son of Frederick William I; John William, 1603–1632, son of Frederick William I; Frederick William II, 1603–1669 (sole ruler from 1639), son of Frederick William I; Frederick William III, 1669–1672, son of Frederick William II; After the death of Frederick William III without heirs, his principality was incorporated into Saxe-Gotha	John II, 1602–1605, son of John William; Johann Ernest I, 1605–1620, son of John II; Wilhelm, 1620–1662, son of John II; After the death of Wilhelm, the principality was divided between his four sons
Dukes of Saxe-Coburg-Eisenach		Co-rulers: John Philip, 1603–1639, son of Frederick William I; Frederick, 1603–1625, son of Frederick William I; John William, 1603–1632, son of Frederick William I; Frederick William II, 1603–1669 (sole ruler from 1639), son of Frederick William I; Frederick William III, 1669–1672, son of Frederick William II; After the death of Frederick William III without heirs, his principality was incorporated into Saxe-Gotha	John II, 1602–1605, son of John William; Johann Ernest I, 1605–1620, son of John II; Wilhelm, 1620–1662, son of John II; After the death of Wilhelm, the principality was divided between his four sons
John Ernest, 1633–1638; After the death of John Ernest without heirs, his principality was divided between Saxe-Weimar and Saxe-Altenburg. Saxe-Weimar was then big enough to be split up and the late John II:s remaining children each got a duchy.		Co-rulers: John Philip, 1603–1639, son of Frederick William I; Frederick, 1603–1625, son of Frederick William I; John William, 1603–1632, son of Frederick William I; Frederick William II, 1603–1669 (sole ruler from 1639), son of Frederick William I; Frederick William III, 1669–1672, son of Frederick William II; After the death of Frederick William III without heirs, his principality was incorporated into Saxe-Gotha	John II, 1602–1605, son of John William; Johann Ernest I, 1605–1620, son of John II; Wilhelm, 1620–1662, son of John II; After the death of Wilhelm, the principality was divided between his four sons
Dukes of Saxe-Gotha	Dukes of Saxe-Eisenach	Co-rulers: John Philip, 1603–1639, son of Frederick William I; Frederick, 1603–1625, son of Frederick William I; John William, 1603–1632, son of Frederick William I; Frederick William II, 1603–1669 (sole ruler from 1639), son of Frederick William I; Frederick William III, 1669–1672, son of Frederick William II; After the death of Frederick William III without heirs, his principality was incorporated into Saxe-Gotha	John II, 1602–1605, son of John William; Johann Ernest I, 1605–1620, son of John II; Wilhelm, 1620–1662, son of John II; After the death of Wilhelm, the principality was divided between his four sons
Ernest I, son of John II, 1640–1675	Albrecht IV, 1640–1644, son of John II; After his death without heirs, the principality was incorporated into Saxe-Weimar once again	Co-rulers: John Philip, 1603–1639, son of Frederick William I; Frederick, 1603–1625, son of Frederick William I; John William, 1603–1632, son of Frederick William I; Frederick William II, 1603–1669 (sole ruler from 1639), son of Frederick William I; Frederick William III, 1669–1672, son of Frederick William II; After the death of Frederick William III without heirs, his principality was incorporated into Saxe-Gotha	John II, 1602–1605, son of John William; Johann Ernest I, 1605–1620, son of John II; Wilhelm, 1620–1662, son of John II; After the death of Wilhelm, the principality was divided between his four sons

=== History ===
Elector Ernest died in 1486, and was succeeded by his son, Frederick the Wise. Leipzig, the economic center of Saxony, as well as the seat of the only university in Saxony, was located in Albertine Saxony. Wanting a university in his lands, for example, to educate civil servants and pastors, Frederick founded the University of Wittenberg in 1502. It was there that Martin Luther posted his 95 Theses. Frederick protected Luther, refusing to extradite him to Rome for trial. Frederick, like other German princes, allowed Lutheran reforms to be implemented in his domain.

Frederick III died in 1525; he was succeeded by his brother, John the Steadfast (1525–1532). John was a leader in the Schmalkaldic League of Protestant princes in the Holy Roman Empire. John died in 1532 and was succeeded by his son John Frederick I. For the first ten years of his reign, John Frederick shared the rule of Ernestine Saxony with his stepbrother, John Ernest, titularly Duke of Saxe-Coburg, who died childless. John Frederick increasingly hardened his support of the Lutheran Reformation, while the Emperor, Charles V, avoided direct confrontation with the Protestant princes, as he needed their support in his struggle with France.

Charles eventually came to terms with France, and turned his attention to the Protestant lands of the Holy Roman Empire. In 1546 the Schmalkaldic League raised an army. Elector John Frederick led the league's troops south, but shortly thereafter John Frederick's cousin, Duke Maurice of Albertine Saxony (Meissen), invaded Ernestine Saxony. John Frederick hurried back to Saxony, expelled Maurice from the Ernestine lands, conquered Albertine Saxony and proceeded to invade Bohemia (held directly by Emperor Charles V's brother Ferdinand and that latter's wife Anna of Bohemia and Hungary). Charles' forces drove the Schmalkaldic League troops back and decisively defeated them in the Battle of Mühlberg (1547). John Frederick was wounded and taken prisoner. The Emperor condemned him to death as a rebel, but stayed the execution because he did not want to take the time to capture Wittenberg, defended by John Frederick's wife Sybille of Cleves. To save his life, John Frederick conceded in the Capitulation of Wittenberg to resign the Electorate and the government of his country in favor of Maurice of the Albertine Saxony, and his punishment was changed into imprisonment for life. When the newly minted Elector Maurice, having again changed sides, attacked the Emperor, Duke John Frederick was released from prison, and given back the Landgraviate of Thuringia. He established his capital in Weimar, and started a university at Jena (to replace the one in Wittenberg lost to Maurice) before his death in 1554.

The three sons of John Frederick I shared the territory, with John Frederick II becoming head (and briefly, 1554–1556, holding the electoral title) with his seats in Eisenach and Coburg, the middle brother John William staying in Weimar (Saxe-Weimar), and the youngest, John Frederick III (namesake of the eldest brother, which has caused much confusion in history writing) establishing residence in Gotha (Saxe-Gotha). When John Frederick III of Gotha died unmarried and heirless in 1565, John William of Weimar tried to claim succession to Saxe-Gotha, but the sons of the imprisoned John Frederick II entered their own claim.

The contenders reached agreement in 1572 in the Division of Erfurt by which John William added the districts of Altenburg, Gotha and Meiningen to Saxe-Weimar. When John William died a year later, his older son, Frederick William I received Altenburg, Gotha and Meiningen with the title of Duke of Saxe-Altenburg, and with his several sons founding the first Saxe-Altenburg line, while Saxe-Weimar went to the younger son John II. John Casimir (died heirless 1633), the older son of John Frederick II, and John Ernest (died heirless 1638), the younger son of John Frederick II, received together the territory of Saxe-Coburg-Eisenach, but were appointed a legal guardian because they were minors. In 1596 the brothers agreed to split the duchy into Saxe-Coburg and Saxe-Eisenach.

Johann II, Duke of Saxe-Weimar (or John II), died young leaving eight surviving sons (including Bernhard of Saxe-Weimar, the youngest, the famed general) and a will ordering them to rule jointly. When the eldest of them, John Ernest I, Duke of Saxe-Weimar died in action (1626) unmarried, two more of his brothers were already deceased without children, leaving five dukes of Saxe-Weimar, with Wilhelm the eldest. Two more died within fifteen years, including Bernhard in 1639, without heirs. In 1638, the senior Coburg-Eisenach line became extinct and its possessions were divided between the Altenburgs and the Weimars, this doubled the Saxe-Weimar possessions and made it again feasible to be divided. In c. 1640, the remaining brothers finally divided their patrimony, William remaining in Weimar, Albert (Albrecht) receiving seat as Duke of Eisenach and Ernest (by-named "the Pious") also got his share and became known as Duke of Gotha.

Ernest I, Duke of Saxe-Gotha (1601–1675) had married Elisabeth Sophie, the only child of Johann Philipp, Duke of Saxe-Altenburg and Gotha (1597–1638), the eldest son of Frederick William I. When Elisabeth Sophie's cousin Frederick William III, Duke of Altenburg, died unmarried 1672, the entire first Altenburg line became extinct in male line, opening a succession strife. Ultimately, Ernest and Elisabeth Sophie's sons received the lion's share of Altenburg inheritance, on basis of Duke John Philip's testament (as it was ultimately recognized that the Salic law does not prevent an agnate to will all his possessions to those other agnates of the house he desires to make his heirs, leaving other agnates without; and if those favored agnates also happened to be the testator's son-in-law and maternal grandsons, that is in no way prohibited), but a portion (one-fourth of the original Altenburg moiety) passed to the Saxe-Weimar branch. These two lines: Weimar and Gotha(-Altenburg) form the basis of future Ernestine lines, and both have surviving male lineage up to today. After the division of the inheritance of the first Altenburg line, the senior, Weimar, line held somewhat less than half of the Ernestine lands, and the junior, Gotha-Altenburg, line held more than half. Gotha-Altenburg line subdivided more and Weimar line not so much, and ultimately all the said Weimar line's possessions were concentrated in primogenitural hands in 1741 and in 1815 were raised to grand ducal title of Weimar.

Duke Ernest of Gotha and Duchess Elisabeth Sophie's numerous sons divided the inheritance (five-eighths of all Ernestine lands) initially to seven parts: Gotha-Altenburg, Coburg, Meiningen, Römhild, Eisenberg, Hildburghausen and Saalfeld. Of them, Coburg, Römhild and Eisenberg did not survive past that one generation and were apportioned between the four persevering lines.

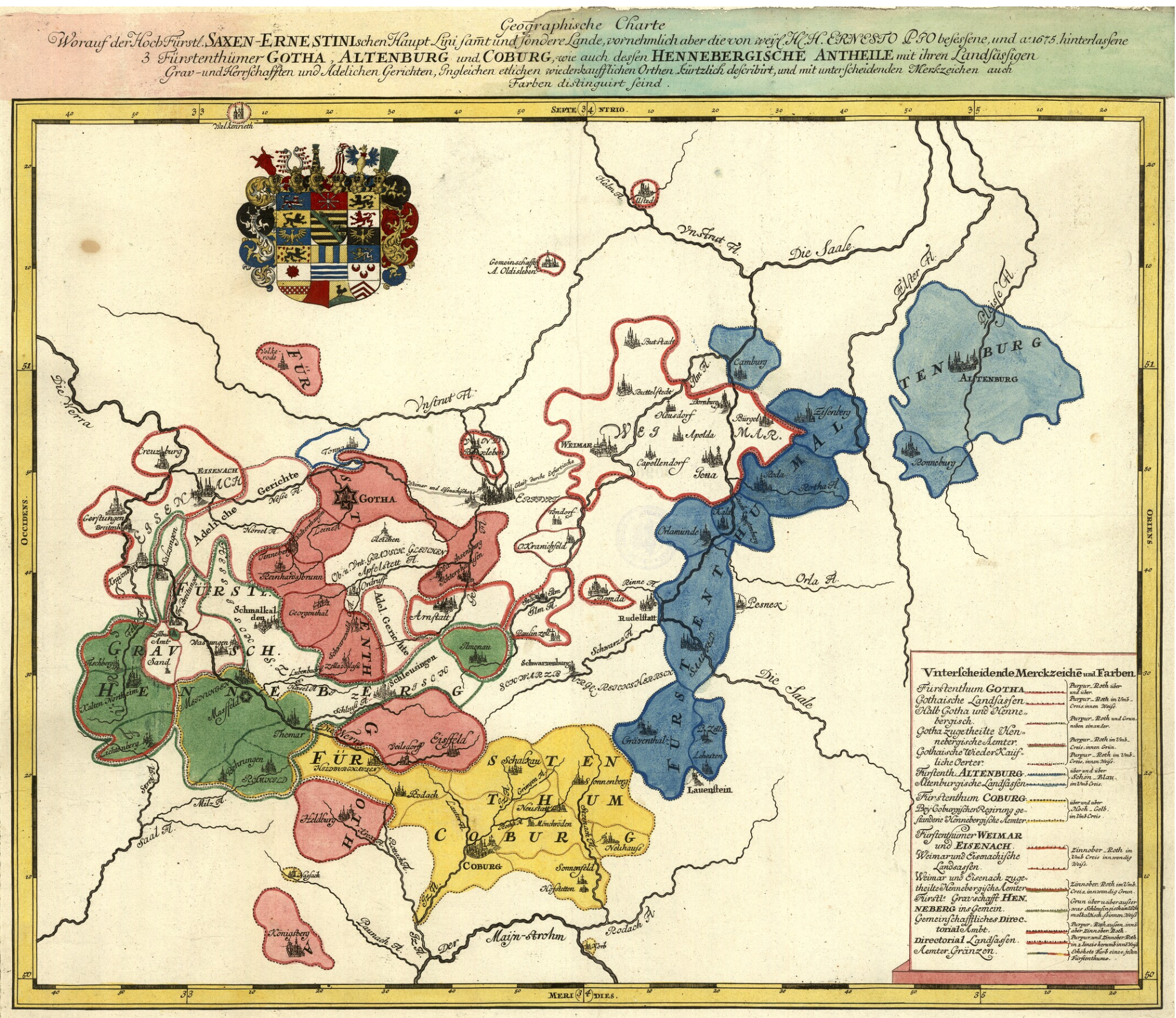
Mid-18th century map of the Ernestine duchies

The Ernestine territories in Thuringia were thus divided and recombined many times as Dukes left more than one son to inherit, and as various lines of the Ducal Ernestines died out in male line. Eventually, primogeniture became the rule for inheritance in the Ernestine duchies, but not before the number of Ernestine duchies had risen to ten at one point. By 1826 the remaining Ernestine duchies were the Grand Duchy of Saxe-Weimar-Eisenach (approximately three-eighths of all the Ernestine lands), and the ("Elisabeth-Sophie-line") duchies of Saxe-Gotha-Altenburg, Saxe-Meiningen, Saxe-Hildburghausen and Saxe-Coburg-Saalfeld. In 1826, Ernest the Pious' senior line of Gotha-Altenburg became extinct. The daughter of its penultimate duke had been married with the Duke of Coburg and Saalfeld, and the couple had two sons – the younger of whom was to become Albert, Prince Consort of the United Kingdom. The patrimony of Gotha-Altenburg was divided between the other three lines stemming from Ernest the Pious and Elisabeth Sophie, causing changes in nomenclature: onwards, they were Saxe-Meiningen-Hildburghausen, Saxe-Altenburg (the former Hildburghausen line) and Saxe-Coburg and Gotha – the youngest line (originally Saalfeld line) receiving the "maternal" seat of Gotha which had been the seat of Ernest the Pious, progenitor of all these seven lines. All of the Ernestine duchies ended with the abolition of the monarchy and princely states in Germany shortly after the end of World War I.

Five of the Ernestine duchies were members of the Upper Saxon Circle of the Holy Roman Empire:

- Saxe-Weimar
- Saxe-Eisenach
- Saxe-Coburg
- Saxe-Gotha
- Saxe-Altenburg

Membership in the Circle gave the ruler of a state a vote in the Imperial Diet. In the 1792 session of the Imperial Diet, the Duke of Saxe-Weimar was also the Duke of Saxe-Eisenach, and had two votes (as well as three-eights of all the Ernestine lands); the Duke of Saxe-Altenburg was also the Duke of Saxe-Gotha (as senior heir of both Duke John Philip and Duke Ernest the Pious), and had two votes; and the Duke of Saxe-Coburg had one vote.

The other Ernestine duchies were never members of the Imperial Circle, and did not have the right to vote in the Imperial Diet as the five duchies that the other duchies did (for example, the principalities of Meiningen and Hildburghausen were such; that was one reason why Duke of Saxe-Hildburghausen exchanged his patrimony to that of Altenburg). However they were all autonomous and ultimately, with the dissolution of the Holy Roman Empire on 6 August 1806, that issue became irrelevant.

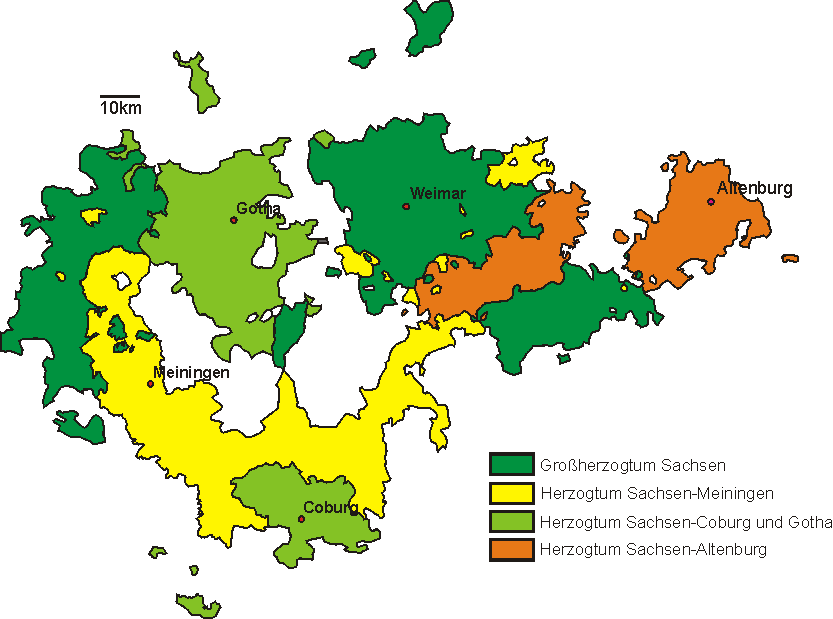
The Ernestine Duchies in Thuringia after 1825

- Saxe-Altenburg (1603 to 1672; 1826 to 1918; extinct in 1991)
- Saxe-Coburg (1596 to 1633; 1681 to 1699)
- Saxe-Coburg-Eisenach (1572 to 1596)
- Saxe-Coburg-Saalfeld (1735 to 1826)
- Saxe-Eisenberg (1680 to 1707)
- Saxe-Coburg-Gotha (1826 to 1918)
- Saxe-Eisenach (1596 to 1638; 1640 to 1644; 1672 to 1809)
- Saxe-Gotha (1640 to 1680)
- Saxe-Gotha-Altenburg (1681 to 1826)
- Saxe-Hildburghausen (1680 to 1826)
- Saxe-Jena (1672 to 1690)
- Saxe-Marksuhl (1662 to 1672)
- Saxe-Meiningen (1681 to 1918)
- Saxe-Römhild (1680 to 1710)
- Saxe-Saalfeld (1680 to 1735)
- Saxe-Weimar (1572 to 1809)
- Saxe-Weimar-Eisenach (1809 to 1918)

== Ernestine Duchies since 1918 ==
Saxe-Weimar-Eisenach, Saxe-Coburg-Gotha, Saxe-Meiningen and Saxe-Altenburg were the only remaining duchies at the time of the German Revolution of 1918. (Weimar-Eisenach was the result of the merger of the personal union of Weimar and Eisenach into one title in 1809. It was raised to a Grand Duchy in 1815 and officially renamed the Grand Duchy of Saxony in 1903.) The rulers' legal privileges and status as Dukes were abolished under the new republican regime. The four duchies became five of the constituent states of the Weimar Republic when Gotha and Coburg split. The Free State of Coburg became part of the Free State of Bavaria on 1 July 1920. The other four states plus Schwarzburg-Rudolstadt, Schwarzburg-Sondershausen and the People's State of Reuss merged on 1 May 1920 to form the State of Thuringia.

This reorganisation has remained to the present day, although it was de facto nonexistent during Nazi Rule, when the Reichsgau system was used instead and Gau Thuringia administered the Free State and Gau Bayreuth administered northern Bavaria. Between 1945 and 1990 Thuringia was in the Soviet Occupation zone and then East Germany while Bavaria was in the American Occupation zone and then West Germany.

=== Surviving claimants ===
On 13 February 1991 Georg Moritz, Hereditary Prince of Saxe-Altenburg died and with him the line of Ernest, Duke of Saxe-Hildburghausen and Saxe-Altenburg went extinct. His claim passed to Michael, Prince of Saxe-Weimar-Eisenach (b. 15 November 1946). This line is also likely to go extinct soon as Michael only has a daughter and the only other male is his cousin Prince Wilhelm Ernst (b. 10 August 1946), whose son died childless in 2018. These two represent the last non-morganatic descendants of William, Duke of Saxe-Weimar. The remaining four males in this line are the Barons of Heygendorff. The situation is even worse for Konrad, Prince of Saxe-Meiningen (b. 14 April 1952), who is the sole non-morganatic male member of the Saxe-Meiningens and unmarried. His nephew and grandnephew are morganatic as are the Barons von Saalfeld. They are the only remaining descendants of Bernhard I, Duke of Saxe-Meiningen.

In the very likely event of the extinction of these two senior branches, the sole representation of the Ernestine Wettins will pass to the descendants of Francis, Duke of Saxe-Coburg-Saalfeld, who are the present Saxe-Coburg-Gothas led by Hubertus, Prince of Saxe-Coburg and Gotha (b. 16 September 1975), the House of Windsor, the Royal Family of Belgium and the Royal Family of Bulgaria. Francis and his nephew Ludwig Frederick Emil von Coburg are also ancestors to morganatic lines.

After Prince Hubertus, his son and his younger brother, the line of succession is usually presumed to then go to the former Tsar Simeon II of Bulgaria (b. 16 June 1937), who has three sons and seven grandsons, but his marriage to a daughter of a Marquess is possibly morganatic.

When it became clear that Ernest II, Duke of Saxe-Coburg and Gotha would die childless, Edward VII renounced his rights to Saxe-Coburg and Gotha (but only to that duchy) to avert an undesirable personal union. The House of Windsor (whose original male line includes only the descendants of Edward's son George V since 26 April 1943) and the Royal Family of Belgium renounced their German titles in 1917 and 1920 respectively. Although whether this actually removed them from all Ernestine successions has been debated. All the surviving agnatic lines however include marriages that are (at least highly likely) morganatic.

== See also ==
- History of Saxony
- Thuringia
- Division of Erfurt in 1572 (in German)
