= Margaret of Brunswick-Lüneburg =

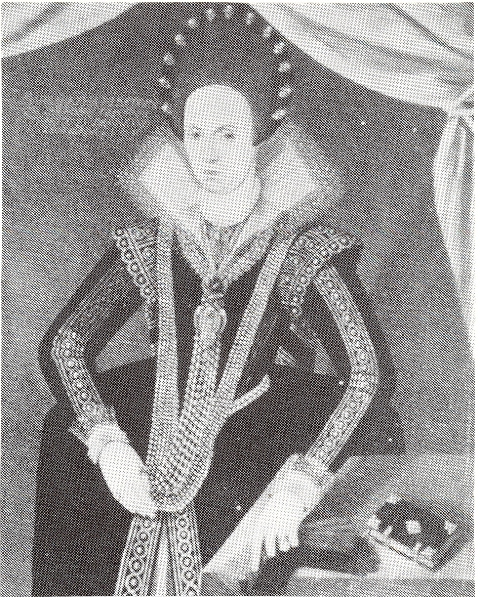

Duchess consort of Saxe-Coburg
- Tenure: 1599-1633
- Born: 6 April 1573; Celle
- Died: 7 August 1643 (aged 70); Celle
- Spouse: John Casimir, Duke of Saxe-Coburg
- House: Welf
- Father: William the Younger, Duke of Brunswick-Lüneburg
- Mother: Dorothea of Denmark

Margaret of Brunswick-Lüneburg (6 April 1573 – 7 August 1643), was a German member of the House of Welf and the Duchess of Saxe-Coburg by marriage.

Born in Celle, she was the ninth of fifteen children born from the marriage of William the Younger, Duke of Brunswick-Lüneburg and Dorothea, Princess of Denmark.

== Life ==
Margaret married John Casamir, Duke of Saxe-Coburg in Coburg on 16 September 1599, becoming his second wife.

Most of the wedding guests stayed before and during the marriage festivities at Heldburg Castle. Gilded state coaches, which were originally part of her mother's dowry, were used for the occasion; they are one of the oldest still functioning coaches in the world and currently displayed at the Veste Coburg.

John Casimir celebrated his marriage with the famous Coburg Taler: on the obverse showed a kissing couple with the inscription WIE KVSSEN SICH DIE ZWEY SO FEIN (A well kiss between two), while on the reverse, showed a nun with the inscription: WER KVST MICH - ARMES NVNNELIN (who kiss you now, poor nun?). This nun was Anna of Saxony, his first wife, whom he repudiated and imprisoned for adultery.

John Casimir and Margaret had a happy marriage, but they had no children. After John Casimir's death in 1633 Saxe-Coburg was inherited by his brother John Ernest. Margaret returned to her homeland, Celle, where she died ten years later, aged 70. She was buried in the Stadtkirche, Celle.

== Notes ==
Margaret of Brunswick-Lüneburg House of Wettin Born: 16 November 1567 Died: 27 January 1613
German royalty
New creation	Duchess consort of Saxe-Coburg; 1599-1633	Succeeded by Christine of Hesse-Kassel
