= Diet of Speyer (1570) =

1570 Imperial Diet of the Holy Roman Empire in the Imperial City of Speyer

The Diet of Speyer or the Diet of Spires (sometimes referred to as Speyer V) was an Imperial Diet of the Holy Roman Empire which took place in 1570 in the Imperial City of Speyer (also known as Spires, in present-day Germany).

== Diet ==
The Diet decided to allow printing only in free imperial cities, residences, and university towns. This was a measure to exert tighter control (censorship) in the struggle against the spread of the Protestant Reformation.

The Diet also decided to return part of the land confiscated from Elector John Frederick II of Saxony to his children John Casimir (who received the Coburg area) and John Ernest (who received the Eisenach area).

The Diet also agreed to the Treaty of Speyer (1570) in which King John II Sigismund Zápolya abdicated as King of Hungary in favor of Emperor Maximilian II. John became Prince of Transylvania. The verdict of the Diet was also necessary for the adoption of the Augsburg Imperial Coin Edict of 1566.
