= Morizkirche (Coburg) =

St. Moriz
- Stadtkirche St. Moriz
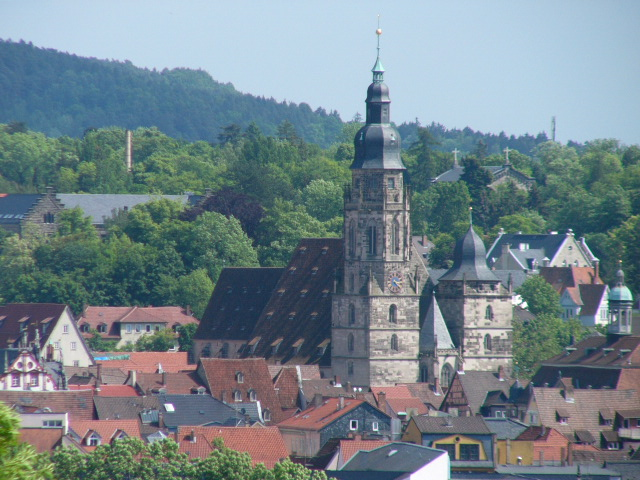
- St Moriz (2009)

- Location within Bavaria Location within Germany
- 50°15′26″N 10°57′58″E
- Country: Germany
- Denomination: Protestant

Architecture
- Heritage designation: Listed monument
- Architectural type: hall church
- Style: Gothic/Baroque
- Groundbreaking: 1310
- Completed: 16th century

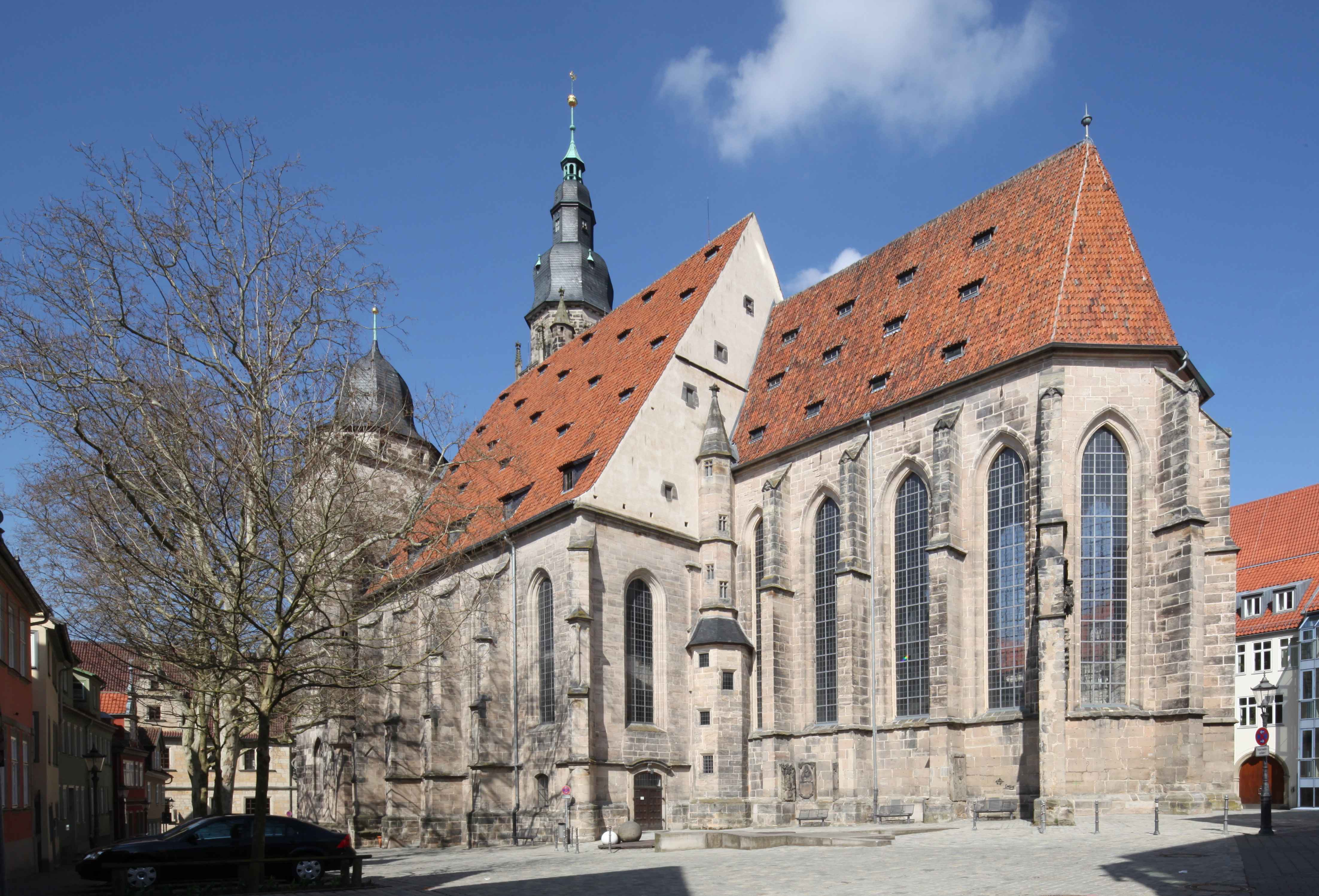
Eastern Gothic choir

Morizkirche (or Stadtkirche St. Moriz) is a Protestant church dedicated to Saint Maurice in Coburg, Bavaria, Germany, and is the town's oldest church. Its earliest remaining structures date back to the 14th century, which superseded a church from the 12th century. Martin Luther is known to have given several sermons there in 1530 A.D. This church currently houses the family tomb of the Dukes of Coburg. In modern times, Morizkirche serves as the main church for the congregation of St. Moriz. Due to the height of its towers, the church is one of the landmarks of Coburg. It is also one of the most important Luther memorial sites in southern Germany.

== History ==
An earlier Romanesque basilica from the 12th century stood in the place of the current church as part of an ensemble of ecclesial buildings, including a graveyard and administrative structures. This was a Probstei of the Benedictinians of Saalfeld Abbey. The existing St. Moriz church dates from the 14th century, which makes it Coburg's oldest existing church. Construction began around 1310. The earliest surviving section is the eastern choir, completed in 1330. In the 15th century, the west portal with its two towers was demolished and replaced by the current structure with its two dissimilar towers.

Reformation came early to Coburg, with Balthasar Düring preaching there in 1518. With Reformation, ownership of the church passed to the town, who took on the cost of operation. During the Easter week of 1530, Martin Luther gave several sermons at the Morizkirche.

In the late 17th century, Kaspar Friedrich Nachtenhöfer, a writer of hymns, was parson and deacon at St Moriz.

The interior of the late Gothic hall church was refurbished in Baroque style in the middle of the 18th century. Thus most of what is visible of the interior today dates from the 1740-2 renovation. Architect Johann David Steingruber created the current structure with two galleries. In this refurbishment, much of the Gothic interior was destroyed or changed substantially. Most of the rich medieval features, such as 15 altars and valuable figures, had already been lost during the Reformation, however.

The church served as the burial place of the Ducal family until it became too small and a new mausoleum on the Friedhof am Glockenberg was constructed in the 1850s, with financial support from the Royal houses of Belgium and the United Kingdom.

On 20 October 1932, Prince Gustaf Adolf of Sweden and Princess Sibylla of Saxe-Coburg and Gotha, the parents of King Carl XVI Gustaf of Sweden, were married at St. Moriz.

On 7 July 2018, Princess Stephanie of Saxe-Coburg and Gotha, only daughter of Andreas, Prince of Saxe-Coburg and Gotha married at St. Moritz to Jan Stahl, an engineer with BMW.

== Architecture and art ==
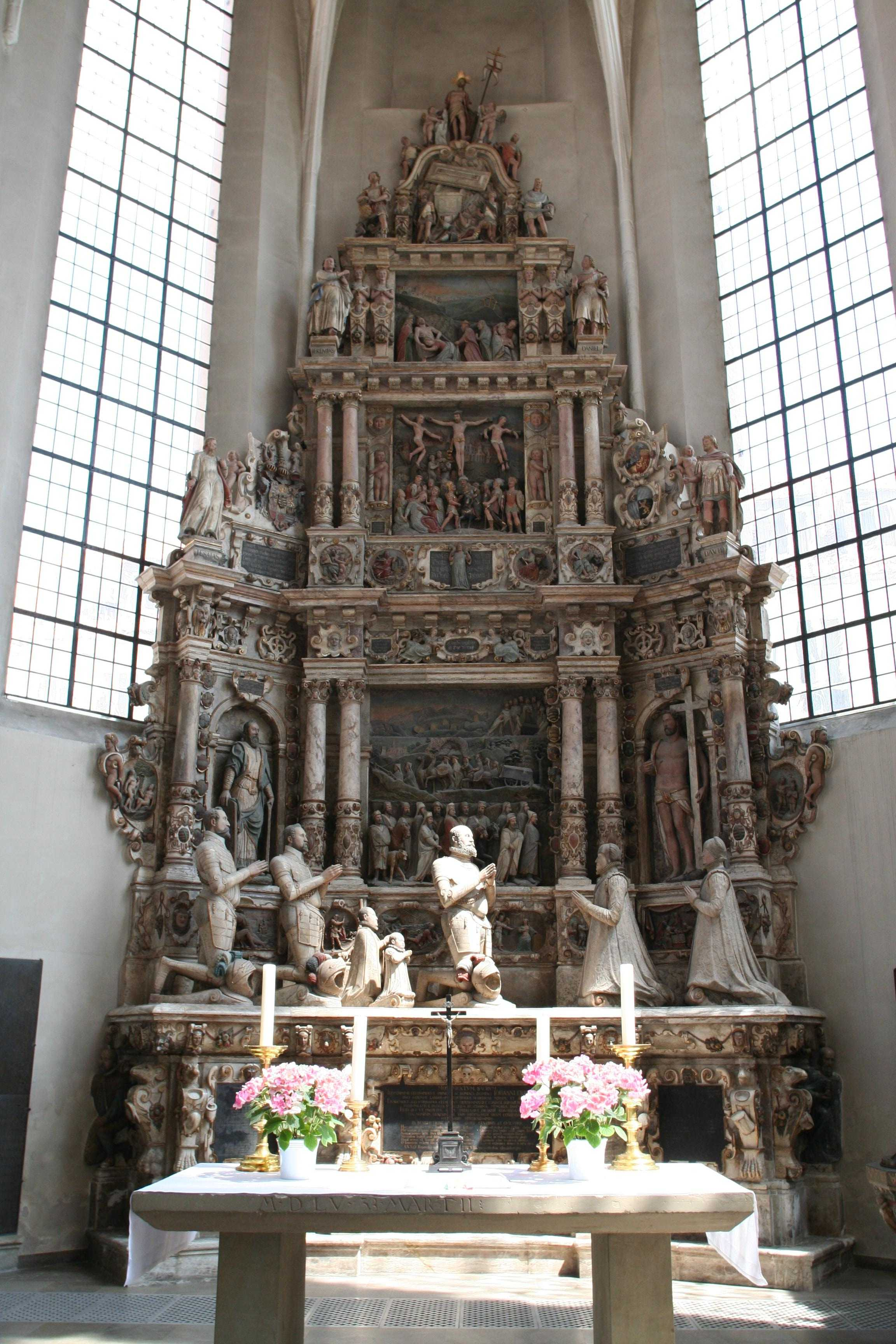
Renaissance epitaph for Duke Johann Friedrich II

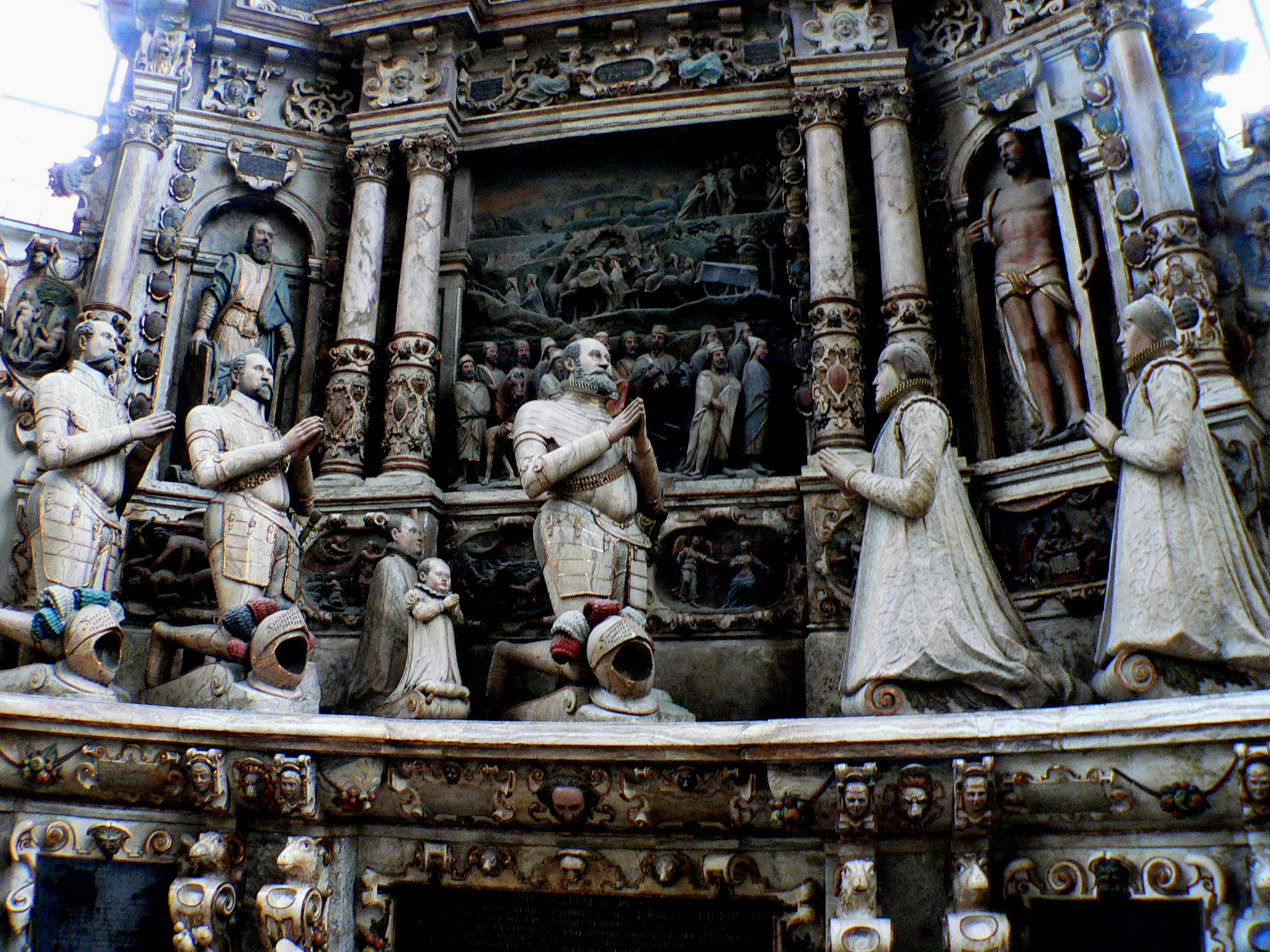
Detail of the epitaph showing the Ducal family

The church contains the tomb of the Ducal family. It is dominated by the 13 m (47 ft) high Renaissance alabaster epitaph for Duke Johann Friedrich II, by sculptor Nikolaus Bergner (finished in 1598).

== Organ ==
The organ by the Karl Schuke Berliner Orgelbauwerkstatt was installed in 1989 into a reconstructed frame originally built by Wolfgang Heinrich Daum (1740).

== Today ==
The church is owned by the town of Coburg, but serves as main church of the Protestant congregation of St. Moriz.

As of early 2016, the church is closed for renovation.

Church open for visitors in December 2023.
