= John Frederick II of Saxony =

John Frederick II
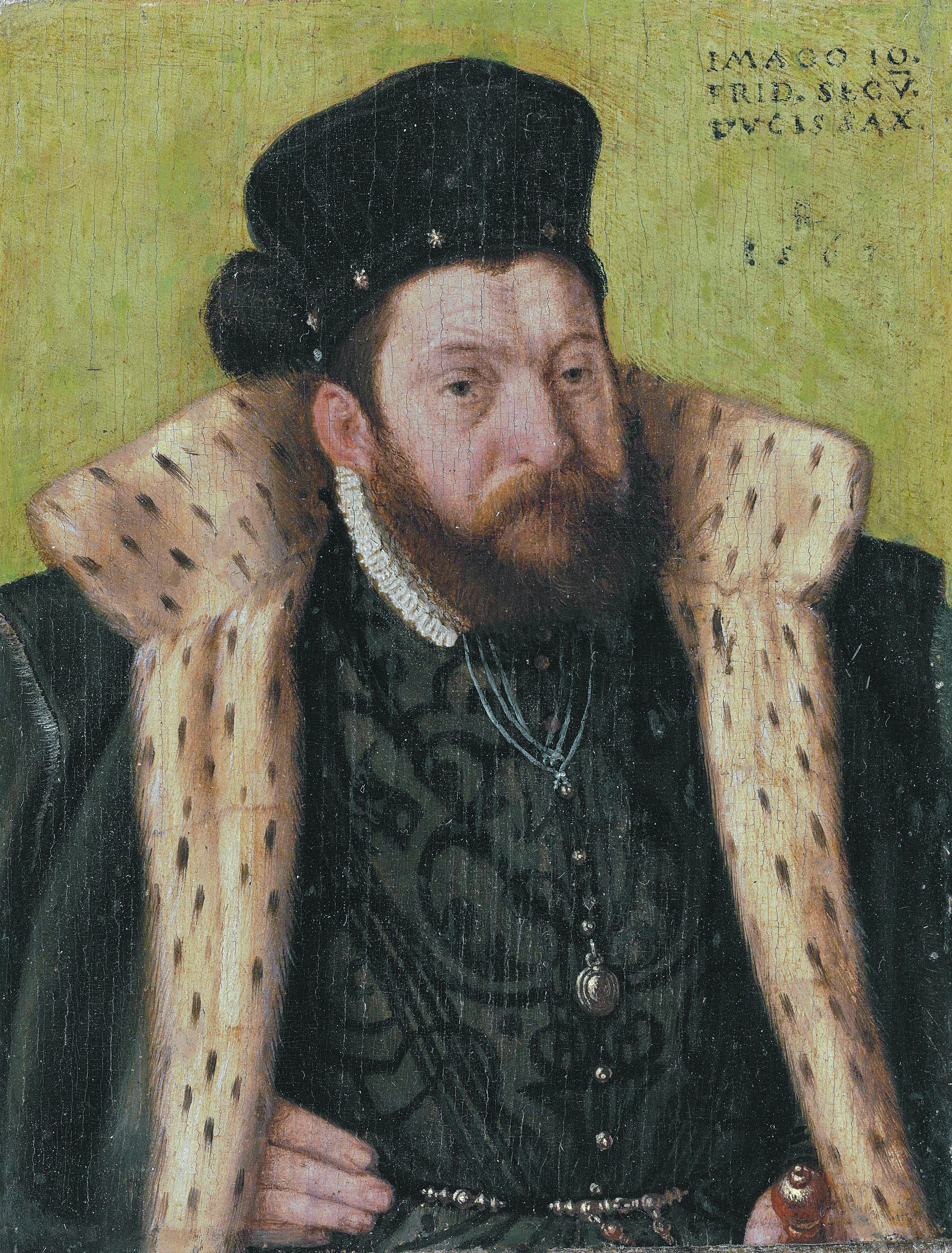

Duke of Saxony
- Reign: 3 March 1554 – November 1566
- Predecessor: John Frederick I
- Successor: John William

Landgrave of Thuringia
- Reign: 1554 – November 1566
- Predecessor: John Ernest
- Successor: John William
- Born: 8 January 1529; Torgau
- Died: 19 May 1595 (aged 66); Schloss Steyer, Upper Austria
- Burial: Morizkirche (Coburg)
- Spouse: Agnes of Hesse (m. 1555; died 1555) Countess Palatine Elisabeth of Simmern-Sponheim (m. 1558; died 1594)
- Issue among others...: John Casimir, Duke of Saxe-Coburg; John Ernest, Duke of Saxe-Eisenach
- House: Wettin (Ernestine line)
- Father: John Frederick I, Elector of Saxony
- Mother: Sibylle of Cleves
- Religion: Lutheran

John Frederick II of Saxony (German: Johann Friedrich II. von Sachsen; 8 January 1529 – 19 May 1595), was a prince of the Ernestine line of the House of Wettin. Although he nominally bore the title of Duke of Saxony, he in fact ruled the Saxon duchies of Coburg and Eisenach.

== Early life ==
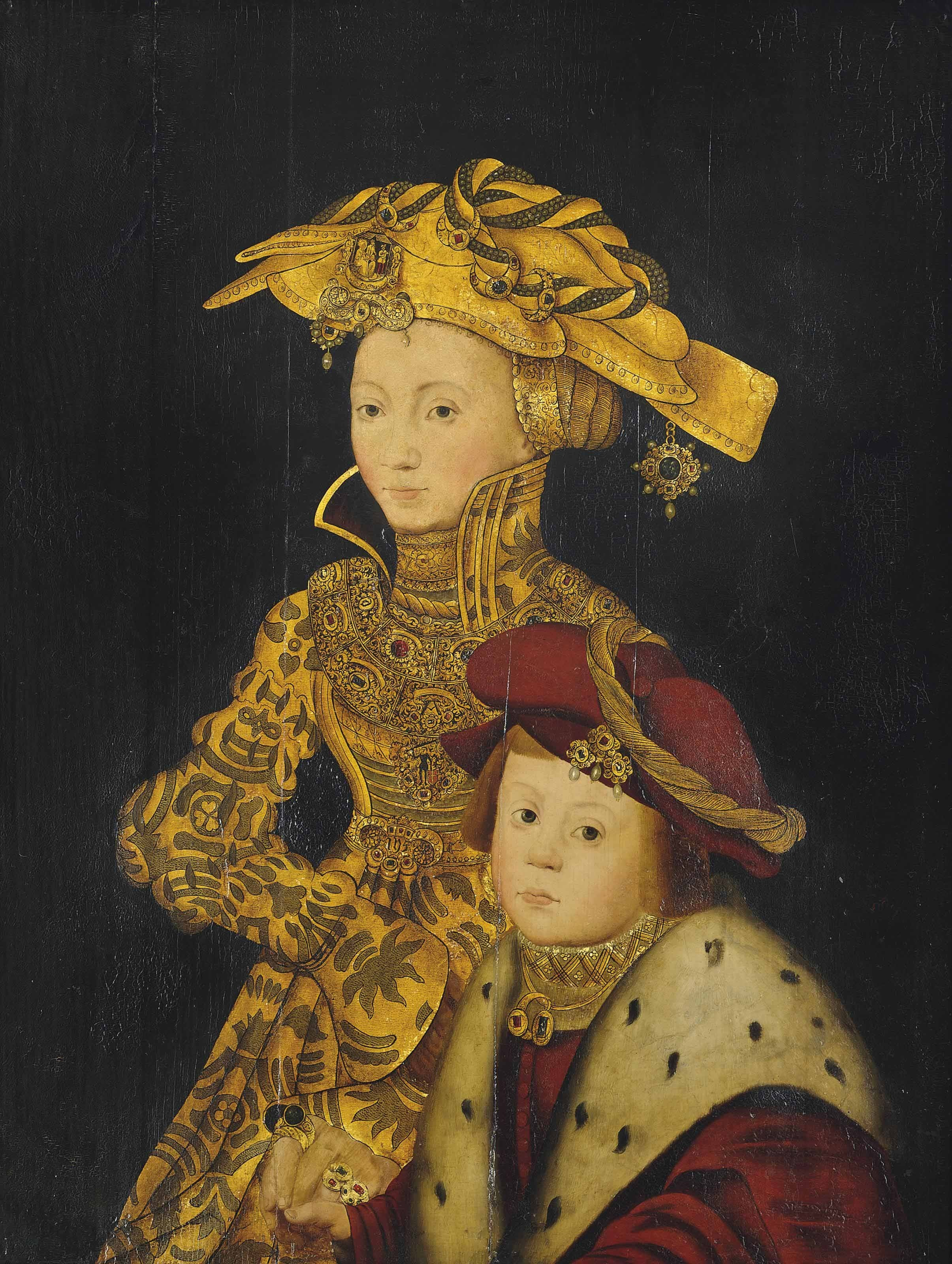
Sibylle of Cleves and one of her sons

John Frederick II was the eldest son of John Frederick I, Elector of Saxony and Sibylle of Cleves. He was given a comprehensive education along with his younger brother Johann Wilhelm under the guidance of the legal scholar Basilius Monner. The two brothers were invited to take part in the Aulic Council, where they were able to develop their knowledge of diplomacy at a young age.

== Reign and military ambitions ==
After the Battle of Mühlberg (24 April 1547) and the capture of his father, John Frederick II, along with his brother John William, succeeded their father as the regents of the lands still retained by their family. After the death of their father (1554), the brothers amicably divided the lands that were inherited from their father; even so, John Frederick II, remained as the exclusive regent for the family possessions. And even though he received Eisenach and Coburg in the divisionary treaty, John Frederick II chose Gotha as his place of residence while serving as head of the family.

John Frederick's political aspirations were still directed towards the reinstatement of his family's right to the title of "Elector of Saxony," as well as the re-establishment of the lands that were lost due to his father's imprisonment. In 1563 his prized general, Wilhelm von Grumbach attacked Würzburg, seized and plundered the city and compelled the chapter and the bishop to restore his lands. He was consequently placed under the imperial ban, but John Frederick II refused to obey the order of the Emperor Maximilian II to withdraw his forces. Meanwhile, Grumbach plotted the assassination of Saxon elector, Augustus; and proclamations were issued asking for assistance. Because of this, an end to alliances both inside and outside of Germany came about.

In November 1566 John Frederick was placed under the imperial ban, which had been placed against Grumbach earlier in the year, and Augustus marched against Gotha. Resistance from the people of Gotha was not forthcoming, and a mutiny led to the defeat of the town. Grumbach was delivered to his foes, and after being tortured, was executed at Gotha on 18 April 1567.

The Emperor imposed the Reichsacht (Imperial Ban) over John Frederick II, the current Elector of Saxony. The Reichsexekution (more or less an intervention against a single ruler in order to maintain the good of the entire empire) was also put into effect, in which John William, John Frederick's own brother, took part. After a siege of his castle in Gotha in 1566, John Frederick was eventually defeated and spent the rest of his life as an imperial prisoner. His possessions were confiscated by the emperor and handed over to John William, who became the sole ruler of the whole duchy of Saxony.

== Marriages and children ==
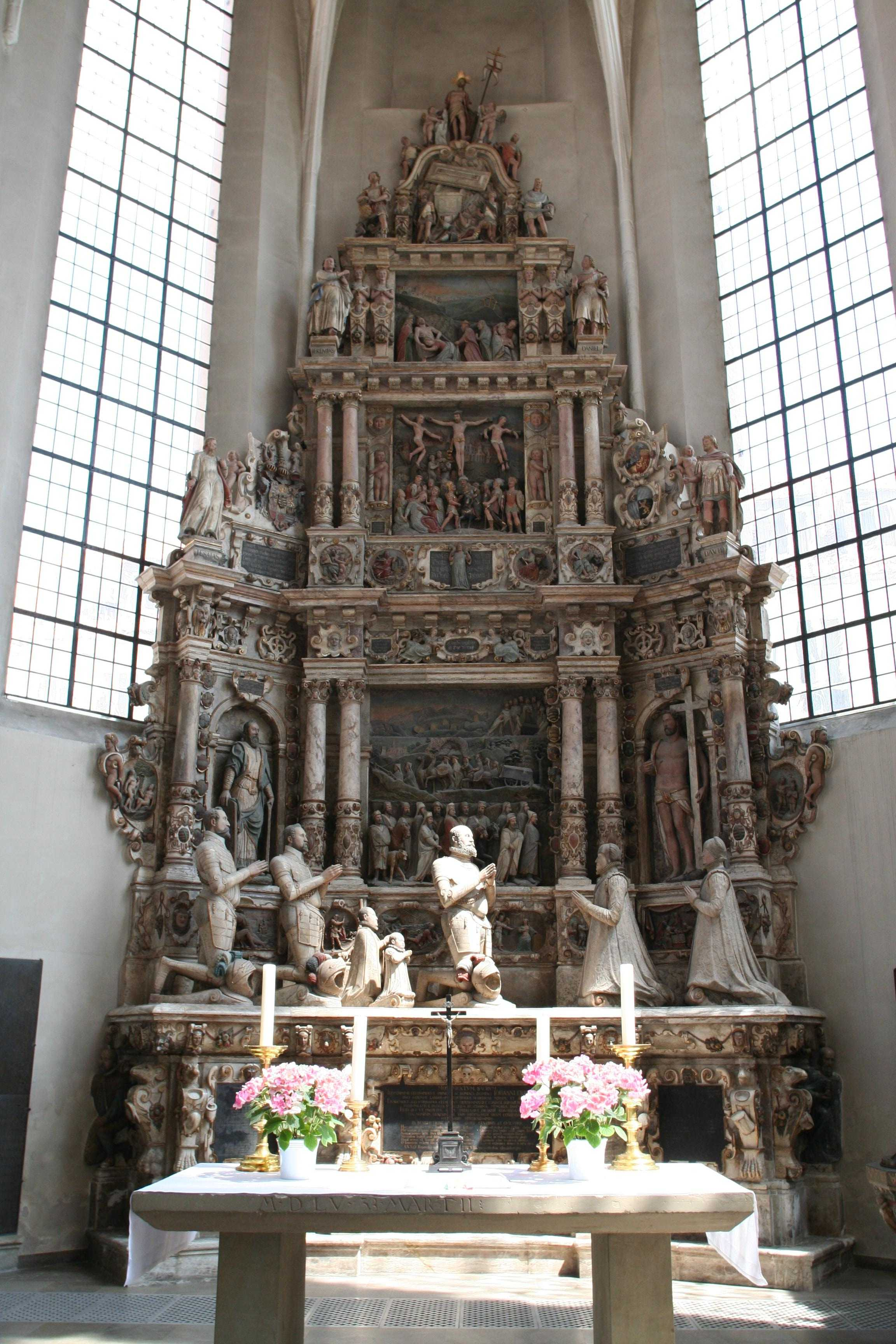
Renaissance epitaph for Duke John Frederick II

In Weimar on 26 May 1555 John Frederick II married his first wife, Agnes of Hesse, Dowager Electress of Saxony. Six months later she suffered a miscarriage and died, on 4 November 1555.

In Weimar on 12 June 1558 John Frederick II married his second wife, Countess Palatine Elisabeth of Simmern-Sponheim, daughter of the later (1559) Frederick III, Elector Palatine. They had four sons:

- John Frederick (30 November 1559, Weimar – 8 August 1560, Weimar) died in infancy.
- Frederick Henry (3 February 1563, Heldburg – 4 August 1572, Eisenberg) died in childhood.
- John Casimir, Duke of Saxe-Coburg (12 June 1564, Gotha – 16 July 1633, Coburg)
- John Ernest, Duke of Saxe-Eisenach (9 July 1566, Gotha – 23 October 1638, Eisenach)

== Succession ==
Later, the Emperor used the two surviving sons of John Frederick II against their uncle John William; in 1572 the Division of Erfurt was made. The duchy of Saxony was divided into three parts. The older son, John Casimir, received Coburg, and the younger, John Ernest, received Eisenach. John William retained only the smaller part, the limited region of Weimar, but he added to his duchy the districts of Altenburg, Gotha and Meiningen. Since it has several Ernestine dynasties, Thuringia was also given in this division, the total possession of the Wettins (the duchy of Saxony) that had always bordered each other were no longer combined. From John William descends the house of Saxe-Weimar and the first house of Saxe-Altenburg, which separated later from Saxe-Weimar.

John Frederick II died in 1595 and was buried in a large tomb by sculptor Nikolaus Bergner at Morizkirche at Coburg, which his son John Casimir built for him and his wife, Elisabeth. The coffins are today in the crypt beneath the church.

== Ancestors ==
Ancestors of John Frederick II of Saxony

16. Frederick II, Elector of Saxony
8. Ernest, Elector of Saxony
17. Margaret of Austria
4. John, Elector of Saxony
18. Albert III, Duke of Bavaria
9. Elisabeth of Bavaria
19. Anna of Brunswick-Grubenhagen-Einbeck
2. John Frederick I, Elector of Saxony
20. Henry IV, Duke of Mecklenburg
10. Magnus II, Duke of Mecklenburg
21. Dorothea of Brandenburg
5. Sophie of Mecklenburg
22. Eric II, Duke of Pomerania
11. Sophie of Pomerania-Wolgast
23. Sophia of Pomerania-Stolp
1. John Frederick II, Duke of Saxony
24. John I, Duke of Cleves
12. John II, Duke of Cleves
25. Elizabeth of Nevers
6. John III, Duke of Cleves
26. Henry III, Landgrave of Upper Hesse
13. Matilda of Hesse
27. Anna of Katzenelnbogen
3. Sibylle of Cleves
28. Gerhard VII, Duke of Jülich-Berg
14. William IV, Duke of Jülich-Berg
29. Sophie of Saxe-Lauenburg
7. Maria of Jülich-Berg
30. Albert III Achilles, Elector of Brandenburg
15. Sibylle of Brandenburg
31. Anna of Saxony

John Frederick II of Saxony House of Wettin Born: 8 January 1529 Died: 19 May 1595
Preceded by John Frederick I	Duke of Saxony; 1554–1566	Succeeded by John William
