= Princess Elisabeth Sophie of Saxe-Altenburg =

Elisabeth Sophie of Saxe-Altenburg
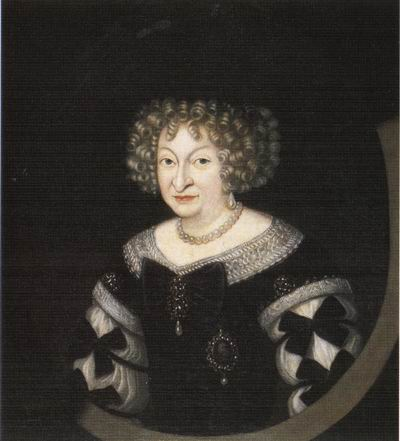

Duchess consort of Saxe-Gotha and Saxe-Altenburg
- Tenure: 1640 – 26 March 1675
- Born: 10 October 1619; Halle
- Died: 20 December 1680 (aged 61); Gotha
- Spouse: Ernst I, Duke of Saxe-Gotha (m. 1636; died 1675)
- Issue: Johann Ernest; Elisabeth Dorothea, Landgravine of Hesse-Darmstadt; Johann Ernest; Christian; Sophie; Johanna; Frederick I, Duke of Saxe-Gotha-Altenburg; Albert, Duke of Saxe-Coburg; Bernhard I, Duke of Saxe-Meiningen; Henry, Duke of Saxe-Römhild; Christian, Duke of Saxe-Eisenberg; Princess Dorothea Maria; Ernest, Duke of Saxe-Hildburghausen; Johann Philip; Johann Ernest IV, Duke of Saxe-Coburg-Saalfeld; Johanna Elisabeth; Johann Philip; Sophie Elisabeth
- House: House of Wettin
- Father: Johann Philipp, Duke of Saxe-Altenburg
- Mother: Elisabeth of Brunswick-Wolfenbüttel
- Religion: Lutheranism

Elisabeth Sophie of Saxe-Altenburg (10 October 1619 – 20 December 1680) was a princess of Saxe-Altenburg and by marriage a duchess of Saxe-Gotha.

She was born in Halle as the only daughter of Johann Philipp, Duke of Saxe-Altenburg and his wife, Elisabeth of Brunswick-Wolfenbüttel.

== Life ==
In Altenburg on 24 October 1636, the 17-year-old Elisabeth Sophie married her 34-year-old kinsman Ernst I, Duke of Saxe-Gotha. As a dower, she received 20,000 guilders, which were pledged by the town of Roßla. As a widow's seat, the adolescent bride obtained the towns of Kapellendorf and Berka, with the latter called Gartenhaus in Weimar. Elisabeth Sophie was constantly pregnant for much of her marriage, giving birth almost once a year, but half of her children went on to die in childhood or adolescence; three of them died within weeks of each other in December 1657 due to a smallpox outbreak.

Due to the succession laws of the House of Saxe-Altenburg (which excluded women from inheritance), her father was succeeded by his brother, Frederick William II, after he died a year and a half later on 1 April 1639.

When her cousin, the duke Frederick William III, died childless in 1672, Elisabeth Sophie became in the general heiress of the whole branch of Saxe-Altenburg on the basis of her father's testament (as it was ultimately recognized in law that the Salic law did not prevent an agnate from willing all his possessions to those other agnates of the house he desired to make his heirs, leaving other agnates without; and if those favored agnates also happened to be the testator's son-in-law and maternal grandsons, that was in no way prohibited).

Ernest I of Saxe-Gotha claimed the whole succession of Saxe-Altenburg on the basis of both being the closest male relative and his wife's rights. However, the other branch of the family, the Dukes of Saxe-Weimar, did not accept that will, opening a succession dispute.

Finally, Elisabeth Sophie and Ernst's sons received most of the Saxe-Altenburg inheritance, but a portion (a quarter of the original duchy of Saxe-Altenburg) passed to the Saxe-Weimar branch. Hence, the Ernestine line of Saxe-Gotha-Altenburg was founded, which would exist until 1825.

When Duke Ernest I died in 1675, his numerous sons divided the inheritance (five eighths of all Ernestine lands) into seven parts: Gotha-Altenburg, Coburg, Meiningen, Römhild, Eisenberg, Hildburghausen and Saalfeld. Of them, Coburg, Römhild and Eisenberg did not survive over that one generation and were divided between the four remaining lines.

Of the four remaining duchies, only two branches survived until today: Meiningen and Saalfeld (which eventually became the house of Saxe-Coburg-Gotha). Through the Saalfeld branch, Elisabeth Sophie was a direct ancestress of the English royal family.

After her husband's death, Elisabeth Sophie exchanged the towns originally given to her as widow's seat in her marriage contract for the towns of Reinhardsbrunn and Tenneberg. Under the name "the Chaste", she became a member of the Virtuous Society. She died in Gotha, aged 61.

== Issue ==
Only nine of Ernst and Elisabeth Sophie's eighteen children survived into mature adulthood:

1. Johann Ernest (b. Weimar, 18 September 1638 – d. Weimar, 27 November 1638), died in infancy.
2. Elisabeth Dorothea (b. Coburg, 8 January 1640 – d. Butzbach, 24 August 1709), married on 5 December 1666 to Louis VI, Landgrave of Hesse-Darmstadt.
3. Johann Ernest (b. Gotha, 16 May 1641 – d. of smallpox, Gotha, 31 December 1657), died in adolescence.
4. Christian (b. and d. Gotha, 23 February 1642).
5. Sophie (b. Gotha, 21 February 1643 – d. of smallpox, Gotha, 14 December 1657), died in adolescence.
6. Johanna (b. Gotha, 14 February 1645 – d. [of smallpox?] Gotha, 7 December 1657), died in adolescence.
7. Frederick I, Duke of Saxe-Gotha-Altenburg (b. Gotha, 15 July 1646 – d. Friedrichswerth, 2 August 1691).
8. Albert, Duke of Saxe-Coburg (b. Gotha, 24 May 1648 – d. Coburg, 6 August 1699).
9. Bernhard I, Duke of Saxe-Meiningen (b. Gotha, 10 September 1649 – d. Meiningen, 27 April 1706).
10. Henry, Duke of Saxe-Römhild (b. Gotha, 19 November 1650 – d. Römhild, 13 May 1710).
11. Christian, Duke of Saxe-Eisenberg (b. Gotha, 6 January 1653 – d. Eisenberg, 28 April 1707).
12. Dorothea Maria (b. Gotha, 12 February 1654 – d. Gotha, 17 June 1682).
13. Ernest, Duke of Saxe-Hildburghausen (b. Gotha, 12 June 1655 – d. Hildburghausen, 17 October 1715).
14. Johann Philip (b. Gotha, 1 March 1657 – d. Gotha, 19 May 1657), died in early childhood.
15. Johann Ernest, Duke of Saxe-Coburg-Saalfeld (b. Gotha, 22 August 1658 – d. Saalfeld, 17 February 1729).
16. Johanna Elisabeth (b. Gotha, 2 September 1660 – d. Gotha, 18 December 1660), died in infancy.
17. Johann Philip (b. Gotha, 16 November 1661 – d. Gotha, 13 March 1662), died in infancy.
18. Sophie Elisabeth (b. Gotha, 19 May 1663 – d. Gotha, 23 May 1663), died in infancy.

Their eldest surviving son Frederick was the first to inherit this title. His granddaughter from this son, Anna Sophie of Saxe-Gotha-Altenburg, was a direct matrilineal ancestor of George V of the United Kingdom and Nicholas II of Russia. His younger son John was the father of Franz Josias, Duke of Saxe-Coburg-Saalfeld.

== Ancestry ==
Ancestors of Princess Elisabeth Sophie of Saxe-Altenburg

8. Johann Wilhelm, Duke of Saxe-Weimar
4. Friedrich Wilhelm I, Duke of Saxe-Weimar
9. Dorothea Susanne of Simmern
2. Johann Philipp, Duke of Saxe-Altenburg
10. Philipp Ludwig, Count Palatine of Neuburg
5. Countess Palatine Anna Maria of Neuburg
11. Anna of Cleves
1. Princess Elisabeth Sophie of Saxe-Altenburg
12. Julius, Duke of Brunswick-Lüneburg
6. Henry Julius, Duke of Brunswick-Lüneburg
13. Hedwig of Brandenburg
3. Elisabeth of Brunswick-Wolfenbüttel
14. Frederick II of Denmark
7. Elizabeth of Denmark
15. Sophie of Mecklenburg-Güstrow

== Notes ==
Princess Elisabeth Sophie of Saxe-Altenburg House of Saxe-Altenburg Cadet branch of the House of Wettin Born: 10 October 1619 Died: 20 December 1680
German royalty
New creation	Duchess consort of Saxe-Gotha; 1640 – 26 March 1675	The two states that shared a personal union merged into one. When Saxe-Altenburg was recreated the successor was: Duchess Amelia of Württemberg
Vacant Title last held by Magdalene Sibylle of Saxony	Duchess consort of Saxe-Altenburg; 14 April 1672 – 26 March 1675	The two states that shared a personal union merged into one. When Saxe-Altenburg was recreated the successor was: Duchess Amelia of Württemberg
