= Saxe-Gotha =

Saxon duchy of the Wettin dynasty

Duchy of Saxe-Gotha Herzogtum Sachsen-Gotha (German)
- 1640–1680
- Coat of arms

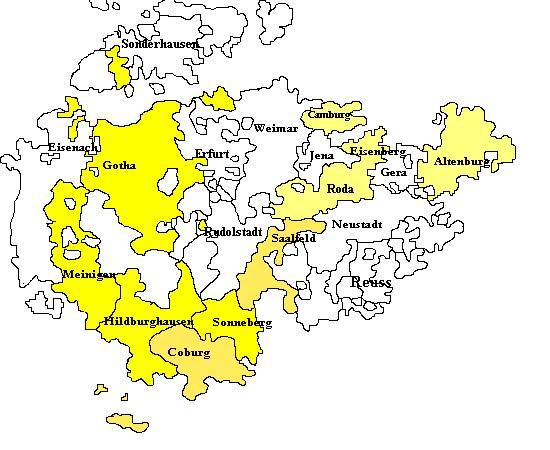
- Thuringia, showing the combined territory of Saxe-Gotha and Saxe-Altenburg from 1672, before it was again divided in 1680
- Status: State of the Holy Roman Empire
- Capital: Gotha
- Government: Principality
- Historical era: Early modern Europe
  - Partitioned from Saxe-Weimar: 1640
  - Acquired half of Saxe-Eisenach: 1644
  - Acquired major part of Saxe-Altenburg: 1672
  - Partitioned in seven: 1680
Preceded by
Saxe-Weimar
Succeeded by
Saxe-Coburg
Saxe-Eisenberg
Saxe-Gotha-Altenburg
Saxe-Hildburghausen
Saxe-Meiningen
Saxe-Römhild
Saxe-Saalfeld

Saxe-Gotha (German: Sachsen-Gotha) was one of the Saxon duchies held by the Ernestine branch of the Wettin dynasty in the former Landgraviate of Thuringia. The ducal residence was erected at Gotha.

== History ==
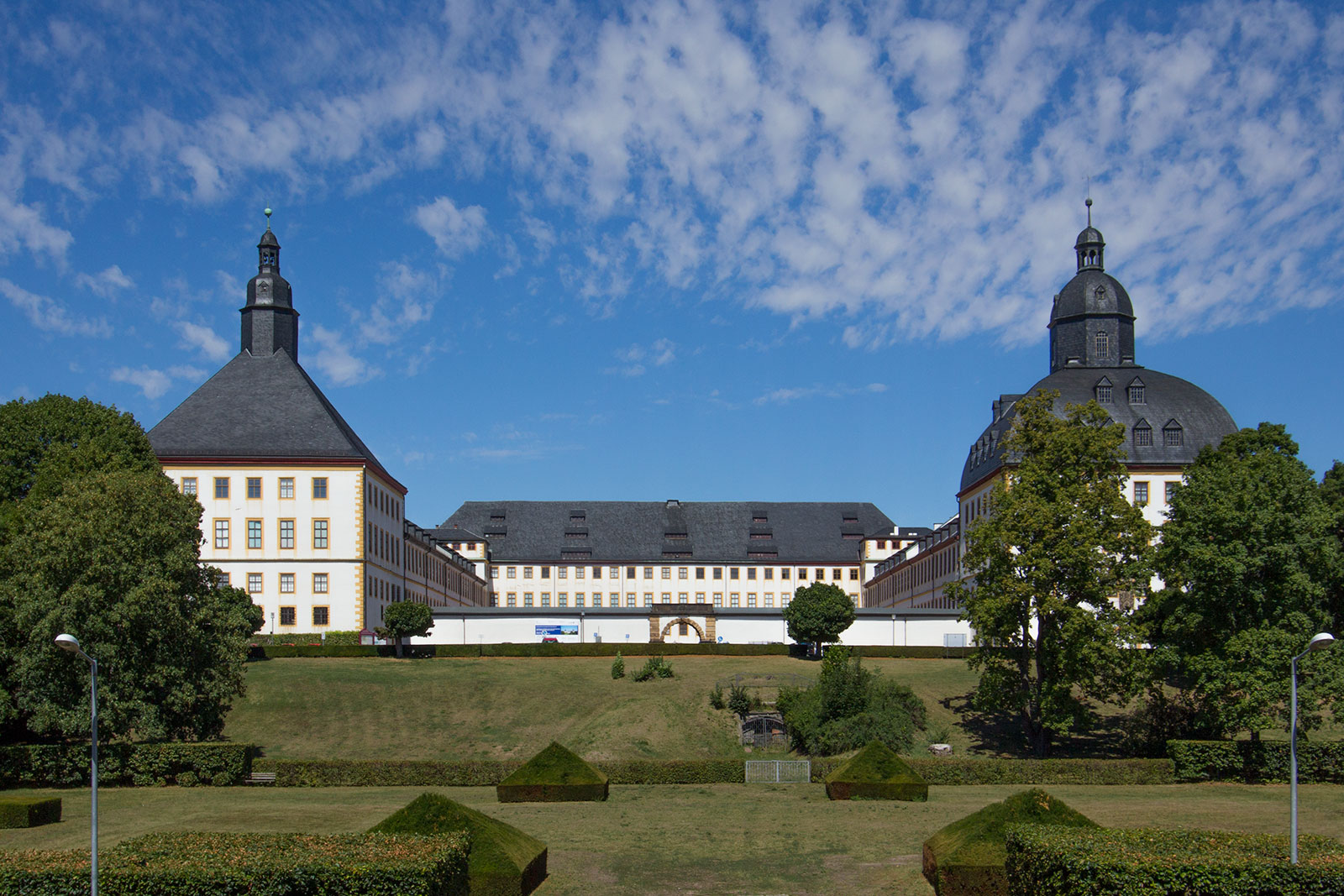
Gotha: Schloss Friedenstein

The duchy was established in 1640, when Duke Wilhelm von Saxe-Weimar created a subdivision for his younger brother Ernest I the Pious. Duke Ernest took his residence at Gotha, where he had Schloss Friedenstein built between 1643 and 1654. At the same time, the Duchy of Saxe-Eisenach was created for the third brother Albert IV.

Nevertheless, Albert died in 1644, and Ernest inherited large parts of his duchy, though not the core territory around the residence at Eisenach and the Wartburg, which fell to his elder brother Wilhelm of Saxe-Weimar. Ernest could also incorporate several remaining estates of the extinct House of Henneberg in 1660, which had been vacant since 1583. Finally in 1672 he received the major part of Saxe-Altenburg through his wife Elisabeth Sophie, after Altenburg's last duke Frederick William III had died without heirs. Ernest would then be called Duke of Saxe-Gotha-Altenburg.

When Ernest died in 1675, he left his seven sons a significantly enlarged territory. The eldest, Frederick I at first ruled jointly with his brothers until in 1680 the duchy was divided. The area around Gotha and also Altenburg passed to Frederick I, who retained the title of a Duke of Saxe-Gotha-Altenburg. For later history of the duchy, see Saxe-Gotha-Altenburg.

== Dukes of Saxe-Gotha ==
- Ernest I the Pious (1640–75), Duke of Saxe-Gotha-Altenburg from 1672
- Frederick I, Duke of Saxe-Gotha-Altenburg (1675–1691), jointly with his brothers until 1680:
  - Albert V, became Duke of Saxe-Coburg
  - Bernhard I, became Duke of Saxe-Meiningen
  - Heinrich, became Duke of Saxe-Römhild
  - Christian, became Duke of Saxe-Eisenberg
  - Ernest, became Duke of Saxe-Hildburghausen
  - John Ernest IV, became Duke of Saxe-Saalfeld

When the house of Saxe-Gotha and Altenburg became extinct in 1825, Saxe-Gotha-Altenburg was split. Saxe-Gotha passed to the Duke of Saxe-Coburg-Saalfeld who in turn gave Saalfeld to Saxe-Meiningen. The Duke of Saxe-Hildburghausen received Saxe-Altenburg, and gave the district of Hildburghausen to Saxe-Meiningen.

After the abolition of German monarchies at the end of the First World War it became a part of the newly created state of Thuringia in 1920.
