= Saxe-Römhild =

European polity

Duchy of Saxe-Römhild Herzogtum Sachsen-Römhild (German)
- 1680–1710
- Saxony-Römhild (around 1680)
- Status: State of the Holy Roman Empire
- Capital: Römhild
- Government: Principality
- History
  - Partitioned from Saxe-Gotha: 1680 1680
  - Extinction of line: 1710 1710
Preceded by	Succeeded by
Saxe-Gotha	Saxe-Coburg-Saalfeld

Saxe-Römhild (German: Sachsen-Römhild) was an Ernestine duchy in the southern foothills of the Thuringian Forest. It existed for only 30 years, from 1680 to 1710.

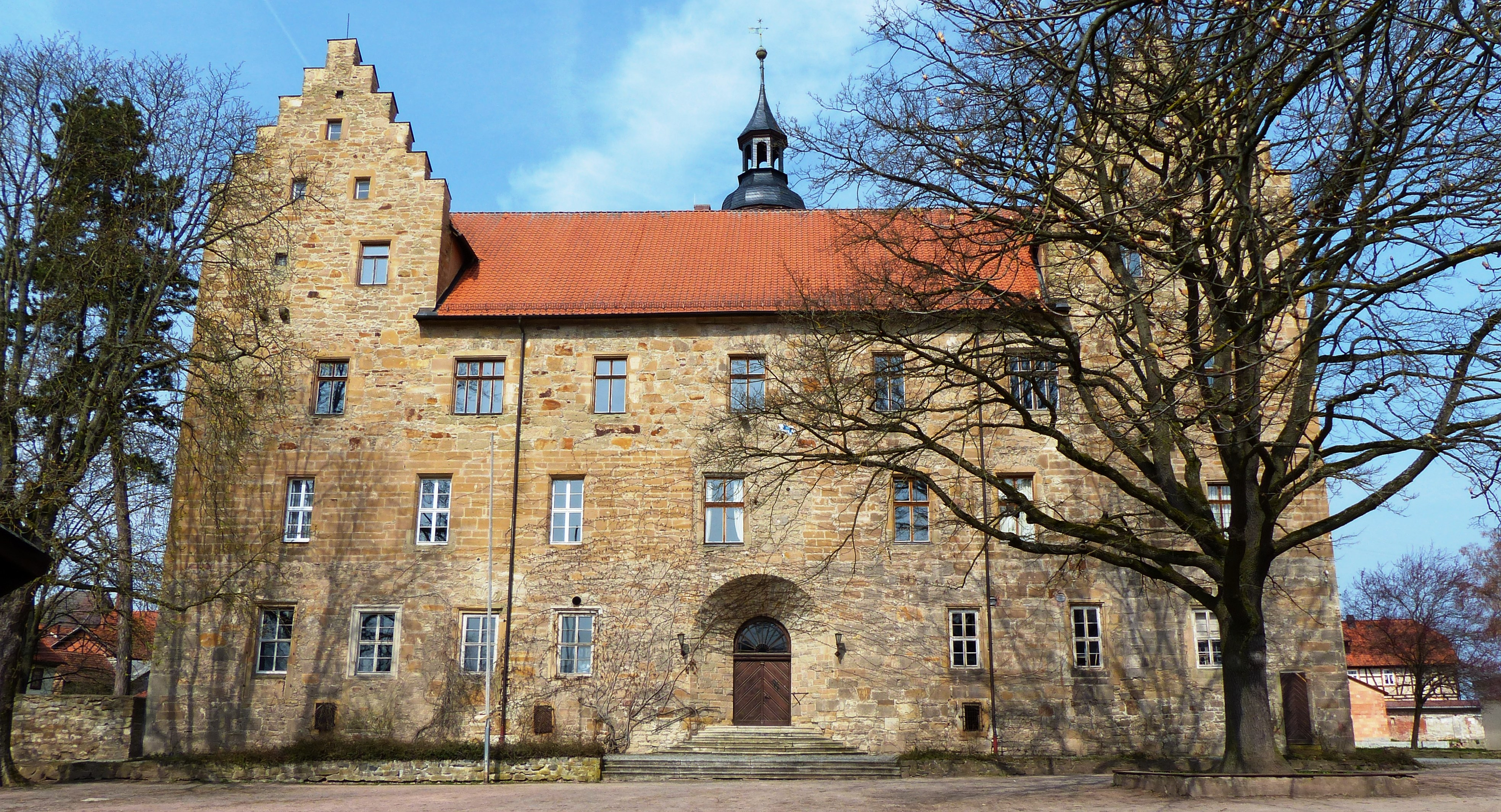
Glücksburg Castle in Römhild

== History ==
After the duke of Saxe-Gotha, Ernest the Pious, died on 26 March 1675 in Gotha, the duchy was divided on 24 February 1680 among his seven surviving sons. The lands of Saxe-Römhild went to the fourth son, who became Henry, Duke of Saxe-Römhild (1650–1710). The new duchy included the Districts of Römhild, Königsberg (which was later lost in 1683 to Saxe-Hildburghausen) and Themar, the winery of Behrungen, the monastery estate of Milz, and certain lands of the Echter family of Mespelbrunn that had been lost in 1665 to Saxony. But Duke Henry never had the full sovereignty of his new domains. The actual administration was left to the higher authorities in Gotha – the so-called Nexus Gothanus – because that was the residence of Henry's oldest brother, who ruled as Frederick I, Duke of Saxe-Gotha-Altenburg.

After the death of the childless Henry in 1710, his domains were divided among the four duchies – Saxe-Gotha-Altenburg, Saxe-Coburg-Saalfeld, Saxe-Meiningen and Saxe-Hildburghausen. Saxe-Gotha-Altenburg took seven-twelfths of the District of Themar. Saxe-Coburg-Saalfeld had five-twelfths of the District of Themar and one-third of the District of Römhild. Two-thirds of the District of Römhild went to Saxe-Meiningen. Saxe-Hildburghausen got the rest – the winery of Behrungen, the estate of Milz and the Echter properties.

With the rearrangement of the Ernestine duchies in 1826, all the territories of the former Duchy of Saxe-Römhild were solely concentrated in the Duchy of Saxe-Meiningen.

== Duke of Saxe-Römhild ==
- 1680–1710 : Henry (1650–1710)

== Bibliography ==
- (in German) Georg [Karl Friedrich Viktor] von Alten, Handbuch für Heer und Flotte, Band XIII [Handbook for the Army and Navy, Volume XIII] (Berlin, Leipzig, Wien, Stuttgart: Bong & Co., 1913)
- (in German) Hans Patze, Walter Schlesinger (ed.), Geschichte Thüringens, 5. Band, 1. Teil, 1. Teilbd.: Politische Geschichte in der Neuzeit [History of Thuringia, Volume 5, Part 1, Chapter 1: Political History in the Modern Times] (Cologne: Böhlau, 1982)
- (in German) Verein für Sachsen-Meiningische Geschichte und Landeskunde [Association of the History and Culture of Saxe-Meningen] (ed.): Neue Landeskunde des Herzogtums Sachsen-Meiningen, 9, B, Geschichtliches; Teil 1: Thüringische Geschichte [New State History of the Duchy of Saxe-Hildburghausen, 9, B, Histories; Part 1: Thuringian History] (Hildburghausen: Kesselbring, 1903)
