= Emilio Piani =

German painter (1817–1862)

Ludwig Friedrich Emil Piani (Emilio Piani) (1817–1862) – a portrait and landscape German painter born in Coburg, duchy of Saxe-Coburg-Saalfeld, Germany. As child he was a playmate of the Prince Albert, the future husband of Victoria, the Queen of the United Kingdom of Great Britain. In 1837 Emil Piani made a trip to the United States and then to Cuba residing in the later approximately till 1846. In 1841 his studio was on Obispo Street, Havana, probably where today is the Florida Hotel. During his stay in Cuba made several trips to nearby countries like Jamaica. In both islands he painted several portraits of notable persons and landscapes. In 1852 he returned to Coburg and after few years came back again to the Caribbean. He died in Curaçao in 1862.
