= 1919 Saxe-Meiningen state election =

German state election

The 1919 Saxe-Meiningen state election was held on 9 March 1919 to elect the 24 members of the Landtag of Saxe-Meiningen.

== Results ==
| Party | Votes | % | Seats |
|---|---|---|---|
| Social Democratic Party of Germany | 57,739 | 52.20 | 13 |
| German National People's Party | 20,214 | 18.28 | 5 |
| German Democratic Party | 17,076 | 15.44 | 3 |
| Independent Social Democratic Party of Germany | 8,456 | 7.64 | 2 |
| German People's Party | 7,124 | 6.44 | 1 |
| Total | 110,609 | 100.00 | 24 |
| Registered voters/turnout | 160,417 | – | |
Source: Elections in the Weimar Republic,
