= Sophie Hedwig of Saxe-Merseburg =

Duchess of Saxe-Coburg-Saalfeld
- Tenure: 18 February 1680 – 2 August 1686
- Born: 4 August 1660; Merseburg
- Died: 2 August 1686 (aged 25); Saalfeld
- Spouse: Johann Ernest, Duke of Saxe-Coburg-Saalfeld
- Issue: Christian Ernest II, Duke of Saxe-Coburg-Saalfeld; Charlotte Wilhelmine, Countess of Hanau-Münzenberg
Names
- Sophie Hedwig of Saxe-Merseburg
- House: House of Wettin
- Father: Christian I, Duke of Saxe-Merseburg
- Mother: Christiana of Schleswig-Holstein-Sonderburg-Glücksburg

Sophie Hedwig of Saxe-Merseburg (4 August 1660 - 2 August 1686), was a German noblewoman member of the House of Wettin and by marriage Duchess of Saxe-Saalfeld.

== Biography ==
Born in Merseburg, she was a child of Christian I, Duke of Saxe-Merseburg and his wife, Christiana of Schleswig-Holstein-Sonderburg-Glücksburg. In 1680, Sophie Hedwig married Johann Ernest, Duke of Saxe-Coburg-Saalfeld. Both belonged to the House of Wettin: she was a member of the Albertine, while her husband belonged to the Ernestine branch. Three years before (1677) one of Sophie Hedwig's sisters, Christiane, married Christian, Duke of Saxe-Eisenberg, in turn one of Johann Ernest's older brothers, so probably this marriage was instrumental for her future wedding.

The union produced five children, of whom only two survive adulthood:

- Christiane Sophie (b. Saalfeld, 14 June 1681 – d. Saalfeld, 3 June 1697).
- Stillborn daughter (Saalfeld, 6 May 1682).
- Christian Ernst, Duke of Saxe-Coburg-Saalfeld (b. Saalfeld, 18 August 1683 – d. Saalfeld, 4 September 1745).
- Charlotte Wilhelmine (b. Saalfeld, 4 May 1685 – d. Hanau, 5 April 1767), married on 26 December 1705 to Philip Reinhard, Count of Hanau-Münzenberg.
- Stillborn son (Saalfeld, 2 August 1686).

== Death ==
Sophie Hedwig died in childbirth in Saalfeld, two days before her twenty-six birthday. She was buried in the Johanniskirche, Saalfeld.

Sophie Hedwig of Saxe-Merseburg House of Wettin Born: 4 August 1660 Died: 2 August 1686
German royalty
New creation	Duchess consort of Saxe-Saalfeld; 1680-1686	Vacant Title next held by Charlotte Johanna of Waldeck-Wildungen
