= Saxe-Coburg-Saalfeld =

Saxon duchy, 1735–1826

Duchy of Saxe-Coburg-Saalfeld Herzogtum Sachsen-Coburg-Saalfeld (German)
- 1735–1826
- Coat of arms

- Saxony-Saalfeld (around 1680)

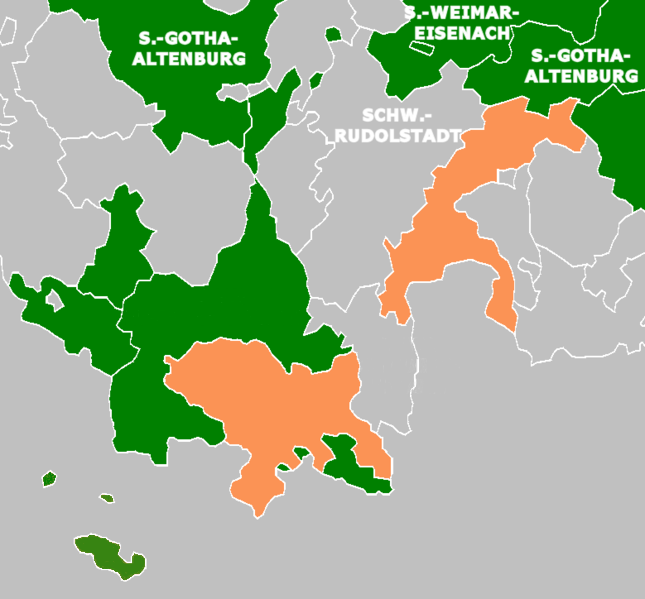
- Saxe-Coburg-Saalfeld, shown among the other Ernestine duchies
- Status: State of the Holy Roman Empire; State of the Confederation of the Rhine; State of the German Confederation
- Capital: Saalfeld (to 1764); Coburg thereafter
- Government: Duchy
- Duke
  - 1735–1745: Christian Ernest II (first)
  - 1806–1826: Ernest III (last)
- Historical era: Early Modern
  - Division of Erfurt: 1572
  - Coburg and Saalfeld united: 6 August 1735
  - Renamed on Imperial decision of Ernestine succession: 1735
  - Lost Saalfeld, gained Gotha, renamed: 11 February 1826
Preceded by	Succeeded by
Saxe-Coburg; Saxe-Saalfeld	Saxe-Coburg and Gotha; Saxe-Meiningen

Saxe-Coburg-Saalfeld (German: Sachsen-Coburg-Saalfeld) was one of the Saxon Duchies held by the Ernestine line of the House of Wettin. Established in 1699, the Saxe-Coburg-Saalfield line lasted until the reshuffle of the Ernestine territories that occurred following the extinction of the Saxe-Gotha line in 1825, in which the Saxe-Coburg-Saalfeld line received Gotha, but lost Saalfeld to Saxe-Meiningen.

== Saxe-Saalfeld 1680 to 1735 ==
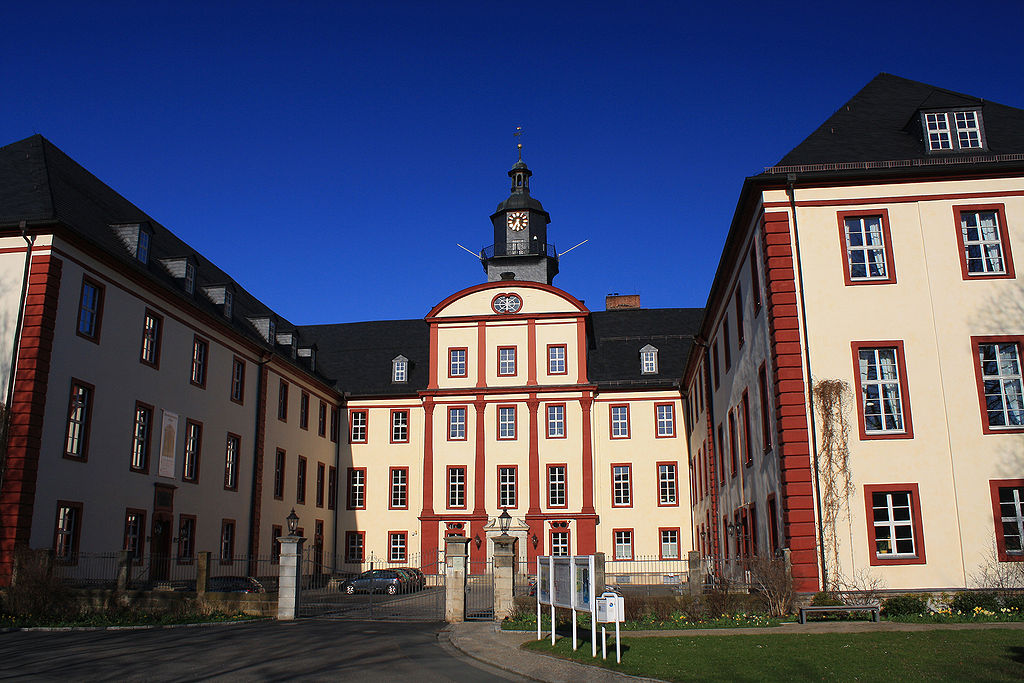
Schloss Saalfeld, built after 1677 as the ducal residence

After the Duke of Saxe-Gotha, Ernest the Pious, died on 26 March 1675 in Gotha, the Principality was divided on 24 February 1680 among his seven surviving sons. The lands of Saxe-Saalfeld went to the youngest of them, who became John Ernest IV (1658–1729), the Duke of Saxe-Saalfeld. But the new Principality did not have complete independence. It had to depend on the higher authorities in Gotha for the matters of administration of its three districts, Saalfeld, Grafenthal and Probstzella – the so-called "Nexus Gothanus" – because that was the residence of John Ernest's oldest brother, who ruled as Frederick I, Duke of Saxe-Gotha-Altenburg. Saalfeld was the residence of the Dukes of Saxe-Saalfeld from 1680 to 1735.

When Albert V, the Duke of Saxe-Coburg, died in 1699 without any surviving descendants, disputes arose over the inheritance, especially with Bernhard I of Saxe-Meiningen, and they were not settled until 1735. Most of the Saxe-Coburg properties were given to the new Ernestine line of Saxe-Saalfeld and the Principality of Saxe-Coburg-Saalfeld was born with John Ernest as its Duke (not Prince). However, the Districts of Sonneberg and Neuhaus am Rennweg had to be handed over to Saxe-Meiningen and the District of Sonnefeld had to be given to Saxe-Hildburghausen. One-third of the District of Römhild and five-twelfths of the District of Themar remained with Saxe-Coburg.

== Saxe-Coburg-Saalfeld 1735 to 1826 ==
After the death of John Ernest IV in 1729, his sons Christian Ernest II and Francis Josias ruled the country, consisting of two distinct and separate areas, together, but at different residences. Christian Ernst remained in Saalfeld, while Franz Josias chose Coburg as his residence. In 1745, when Christian Ernest II died childless, his domains were inherited by his brother, Duke Francis Josias. In 1747 Francis Josias was able to anchor his birthright (primogeniture) in the Line of Succession laws and confer it on his rapidly growing family for the long-term survival of the House of Saxe-Coburg-Saalfeld. His youngest son Prince Frederick Josias made himself and the Duchy famous with his sieges and victories as an Imperial general and field marshal in the Austro-Turkish War and the War of the First Coalition against France. His brother and Regent Duke Ernest Frederick was known more for the perilous finances of his Duchy, which underwent from 1773 onwards a forced management of debts by an Imperial Debit Commission until 1802 and affected the fortunes of his successors.

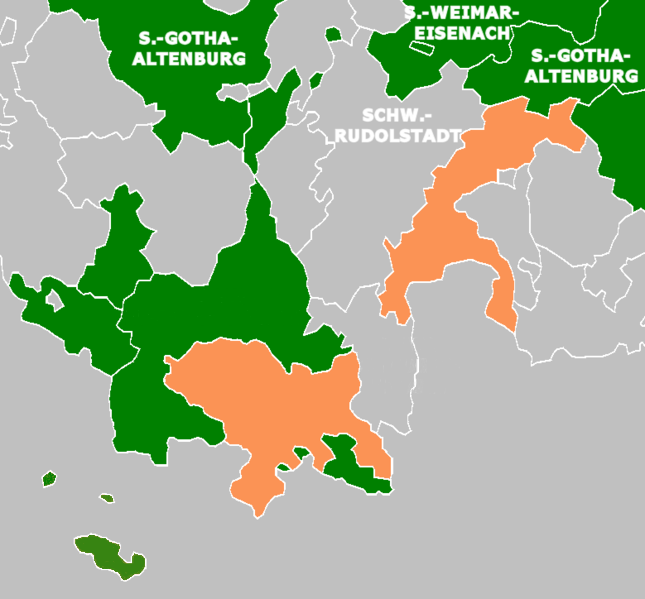
The Duchy of Saxe-Coburg-Saalfeld (orange) in 1820

Duke Francis Frederick Anton, who ruled for only six years (from 1800 to 1806), was forced in 1805, especially by his minister Theodor Konrad von Kretschmann, for the renewal of the ailing Duchy to make a contract between the two duchies, Coburg and Saalfeld, for a uniform state system with a state administration of the Principality, which regained its full independence in 1806 with the fall of the Holy Roman Empire.

It was the children of Duke Francis Frederick Anton who assured the dynastic success and survival of the House of Saxe-Coburg. The fame of Prince Frederick Josias led to the wedding of his daughter, Princess Juliane (later Grand Duchess Anna Feodorovna), with Grand Duke Constantine Pavlovich of Russia. Another daughter, Princess Marie Luise Victoire, married Prince Edward, Duke of Kent and Strathearn, in 1818, and became the mother of Queen Victoria. The youngest surviving son, Prince Leopold, was elected in 1831 as Leopold I, King of the Belgians. In 1816, his elder brother, Prince Ferdinand, married Maria Antonia Koháry de Csábrág, who came from one of the wealthiest aristocratic families in Hungary, and founded the Catholic line of Saxe-Coburg-Koháry. Their namesake son, Prince Ferdinand, became in 1837 Dom Fernando II, King of Portugal and the other son, Prince August, was the father of Ferdinand I, who became the Sovereign Prince of Bulgaria in 1887 and the Tsar in 1908. In addition, the heir to the throne of Saxe-Coburg was Prince Ernst, who became Duke Ernest III in 1806. He was the father of Prince Albert, who married his cousin, Queen Victoria, in 1840 and became The Prince Consort of Great Britain and Ireland.

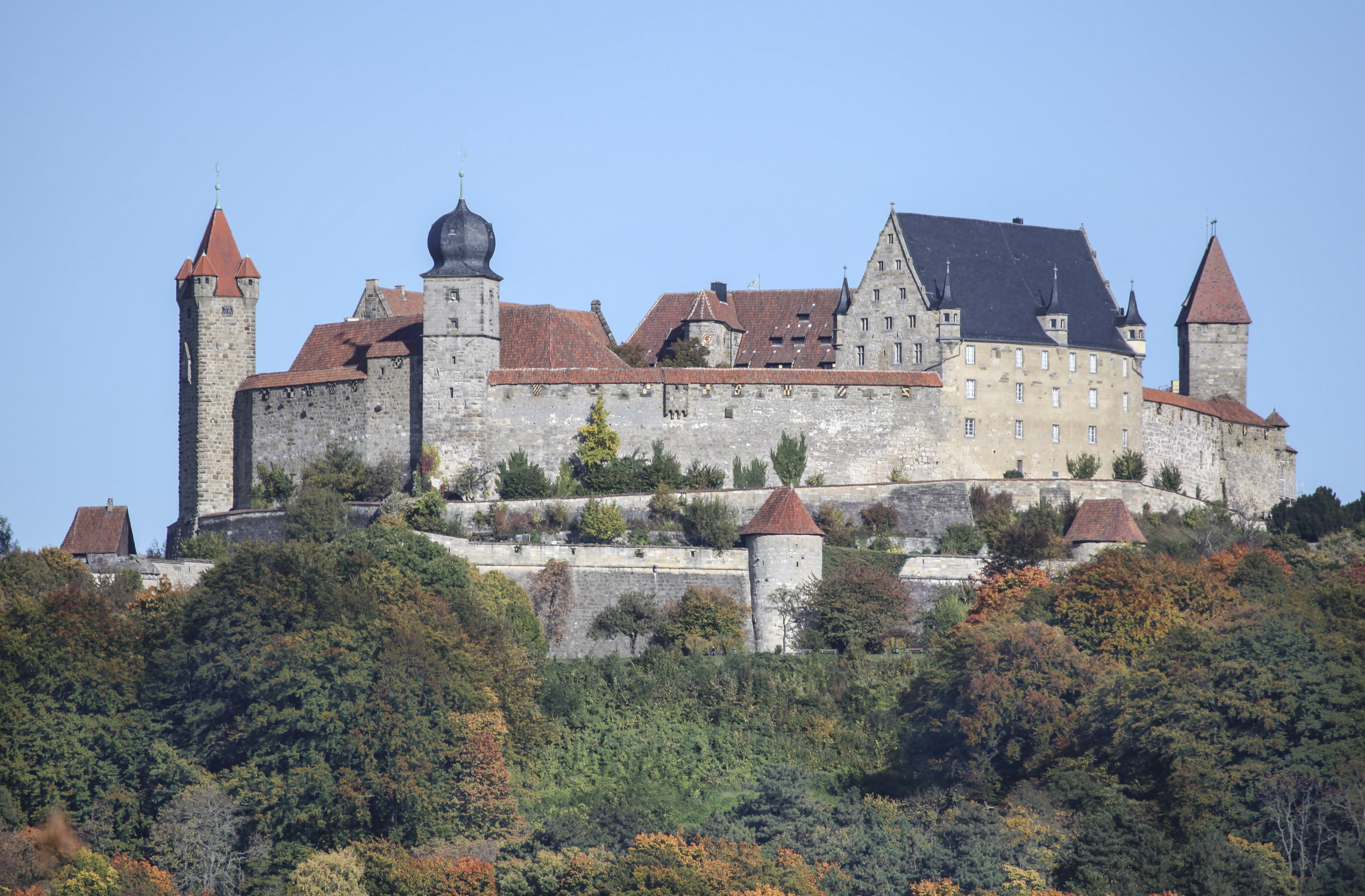
Coburg Castle

On 15 December 1806, Saxe-Coburg-Saalfeld, along with the other Ernestine duchies, entered the Confederation of the Rhine. From November 1806 until the Peace of Tilsit in July 1807, the Principality was occupied by the French. Only then Duke Ernst I was able to return from his exile in Königsberg in East Prussia. A border treaty with the Kingdom of Bavaria in 1811 led to a territorial swap of the disputed territories. The towns of Fürth am Berg, Hof an der Steinach, Niederfüllbach and Triebsdorf came to Saxe-Coburg; Gleußen, the Schleifenhan mill, Buch am Forst and Herreth went to Bavaria. In 1815, as the reward for fighting in 1813 on the Allied side against Napoleon, the Congress of Vienna sent an area left of the Rhine River, later called the Principality of Lichtenberg, a territorial gain as well as membership in the German Confederation for the sovereign. On 8 August 1821, the Duchy received a constitution.

The extinction of the oldest line, Saxe-Gotha-Altenburg in 1825 again led to inheritance disputes among the other lines of the Ernestine family. On 12 November 1826 the decision, from the arbitration of the supreme head of the family, King Frederick Augustus I of Saxony, resulted in the extensive rearrangement of the Ernestine duchies. Most of Saxe-Hildburghausen and Saalfeld were given to Saxe-Meiningen along with a few various cities. The Duchy of Saxe-Gotha was left without the Districts of Kranichfeld and Römhild, which fell to Saxe-Meiningen, and without the domain of Altenburg (Districts of Altenburg, Ronneburg, Eisenberg, Roda and Kahla), which turned the Duchy of Saxe-Hildburghausen into the Duchy of Saxe-Altenburg. But Saxe-Coburg gained from Saxe-Hildburghausen the two Districts – Königsberg and Sonnefeld.

The new duchy of Saxe-Coburg and Gotha was born as a personal union of the two duchies of Saxe-Coburg and Saxe-Gotha. Ernest III, the last Duke of Saxe-Coburg-Saalfeld, then became Ernest I, the first Duke of Saxe-Coburg and Gotha.

== Dukes of Saxe-Coburg-Saalfeld ==
- 1680–1729 Johann Ernest IV, son of Ernst I, Duke of Saxe-Gotha-Altenburg
- 1729–1745 Christian Ernest II, son of the previous Duke (reigned with his brother Francis Josias with the residence in Saalfeld)
- 1745–1764 Francis Josias, brother of the previous Duke (reigned until 1745, together with his brother Christian Ernest with the residence in Coburg)
- 1764–1800 Ernest Frederick, son of the previous Duke
- 1800–1806 Francis Frederick, son of the previous Duke
- 1806–1826 Ernest III, son of the previous Duke (since 1826, Ernest I, Duke of Saxe-Coburg and Gotha, died 1844)

== Prime Ministers of Saxe-Coburg-Saalfeld ==
- 1801–1808 Theodor Konrad von Kretschmann
- 1808–1822 Johann Ernst Gruner
- 1823–1824 Ludwig Hofmann
- 1824–1840 Christoph Anton Friedrich von Carlowiz (until 21 January 1840)

== See also ==
- Ernestine duchies
- Saxe-Coburg and Gotha

== Bibliography ==
- (in German) Carl-Christian Dressel, Die Entwicklung von Verfassung und Verwaltung in Sachsen-Coburg 1800 - 1826 im Vergleich [The Development and Comparison of the Constitution and Administration of Saxe-Coburg 1880 – 1826] (Berlin: Duncker & Humblot, 2007), ISBN 978-3-428-12003-1.
- (in German) Johann Hübner, Drey hundert drey und dreyßig Genealogische Tabellen: nebst denen darzu gehörigen genealogischen Fragen zur Erläuterung der politischen Historie, mit sonderbahrem Fleiße zusammen getragen, und vom Anfange der Welt biß auff diesen Tag continuiret; Nebst darzu dienlichen Registern [Three Hundred and Thirty Three Genealogical Tables: Together with those Related Questions of Genealogy to Explain the Political History, Compiled with Great Diligence, and Continuing from the Beginning of the World to This Day; Added Herein with Relevant Records] (Leipzig: Johann Friedrich Gleditsch, 1708) Table No. 166
