= Christian Ernest II of Saxe-Coburg-Saalfeld =

Christian Ernest II
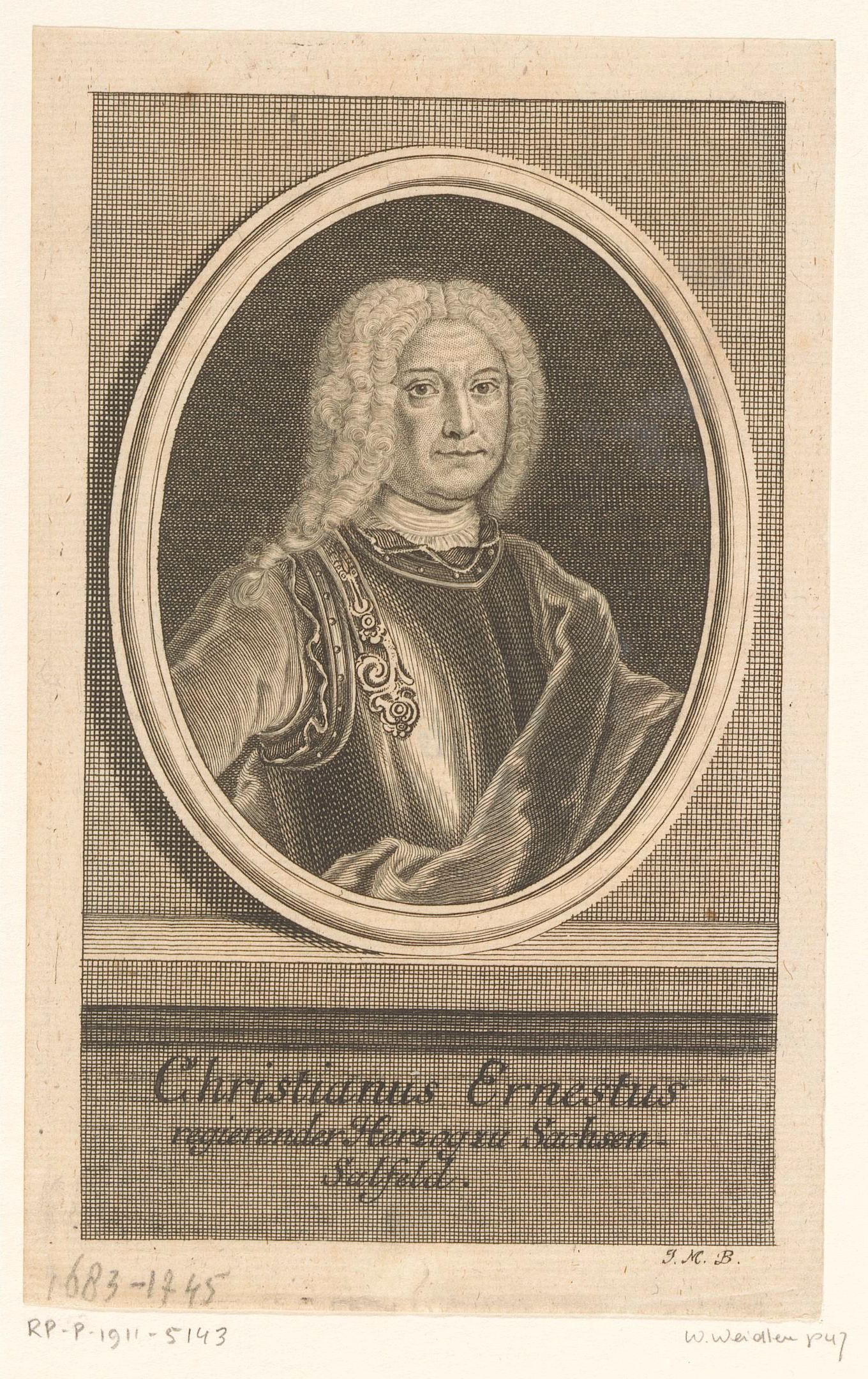

Duke of Saxe-Coburg-Saalfeld
- Reign: 17 February 1729 – 4 September 1745
- Predecessor: John Ernest IV
- Successor: Francis Josias
- Born: 18 August 1683; Saalfeld
- Died: 4 September 1745 (aged 62); Saalfeld
- Spouse: Christiane Fredericka of Koss
- House: Saxe-Coburg-Saalfeld
- Father: John Ernest IV, Duke of Saxe-Coburg-Saalfeld
- Mother: Sophie Hedwig of Saxe-Merseburg
- Religion: Lutheranism

Christian Ernest II, Duke of Saxe-Coburg-Saalfeld (German: Christian Ernst; 18 August 1683 – 4 September 1745), was a duke of Saxe-Coburg-Saalfeld.

== Life ==
He was the oldest surviving son of Johann Ernst, Duke of Saxe-Coburg-Saalfeld and his first wife, Sophie Hedwig of Saxe-Merseburg.

In Naitschau on 18 August 1724, Christian Ernst married unequally with Christiane Fredericka of Koss; for this, his younger half-brother Franz Josias reclaimed the full succession of the duchy. His father, the duke Johann Ernst, determined the common government of the brothers with indivisibility of the duchy upon his death, in 1729. Christian Ernst made his residence in Saalfeld and Franz Josias moved into the Veste Coburg.

The double government soon proved impossible, and this forced the settlement of the "Coburg Eisenberg Roemhilder of Hereditary Controversy", whereby Christian Ernst received Coburg, Rodach, Mönchröden and half Neuhaus. Christian Ernst died childless and all his inheritance was taken by his half-brother, Franz Josias.

== Ancestors ==
Ancestors of Christian Ernest II of Saxe-Coburg-Saalfeld

8. John II, Duke of Saxe-Weimar
4. Ernst I, Duke of Saxe-Gotha and Altenburg
9. Dorothea Maria of Anhalt
2. John Ernest IV, Duke of Saxe-Coburg-Saalfeld
10. John Philip, Duke of Saxe-Altenburg
5. Elisabeth Sophie of Saxe-Altenburg
11. Elisabeth of Brünswick-Wolfenbüttel
1. Christian Ernest II, Duke of Saxe-Coburg-Saalfeldh
12. John George I, Elector of Saxony
6. Christian I, Duke of Saxe-Merseburg
13. Magdalene Sibylle of Prussia
3. Sophia Hedwig of Saxe-Merseburg
14. Philip, Duke of Schleswig-Holstein-Sonderburg-Glücksburg
7. Christiane of Schleswig-Holstein-Glücksburg
15. Sophie Hedwig of Saxe-Lauenburg

Christian Ernest II of Saxe-Coburg-Saalfeld House of Wettin Born: 18 August 1683 Died: 4 September 1745
Regnal titles
Preceded by John Ernest IV	Duke of Saxe-Coburg-Saalfeld; 1729–1745	Succeeded by Francis Josias
