= Saxe-Gotha-Altenburg =

Thuringian duchy (1680–1826)

Duchy of Saxe-Gotha-Altenburg Herzogtum Sachsen-Gotha-Altenburg (German)
- 1672–1826
- Flag Coat of arms

- Territories of Saxe-Gotha-Altenburg within the Ernestine duchies of Thuringia, before 1826
- Status: State of the Holy Roman Empire, State of the Confederation of the Rhine, State of the German Confederation
- Capital: Gotha
- Government: Duchy
- Duke
  - 1680–1691: Frederick I (first)
  - 1822–1825: Frederick IV (last)
- Historical era: Early modern Europe
  - Union of Saxe-Gotha and Saxe-Altenburg: 1672
  - Duchy established: 1672
  - Partitioned between Saxe-Coburg-Saalfeld and Saxe-Hildburghausen: 1826

Area
- 1800: 3,007 km^{2} (1,161 sq mi)

Population
  - 1800: 187,000
Preceded by
Saxe-Gotha
Saxe-Altenburg
Succeeded by
Saxe-Coburg and Gotha
Saxe-Hildburghausen
Saxe-Altenburg

Saxe-Gotha-Altenburg (German: Sachsen-Gotha-Altenburg) was a duchy ruled by the Ernestine branch of the House of Wettin in today's Thuringia, Germany. The extinction of the line in 1825 led to a major re-organisation of the Thuringian states.

== History ==
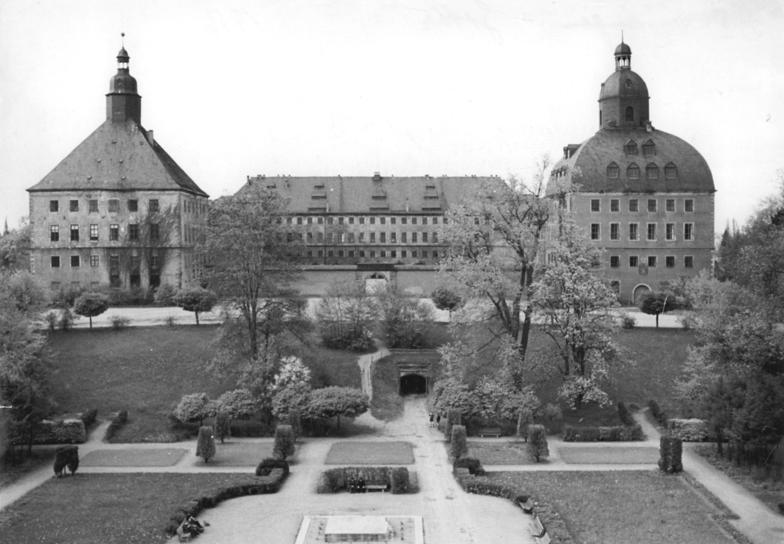
Friedenstein Castle, Gotha

In 1640 the sons of the late Ernestine duke John II of Saxe-Weimar divided their paternal heritage (Ernestinische Teilung) whereby Duke Ernest the Pious, a younger son, received the newly established Duchy of Saxe-Gotha. In 1636 Ernest had married Elisabeth Sophie, the only child of Duke John Philip of Saxe-Altenburg. Upon her father's death in 1639, the Duchy of Saxe-Altenburg passed to her uncle Duke Frederick William II and her cousin Frederick William III.

The Duchy of Saxe-Gotha-Altenburg was nominally created in 1672, when Duke Frederick William III of Saxe-Altenburg died at the age of 14 and Ernest the Pious, by his marriage with Elisabeth Sophie, inherited the major part of his possessions. It was common for the Ernestine duchies to merge and split; Ernest's combined duchy was divided again after his death in 1675, and the Duchy of Saxe-Gotha-Altenburg proper came into existence in 1680 with the completion of this division and the accession of his eldest son, Frederick to the subdivision centered on the towns of Gotha and Altenburg.

Frederick had already served as regent in Saxe-Altenburg since 1672 and assumed responsibility for government affairs from his diseased father two years later. His residence remained at Friedenstein Castle in Gotha, he also had the Baroque palace of Friedrichswerth built nearby. Frederick I decisively secured his family's possessions with the implementation of the primogeniture in 1685. His son and successor Duke Frederick II gained further Ernestine territories upon the death of Duke Albert V of Saxe-Coburg in 1699 and Duke Christian of Saxe-Eisenberg in 1707.

Saxe-Gotha-Altenburg remained one of the mightiest Ernestine duchies under the rule of Duke Frederick III from 1732. He had the palaces and gardens in Gotha rebuilt in a lavish Baroque style and supported the religious refugees of the Moravian Church in Neudietendorf. His sister Augusta married Prince Frederick of Wales in 1736, their first-born son George III was crowned King of Great Britain and Ireland in 1760. Frederick made his court a centre of the Enlightenment (Aufklärung), continued by his son and successor Ernest II, who ruled from 1772. At the instigation of Johann Wolfgang von Goethe, he promoted the painting oeuvre of Johann Heinrich Wilhelm Tischbein; he also appointed Franz Xaver von Zach director of the Gotha Observatory established in 1787.

Nevertheless, when the last dukes Emil August, a fervent admirer of the rise of Napoleon, and his brother Frederick IV had both died without male heirs, the house of Saxe-Gotha-Altenburg finally became extinct in 1825 and quarrels arose between the three remaining Ernestine lines about the succession. As a result of an arbitration issued by King Frederick Augustus I of Saxony in 1826, the Ernestine duchies were rearranged and Saxe-Gotha-Altenburg was again split:

- Saxe-Gotha passed to the Duchy of Saxe-Coburg-Saalfeld, which had to cede Saxe-Saalfeld to Saxe-Meiningen. The territories constituted the newly created Duchy of Saxe-Coburg and Gotha.
- Saxe-Altenburg was given to the Duke of Saxe-Hildburghausen, who in turn passed his own domain to Saxe-Meiningen and again assumed the title of a Duke of Saxe-Altenburg.

After the abolition of German monarchies in the course of the German Revolution of 1918–1919, all former duchies became part of the newly created state of Thuringia in 1920.

== Dukes of Saxe-Gotha-Altenburg ==
- Ernest I the Pious (1640–1675), inherited Saxe-Altenburg in 1675
- Frederick I (1675–1691), son of previous; first to bear the title Duke of Saxe-Gotha-Altenburg
- Frederick II (1691–1732), son
- Frederick III (1732–1772), son
- Ernest II (1772–1804), son
- Emil August (1804–1822), son
- Frederick IV (1822–1825), brother, line extinct

== See also ==
- Ernestine duchies
