= John Ernest IV =

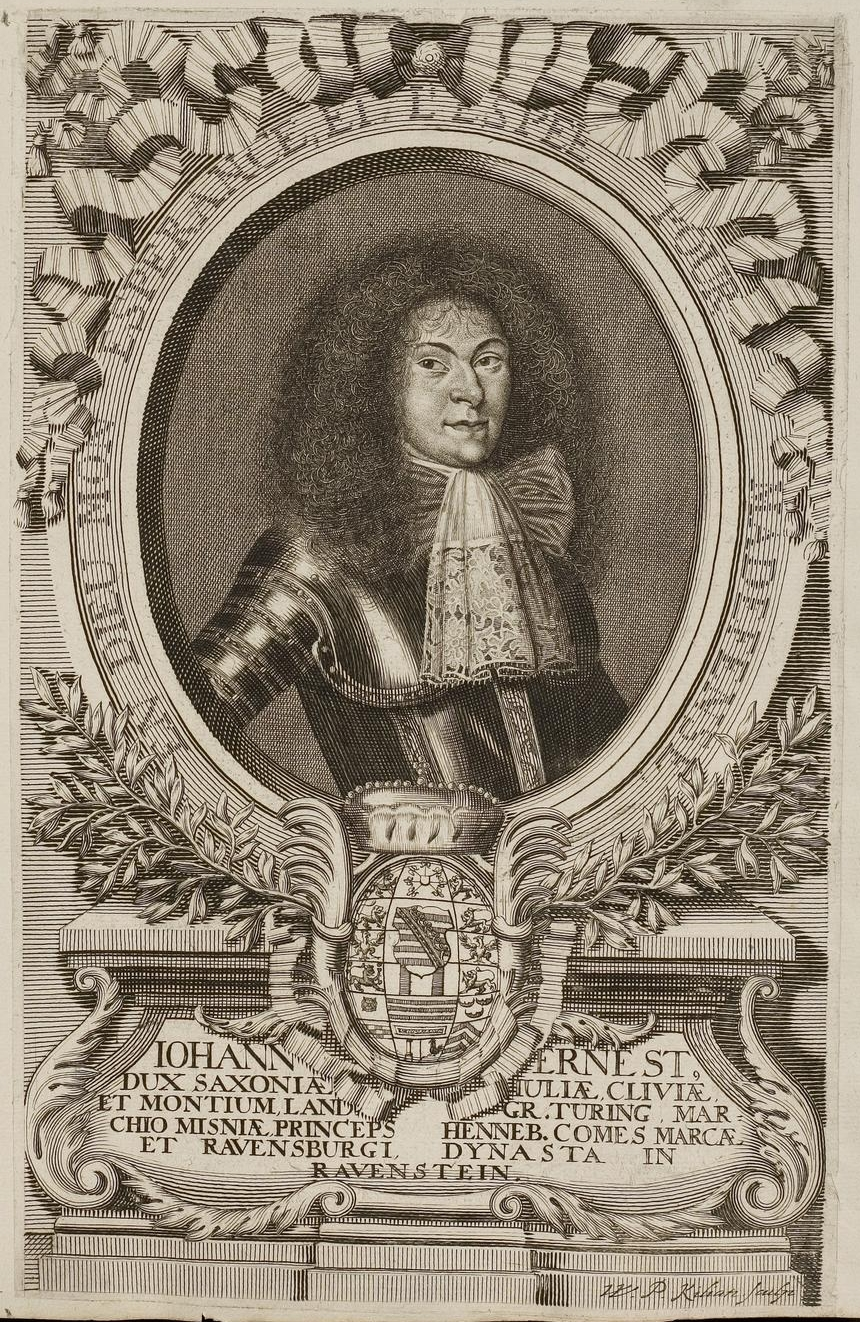

Duke of Saxe-Coburg-Saalfeld
- Reign: 6 August 1699 – 17 February 1729
- Predecessor: Albert V
- Successor: Christian Ernest

Duke of Saxe-Saalfeld
- Reign: 26 March 1675 – 6 August 1699
- Predecessor: New creation
- Successor: Title merged into Saxe-Coburg-Saalfeld
- Born: 22 August 1658; Gotha, Saxe-Gotha, Holy Roman Empire
- Died: 17 February 1729 (aged 70); Saalfeld, Saxe-Coburg-Saalfeld, Holy Roman Empire
- Spouse: Sophie Hedwig of Saxe-Merseburg (m. 1680; died 1686) Charlotte Johanna of Waldeck-Wildungen (m. 1690; died 1699)
- Issue: Christiane Sophie; Christian Ernest II, Duke of Saxe-Coburg-Saalfeld; Charlotte, Countess of Hanau-Münzenberg; Wilhelm Frederick; Karl Ernst; Sophia, Princess of Schwarzburg-Rudolstadt; Princess Louise Emilie; Francis Josias, Duke of Saxe-Coburg-Saalfeld; Henriette Albertine
- House: Wettin (Ernestine line) (by birth); Saxe-Coburg-Saalfeld (founder)
- Father: Ernest I, Duke of Saxe-Gotha
- Mother: Elisabeth Sophie of Saxe-Altenburg
- Religion: Lutheran

John Ernest IV (German: Johann Ernst; 22 August 1658–17 February 1729) was Duke of Saxe-Saalfeld from 1680 to 1729 and the founder of the House of Saxe-Coburg-Saalfeld.

== Life ==
He was the tenth but seventh surviving son of Ernest I, Duke of Saxe-Gotha and Elisabeth Sophie of Saxe-Altenburg, both members of the Ernestine line of the House of Wettin.

After the death of his father in 1675, Johann Ernest initially governed the duchy of Saxe-Gotha-Altenburg, jointly with his six older brothers, as set out in their father's will. However, in 1680, the brothers concluded a treaty dividing the paternal lands and Johann Ernest became duke of Saxe-Saalfeld, with the towns of Gräfenthal, Probstzella and Pössneck. As he was the youngest, he kept the smallest portion of the lands. Johann Ernest and his brother Ernest soon found themselves financially overstretched as a result of the partition (the income of their eldest brother, Frederick, far exceeded the income of Johann Ernest), and they both made a protest. Over the following years, the controversy continued and increased, as their older brothers Albert of Saxe-Coburg, Henry of Saxe-Römhild and Christian of Saxe-Eisenberg died without male heirs. During these years, Johann Ernest took possession of Coburg (in 1699), Römhild and 5/12 of Themar (in 1714).

The "Coburg-Eisenberg-Römhilder Erbstreit" was finally resolved (after repeated intervention and arbitration by the emperor) in 1735, six years after the death of Johann Ernest. His descendants retained Coburg. The decision was generally accepted, most importantly by the descendants of his older brother Bernhard, who also had a claim to Coburg.

== Issue ==
In Merseburg on 18 February 1680, Johann Ernst married firstly Sophie Hedwig of Saxe-Merseburg, a daughter of Christian I, Duke of Saxe-Merseburg. They had five children:

1. Christiane Sophie (b. Saalfeld, 14 June 1681 – d. Saalfeld, 3 June 1697) died aged 15, unmarried.
2. Stillborn daughter (Saalfeld, 6 May 1682).
3. Christian Ernst, Duke of Saxe-Coburg-Saalfeld (b. Saalfeld, 18 August 1683 – d. Saalfeld, 4 September 1745).
4. Charlotte Wilhelmine (b. Saalfeld, 4 May 1685 – d. Hanau, 5 April 1767), married on 26 December 1705 to Philip Reinhard, Count of Hanau-Münzenberg.
5. Stillborn son (Saalfeld, 2 August 1686).

In Maastricht on 2 December 1690 Johann Ernst married secondly Charlotte Johanna of Waldeck-Wildungen (b. Arolsen, 13 December 1664, d. Hildburghausen, 1 February 1699). They had eight children:

1. Wilhelm Frederick (b. Arolsen, 16 August 1691 – d. Saalfeld, 28 July 1720) died unmarried and without issue.
2. Karl Ernst (b. Saalfeld, 12 September 1692 – d. Cremona, 30 December 1720) died unmarried and without issue.
3. Sophia Wilhelmina (b. Saalfeld, 9 August 1693 – d. Rudolstadt, 4 December 1727), married on 8 February 1720 to Frederick Anton, Prince of Schwarzburg-Rudolstadt.
4. Henriette Albertine (b. Saalfeld, 8 July 1694 – d. Saalfeld, 1 April 1695) died in infancy.
5. Louise Emilie (b. Saalfeld, 24 August 1695 – d. Coburg, 21 August 1713) died unmarried and without issue.
6. Charlotte (b. Saalfeld, 30 October 1696 – d. Saalfeld, 2 November 1696) died in infancy.
7. Francis Josias, Duke of Saxe-Coburg-Saalfeld (b. Saalfeld, 25 September 1697 – d. Rodach, 16 September 1764).
8. Henriette Albertine (b. Saalfeld, 20 November 1698 – d. Coburg, 5 February 1728) died unmarried without issue.

== Ancestry ==
Ancestors of John Ernest IV

8. Johann Wilhelm, Duke of Saxe-Weimar
4. Johann II, Duke of Saxe-Weimar
9. Dorothea Susanne of Simmern
2. Ernest I, Duke of Saxe-Gotha
10. Joachim Ernest, Prince of Anhalt
5. Dorothea Maria of Anhalt
11. Eleonore of Württemberg
1. Johann Ernest IV, Duke of Saxe-Coburg-Saalfeld
12. Frederick Wilhelm I, Duke of Saxe-Weimar
6. Johann Philipp, Duke of Saxe-Altenburg
13. Anna Maria of the Palatinate-Neuburg
3. Elisabeth Sophie of Saxe-Altenburg
14. Henry Julius, Duke of Brunswick-Lüneburg
7. Elisabeth of Brünswick-Wolfenbüttel
15. Elizabeth of Denmark

John Ernest IV House of Wettin Born: 22 August 1658 Died: 17 February 1729
Preceded by New creation	Duke of Saxe-Saalfeld; 1675–1699	Succeeded by Title merged into Saxe-Coburg-Saalfeld
Preceded by Albert V	Duke of Saxe-Coburg-Saalfeld; 1699–1729	Succeeded by Christian Ernst
