= Saxe-Eisenberg =

Middle Age duchy in modern-day Germany

Duchy of Saxe-Eisenberg Herzogtum Sachsen-Eisenberg (German)
- 1680–1707
- Status: State of the Holy Roman Empire
- Capital: Eisenberg
- Government: Principality
- Historical era: Middle Ages
  - Partitioned from Saxe-Gotha: 1680
  - Extinction of line: 1707
| Preceded by | Succeeded by |
| Saxe-Gotha | Saxe-Hildburghausen |

The Duchy of Saxe-Eisenberg was one of the Saxon Duchies held by the Ernestine line of the House of Wettin.

== History ==
Established in 1680 for Christian, fifth son of Ernest I, Duke of Saxe-Gotha, the Duchy consisted of Eisenberg and the towns of Ronneburg, Roda and Camburg. Upon his death in April 1707, as he had no male heirs, the lands were passed to Saxe-Hildburghausen.

== Dukes of Saxe-Eisenberg ==
- Christian (1680–1707)
