= Ernest I of Saxe-Gotha =

Ernest I
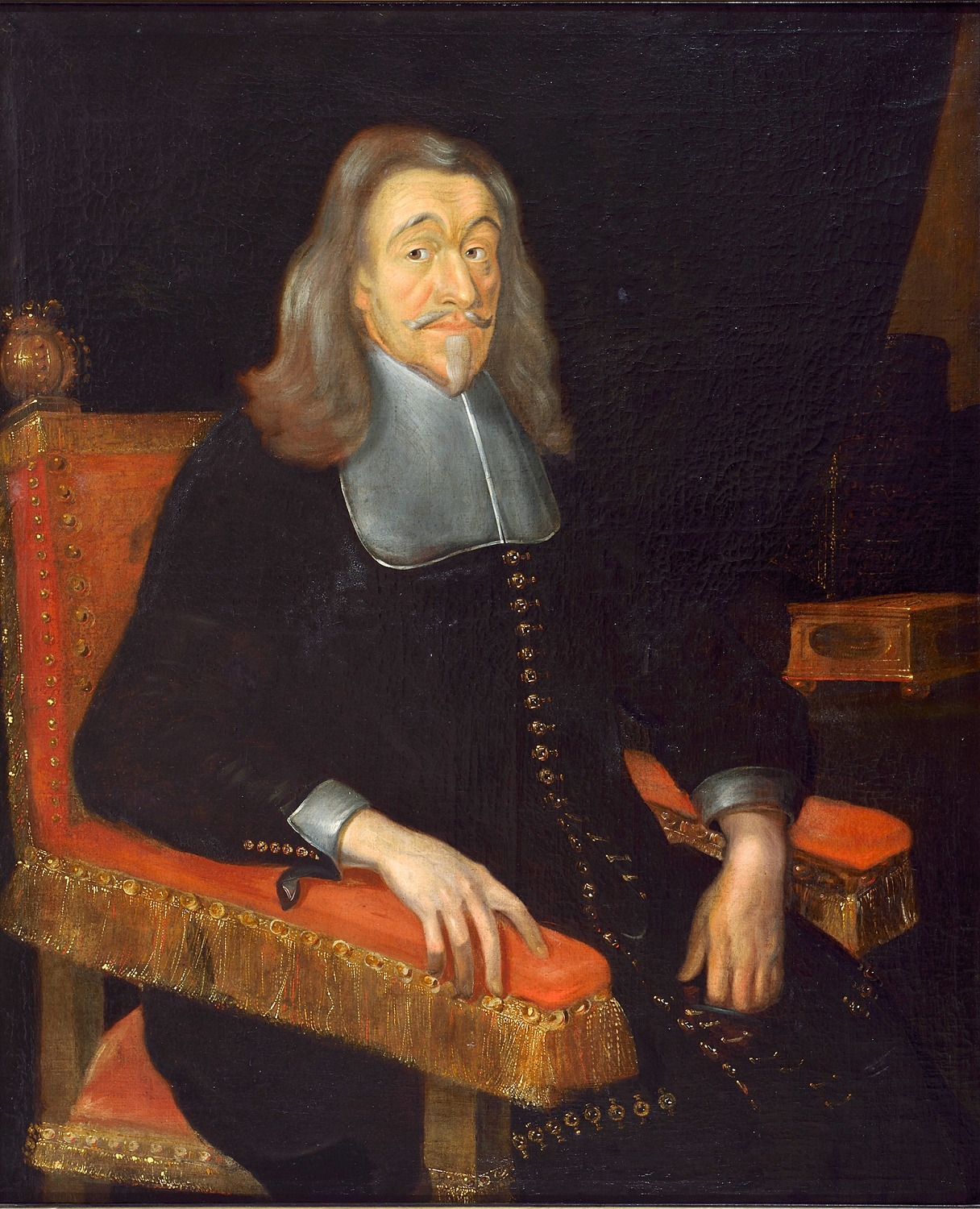

Duke of Saxe-Gotha and Altenburg
- Reign: 14 April 1672 – 26 March 1675
- Successors: Frederick in Saxe-Gotha-Altenburg; Albrecht in Saxe-Coburg; Bernhard in Saxe-Meiningen; Heinrich in Saxe-Römhild; Christian in Saxe-Eisenberg; Ernst in Saxe-Hildburghausen; Johann Ernst in Saxe-Saalfeld

Duke of Saxe-Gotha
- Reign: 26 February 1640 – 26 March 1675
- Predecessor: New creation

Duke of Saxe-Altenburg
- Reign: 14 April 1672 – 26 March 1675
- Predecessor: Friedrich Wilhelm III
- Born: 25 December 1601; Altenburg, Duchy of Saxe-Weimar, Holy Roman Empire
- Died: 26 March 1675 (aged 73); Schloss Friedenstein, Gotha, Holy Roman Empire
- Burial: St. Margarethenkirche, Gotha, Neumarkt
- Spouse: Elisabeth Sophie of Saxe-Altenburg (m. 1636)
- Issue Detail: Elisabeth Dorothea, Landgravine of Hesse-Darmstadt; Frederick I, Duke of Saxe-Gotha-Altenburg; Albert, Duke of Saxe-Coburg; Bernhard I, Duke of Saxe-Meiningen; Henry, Duke of Saxe-Römhild; Christian, Duke of Saxe-Eisenberg; Dorothea Maria; Ernest, Duke of Saxe-Hildburghausen; Johann Ernest IV, Duke of Saxe-Coburg-Saalfeld
- House: Wettin (Ernestine line) (by birth); Saxe-Gotha-Altenburg (founder)
- Father: Johann II, Duke of Saxe-Weimar
- Mother: Dorothea Maria of Anhalt
- Religion: Lutheran

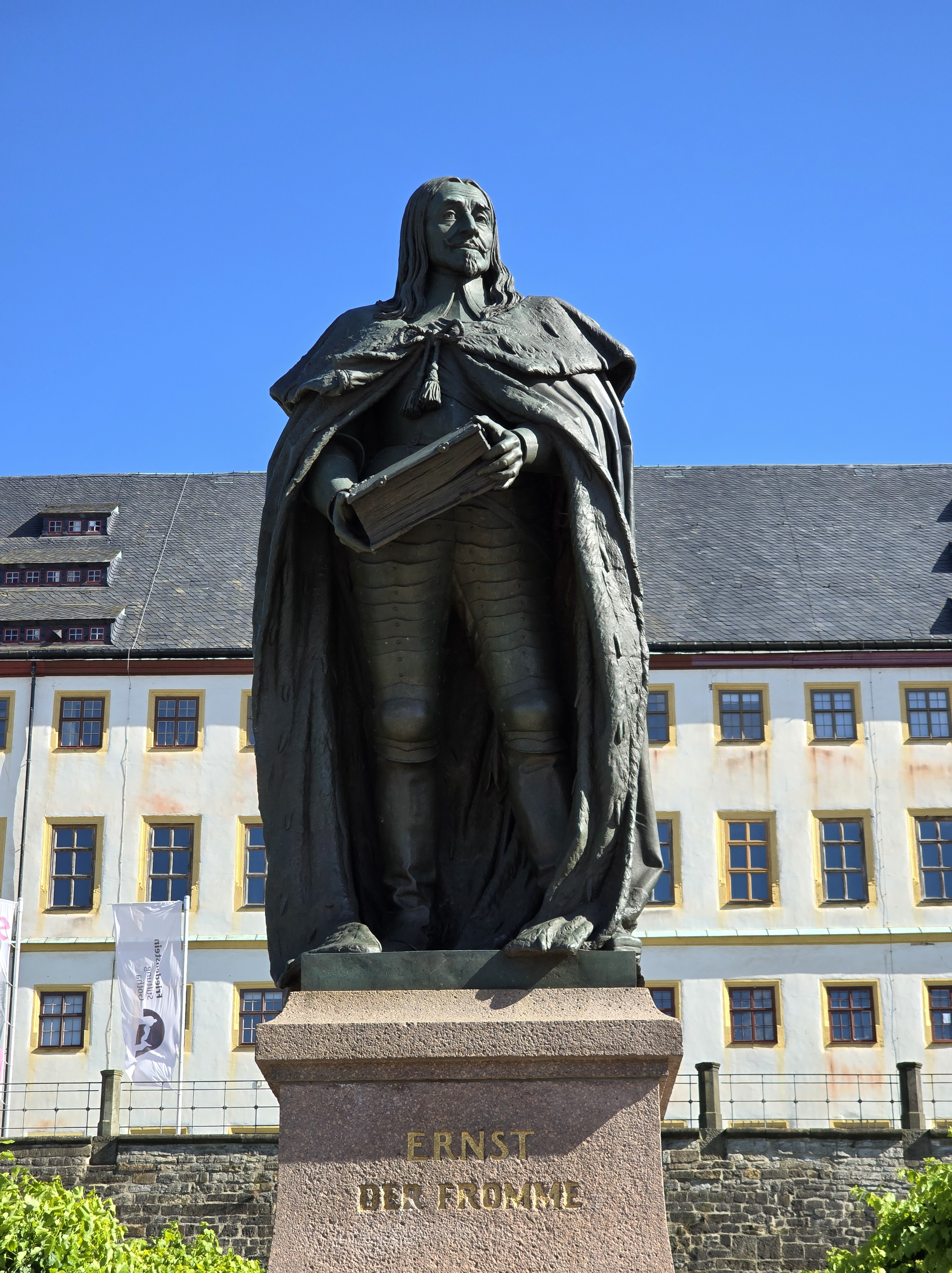
Statue of Ernest I in front of Friedenstein Castle in Gotha

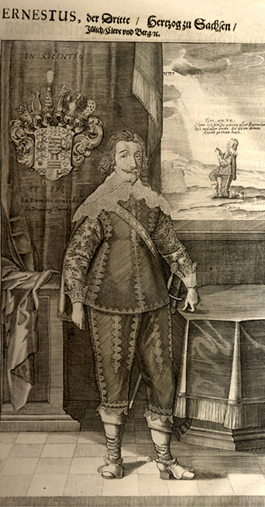
Engraving of Ernest I

Ernest I, widely known as Ernest the Pious (German: Ernst I., der Fromme; 25 December 1601 – 26 March 1675), was duke of Saxe-Gotha and Saxe-Altenburg, later united as Saxe-Gotha-Altenburg. He was a surviving son of Johann II, Duke of Saxe-Weimar and Dorothea Maria of Anhalt. He is remembered for rebuilding and reforming his lands after the Thirty Years' War. A devout Lutheran, he allied with Sweden in 1631 and fought at Lech, Nördlingen, Lützen, and the siege of Nuremberg; after the Peace of Prague (1635) he withdrew from warfare to focus on administration and recovery.

With Veit Ludwig von Seckendorf and Andreas Reyher, he led major educational reforms through the Schulmethodus (1642), promoting compulsory and graded schooling with a broader curriculum. He also founded the ducal library at Gotha and patronized early currents of the German Enlightenment.

In 1675 he was interred as the first member of the House of Saxe-Gotha-Altenburg in the crypt beneath the chancel of St. Margarethenkirche on the Neumarkt. More than half a century later, during the church's remodeling in 1728, an epitaph for him and his wife was installed, and it still survives on the north wall.

== Life ==
Left an orphan early in life (his father died in 1605 and his mother in 1617), he was brought up in a strict manner and was gifted and precocious but not physically strong. He soon showed traits of the piety of the time. As ruler, by his character and governmental ability as well as by personal attention to matters of state, he introduced a golden age for his subjects after the ravages of the Thirty Years' War. By wise economy, which did not exclude fitting generosity or display on proper occasions, he freed his land from debt, left at his death a considerable sum in the treasury, and reduced taxation. Public security and an incorruptible and efficient judiciary received much of his attention, and his regulations served as models for other states.

He was an opponent of torture, banning it and also supported trials of witchcraft, though he was not inclined to superstition and was a foe of alchemy. He prohibited dueling and imposed the death penalty for a mortal result.

In 1640, according to the partition treaty with his brothers, Ernst received Gotha.

His laws were not conceived in the spirit of modern ideas about individual liberty; they forbade secret betrothals, tried to regulate dress, and extended even to the stable, kitchen, and cellar. Nevertheless, his regulations promoted agriculture, commerce, learning, and art. His palace of Friedenstein in Gotha was rebuilt, and its collections owe their origin to Ernest; the library became one of the largest in Germany. Churches were built and by his Schulmethodus of 1642, Ernest became the father of the present grammar school. It was a popular saying that his peasants were better instructed than the townsmen and nobles elsewhere, and at his death, it was said, that no one in his land was unable to read and write. He made the gymnasium in Gotha a model school which attracted pupils not only from all German lands, but from Sweden, Russia, Poland, and Hungary. In like manner, he fostered the University of Jena, increasing its funds and regulating its studies, with too much emphasis on the religious side. His promotion of Jesus Christ church affairs won him the nickname of "Praying Ernest", but an excuse is found in the fearful demoralization caused by the war. The Bible was his own everyday book and he strove unceasingly to make his people religious after a strict Lutheran pattern. Religious instruction, consisting in catechetical exercises without Bible history, was kept up even to advanced years and not unnaturally the rigid compulsion in some cases defeated its purpose. Ernest's system has maintained itself surprisingly; it still exists legally though somewhat modified or disregarded.

His efforts for Protestantism were not confined to his own land. He interceded with the Holy Roman emperor for his Austrian co-religionists and wanted to establish them in Gotha. He became a benefactor to the Evangelical Lutheran Church of the Germans in Moscow and entered into friendly relations with the Russian tsar. He even sent an embassy to introduce Lutheranism into Abyssinia, but this failed to accomplish its purpose. His rule of his family is a miniature of his government of his land; the strictest discipline prevailed at court. Its life was simple and industrious, regulated on all sides by religious exercises. Rules were added to rules. No detail was overlooked which could promote the spiritual and physical development of his children, and their religious education was carried to excess. Nevertheless, his children all turned out well and Ernest died with the name of "father and savior of his people." Oliver Cromwell counted him among the most sagacious of princes; in him was embodied "the idea of the Protestant patriarchal prince and of a Christian governor of State and Church truly caring for both."

== Family and children ==
In Altenburg on 24 October 1636, Ernst married his younger cousin Elisabeth Sophie of Saxe-Altenburg. As a result of this marriage, Saxe-Gotha and Saxe-Altenburg were unified when the last duke of the line (Elisabeth's cousin) died childless in 1672. Ernst and Elisabeth Sophie had 18 children of which only nine survived into mature adulthood:

1. Johann Ernest (b. Weimar, 18 September 1638 – d. Weimar, 27 November 1638), died in infancy.
2. Elisabeth Dorothea (b. Coburg, 8 January 1640 – d. Butzbach, 24 August 1709), married on 5 December 1666 to Louis VI, Landgrave of Hesse-Darmstadt.
3. Johann Ernest (b. Gotha, 16 May 1641 – d. of smallpox, Gotha, 31 December 1657), died at age 16, unmarried.
4. Christian (b. and d. Gotha, 23 February 1642), died the day of birth.
5. Sophie (b. Gotha, 21 February 1643 – d. of smallpox, Gotha, 14 December 1657), died at age 14, unmarried.
6. Johanna (b. Gotha, 14 February 1645 – d. [of smallpox?] Gotha, 7 December 1657), died at age 12, unmarried.
7. Frederick I, Duke of Saxe-Gotha-Altenburg (b. Gotha, 15 July 1646 – d. Friedrichswerth, 2 August 1691)
8. Albert, Duke of Saxe-Coburg (b. Gotha, 24 May 1648 – d. Coburg, 6 August 1699).
9. Bernhard I, Duke of Saxe-Meiningen (b. Gotha, 10 September 1649 – d. Meiningen, 27 April 1706).
10. Henry, Duke of Saxe-Römhild (b. Gotha, 19 November 1650 – d. Römhild, 13 May 1710).
11. Christian, Duke of Saxe-Eisenberg (b. Gotha, 6 January 1653 – d. Eisenberg, 28 April 1707).
12. Dorothea Maria (b. Gotha, 12 February 1654 – d. Gotha, 17 June 1682).
13. Ernest, Duke of Saxe-Hildburghausen (b. Gotha, 12 June 1655 – d. Hildburghausen, 17 October 1715).
14. Johann Philip (b. Gotha, 1 March 1657 – d. Gotha, 19 May 1657), died in infancy.
15. Johann Ernest IV, Duke of Saxe-Coburg-Saalfeld (b. Gotha, 22 August 1658 – d. Saalfeld, 17 February 1729).
16. Johanna Elisabeth (b. Gotha, 2 September 1660 – d. Gotha, 18 December 1660), died in infancy.
17. Johann Philip (b. Gotha, 16 November 1661 – d. Gotha, 13 March 1662), died in infancy.
18. Sophie Elisabeth (b. Gotha, 19 May 1663 – d. Gotha, 23 May 1663), died in infancy.

Their eldest son Frederick was the first to inherit this title. His granddaughter from this son, Anna Sophie of Saxe-Gotha-Altenburg, was a direct matrilineal ancestor of Nicholas II of Russia. His younger son Johann Ernest was the father of Franz Josias, Duke of Saxe-Coburg-Saalfeld.

== Sources ==
- Hanham, Andrew (2004). "Caroline of Brandenburg-Ansbach and the 'anglicisation' of the House of Hanover". In Orr, Clarissa Campbell (ed.). Queenship in Europe 1660-1815: The Role of the Consort. pp. 276–299. ISBN 9780521814225.
- Wilhelm Hertzberg (1877). "Ernest I.". Allgemeine Deutsche Biographie (in German). Vol. 6. Leipzig: Duncker & Humblot. p. 304.
- "Ernest I, duke of Saxe-Gotha-Altenburg". Encyclopædia Britannica.

Ernest I of Saxe-Gotha House of Wettin
Preceded by Frederick Wilhelm III	Duke of Saxe-Altenburg; 1672–1675	Succeeded by Frederick of Saxe-Gotha-Altenburg Albrecht of Saxe-Coburg; Bernhard of Saxe-Meiningen; Heinrich of Saxe-Römhild; Christian of Saxe-Eisenberg; Ernst of Saxe-Hildburghausen Johann Ernst of Saxe-Coburg-Saalfeld
Preceded by new creation	Duke of Saxe-Gotha; 1640–1675	Succeeded by Frederick of Saxe-Gotha-Altenburg Albrecht of Saxe-Coburg; Bernhard of Saxe-Meiningen; Heinrich of Saxe-Römhild; Christian of Saxe-Eisenberg; Ernst of Saxe-Hildburghausen Johann Ernst of Saxe-Coburg-Saalfeld
