= Saxe-Saalfeld =

European polity

Duchy of Saxe-Saalfeld Herzogtum Sachsen-Saalfeld (German)
- 1680–1735
- Coat of arms of Saxony

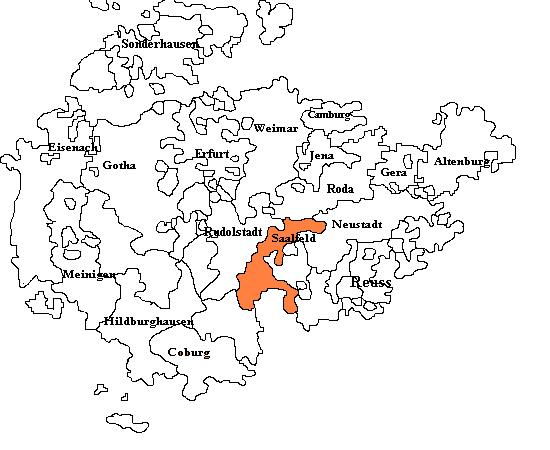
- Saxe-Saafeld, shown within the other Ernestine duchies
- Status: State of the Holy Roman Empire
- Capital: Saalfeld
- Government: Principality
- Historical era: Middle Ages
  - Partitioned from Saxe-Gotha: 1680
  - United with Coburg: August 6, 1699
  - Duchy renamed onImperial decision ofErnestine succession: 1735
Preceded by	Succeeded by
Saxe-Gotha	Saxe-Coburg-Saalfeld

The Duchy of Saxe-Saalfeld was one of the Saxon Duchies held by the Ernestine line of the Wettin Dynasty. Established in 1680 for Johann Ernst, seventh son of Ernest I, Duke of Saxe-Gotha. It remained under this name until 1699, when Albert, Duke of Saxe-Coburg died without sons. His brother Johann Ernst of Saxe-Saalfeld became the new Duke of Coburg and the duchy was renamed into Saxe-Coburg-Saalfeld in 1735.

== Dukes of Saxe-Saalfeld ==
- Johann Ernst (1675–1729)
- Christian Ernst (1729–1745)

Renamed Saxe-Coburg-Saalfeld
