= Albert V of Saxe-Coburg =

Duke of Saxe-Coburg (1648–1699)

Albert V
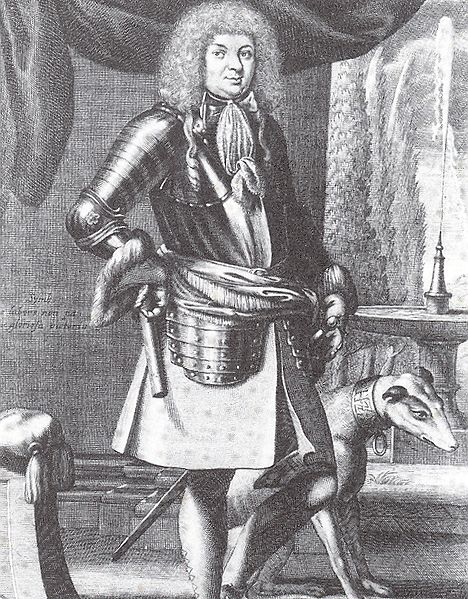
- 17th-century engraving

Duke of Saxe-Coburg
- Reign: 1675–1699
- Predecessor: New creation
- Successor: John Ernest IV
- Born: 24 May 1648; Gotha
- Died: 6 August 1699 (aged 51); Coburg
- Spouse: Marie Elisabeth of Brunswick-Wolfenbüttel; Susanne Elisabeth Kempinsky
- Issue: Ernest August
- House: House of Wettin
- Father: Ernst I, Duke of Saxe-Coburg-Altenburg
- Mother: Elisabeth Sophie of Saxe-Altenburg
- Religion: Lutheran

Albert V (24 May 1648 – 6 August 1699) was a duke of Saxe-Coburg.

He was the fifth but second surviving son of Ernst I, Duke of Saxe-Coburg-Altenburg, and Elisabeth Sophie of Saxe-Altenburg. He was born in Gotha. With his brother Bernhard, he attended the University of Tübingen from 1666, and later continued his studies in Geneva. He went on his Grand Tour with his brother Heinrich to Denmark, Sweden and the Netherlands.

When his father died in 1675, Albert became ruler of the duchy of Saxe-Gotha-Altenburg along with all his brothers, and took Saalfeld as his residence. In 1680, after concluding a treaty of partition with his brothers, he received Coburg, to which he moved his residence.

After his death without surviving sons in Coburg, his lands were disputed between his brothers, but Coburg was finally inherited by his youngest surviving brother, John Ernst.

== Family ==
Albrecht married firstly in Gotha on 18 July 1676 Marie Elisabeth of Brunswick-Wolfenbüttel, Dowager Duchess of Saxe-Weimar. They had one son:

1. Ernest August (b. Saalfeld, 1 September 1677 – d. Saalfeld, 17 August 1678) died in childhood.

Secondly, Albrecht married in Coburg, on 24 May 1688 Susanne Elisabeth Kempinsky; in 1689, she was created Countess Kempinsky of Schwisitz and Altenhofen. They had no children.

== Ancestors ==
8. Johann Wilhelm, Duke of Saxe-Weimar
4. John II, Duke of Saxe-Weimar
9. Dorothea Susanne of Simmern
2. Ernest I, Duke of Saxe-Gotha
10. Joachim Ernst of Anhalt
5. Dorothea Maria of Anhalt
11. Eleonore of Württemberg
1. Albert V, Duke of Saxe-Coburg
12. Frederick Wilhelm I, Duke of Saxe-Weimar
6. Johann Philipp, Duke of Saxe-Altenburg
13. Anna Maria of the Palatinate-Neuburg
3. Princess Elisabeth Sophie of Saxe-Altenburg
14. Henry Julius, Duke of Brunswick-Lüneburg
7. Elizabeth of Brunswick-Wolfenbüttel
15. Elizabeth of Denmark

Albert V of Saxe-Coburg House of Wettin (Ernestine branch) Born: 24 May 1648 Died: 6 August 1699
Preceded by Ernst of Saxe-Gotha	Duke of Saxe-Coburg; 1675–1699	Succeeded by Johann Ernst of Saxe-Coburg-Saafeld
