= 1657 =

1657 in various calendars
- Gregorian calendar: 1657; MDCLVII
- Ab urbe condita: 2410
- Armenian calendar: 1106; ԹՎ ՌՃԶ
- Assyrian calendar: 6407
- Balinese saka calendar: 1578–1579
- Bengali calendar: 1063–1064
- Berber calendar: 2607
- English Regnal year: 8 Cha. 2 – 9 Cha. 2 (Interregnum)
- Buddhist calendar: 2201
- Burmese calendar: 1019
- Byzantine calendar: 7165–7166
- Chinese calendar: 丙申年 (Fire Monkey); 4354 or 4147 — to — 丁酉年 (Fire Rooster); 4355 or 4148
- Coptic calendar: 1373–1374
- Discordian calendar: 2823
- Ethiopian calendar: 1649–1650
- Hebrew calendar: 5417–5418
- Hindu calendars
- Vikram Samvat: 1713–1714
- Shaka Samvat: 1578–1579
- Kali Yuga: 4757–4758
- Holocene calendar: 11657
- Igbo calendar: 657–658
- Iranian calendar: 1035–1036
- Islamic calendar: 1067–1068
- Japanese calendar: Meireki 3 (明暦３年)
- Javanese calendar: 1579–1580
- Julian calendar: Gregorian minus 10 days
- Korean calendar: 3990
- Minguo calendar: 255 before ROC 民前255年
- Nanakshahi calendar: 189
- Thai solar calendar: 2199–2200
- Tibetan calendar: མེ་ཕོ་སྤྲེ་ལོ་ (male Fire-Monkey); 1783 or 1402 or 630 — to — མེ་མོ་བྱ་ལོ་ (female Fire-Bird); 1784 or 1403 or 631

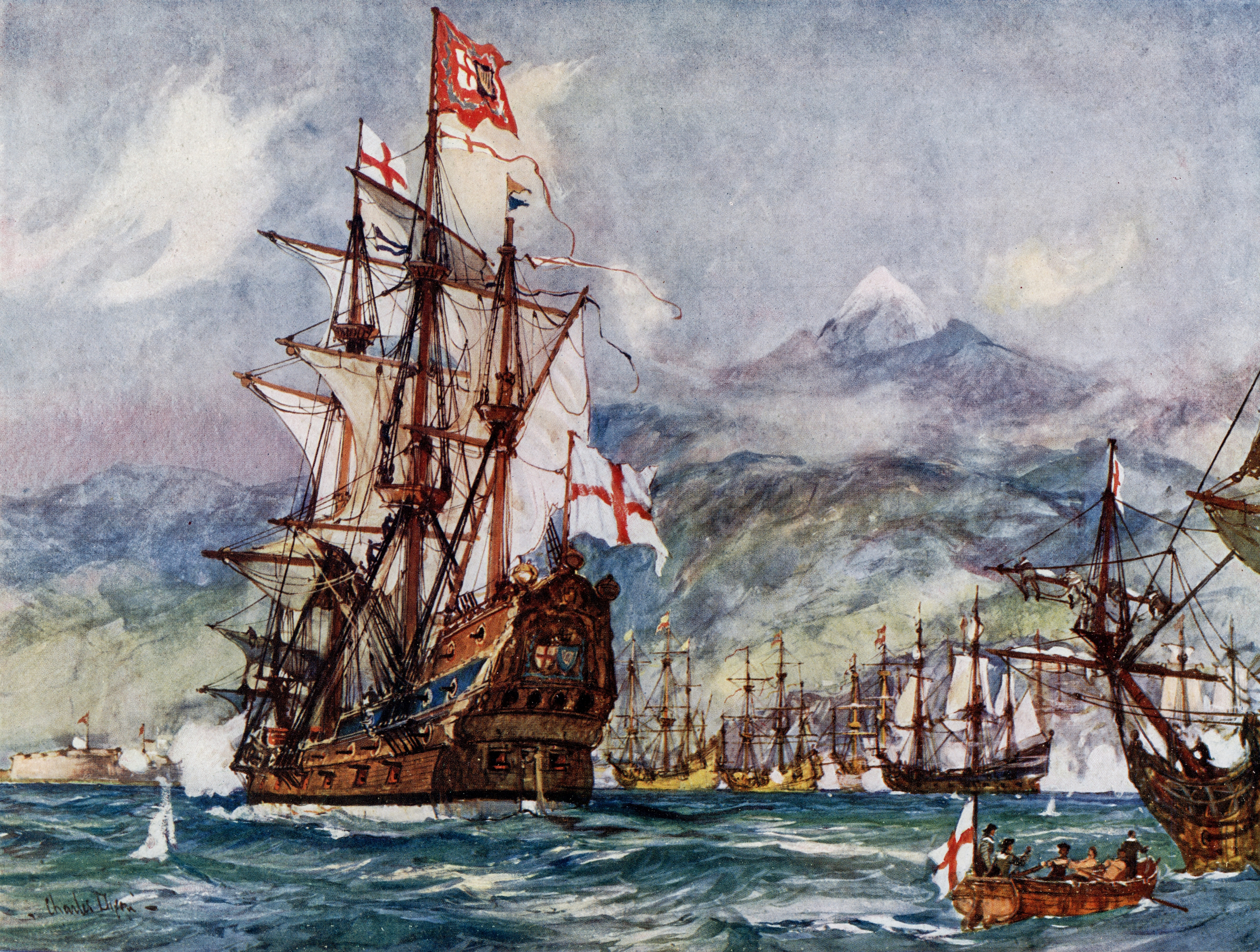
April 20: Battle of Santa Cruz de Tenerife

1657 (MDCLVII) was a common year starting on Monday of the Gregorian calendar and a common year starting on Thursday of the Julian calendar, the 1657th year of the Common Era (CE) and Anno Domini (AD) designations, the 657th year of the 2nd millennium, the 57th year of the 17th century, and the 8th year of the 1650s decade. As of the start of 1657, the Gregorian calendar was 10 days ahead of the Julian calendar, which remained in localized use until 1923.

== Events ==
=== January–March ===
- January 8 – Miles Sindercombe and his group of disaffected Levellers are betrayed in their attempt to assassinate Oliver Cromwell by blowing up the Palace of Whitehall in London and are arrested.
- January 29 – Rule of the Major-Generals (regional military government) in England is abolished.
- February 4 – Resettlement of the Jews in England: Oliver Cromwell gives Antonio Fernandez Carvajal the assurance of the right of Jews to remain in England.
- February 23 – In England, the Humble Petition and Advice offers Lord Protector Cromwell the crown.
- March 2 – The Great Fire of Meireki in Edo, Japan, destroys most of the city and damages Edo Castle, killing an estimated 100,000 people.
- March 23 – Anglo-Spanish War (1654–60): By the Treaty of Paris, France and England form an alliance against Spain; England will receive Dunkirk.

=== April–June ===
- April 20
  - Anglo-Spanish War – Battle of Santa Cruz de Tenerife: English Admiral Robert Blake attempts to seize a Spanish treasure fleet.
  - The Jews of New Amsterdam (later New York City) are granted freedom of religion, as full citizens.
- May 8 – Lord Protector Cromwell confirms his refusal of the crown of England, preferring the title "Lord Protector".
- June 1
  - King Frederick III of Denmark signs a manifesto, de facto declaring war on Sweden.
  - The first eleven Quaker settlers arrive in New Amsterdam (later New York City), and are allowed to practice their faith.

=== July–September ===
- July 13 – Following his refusal to take the oath of allegiance to Oliver Cromwell, English army leader John Lambert is ordered to resign his commissions.
- August 20 – The ship Les Armes d'Amsterdam arrives at Quebec, New France. Among the passengers is Michel Mathieu Brunet dit Lestang (1638–1708), colonist, explorer and co-discoverer of modern-day Green Bay, Wisconsin, and ancestor of the Brunet, Lestang and Carisse families of North America.
- September 19 – Brandenburg and Poland sign the Treaty of Wehlau.
- September 24 – The first autopsy and coroner's jury verdict in the Colony of Maryland are recorded.
- September – Shah Jahan becomes ill, allowing his son to take control of the Mughal Empire.

=== October–December ===
- October 1 – Treaty of Raalte: William III, Prince of Orange is no longer stadtholder of Overijssel.
- October 3 – French troops occupy Mardyck.
- November 6 – Brandenburg and Poland sign the Treaty of Bromberg.
- November 10 – Christina, former Queen regnant of Sweden, has Gian Rinaldo Monaldeschi killed in her presence, at the Palace of Fontainebleau.
- December 27 – The Flushing Remonstrance is signed in New Amsterdam, at the site of the future (1862) Flushing Town Hall in New York City.

=== Date unknown ===
- The Accademia del Cimento is founded in Florence, Italy.
- England's first chocolate house is opened in London and introduction of tea in England while coffee is introduced to France.
- Christiaan Huygens writes the first book to be published on probability theory, De ratiociniis in ludo aleae ("On Reasoning in Games of Chance").
- Andreas Gryphius' drama Katharina von Georgien is published in Breslau.
- Thomas Middleton's tragedy Women Beware Women (c. 1623–24) is published posthumously in London.

== Births ==
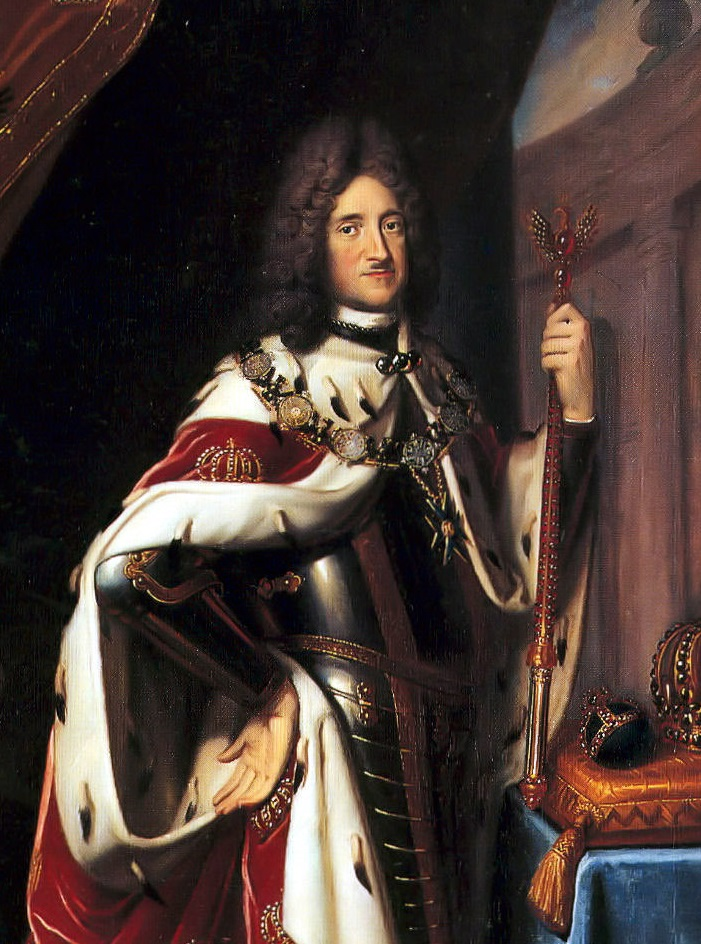
Frederick I of Prussia

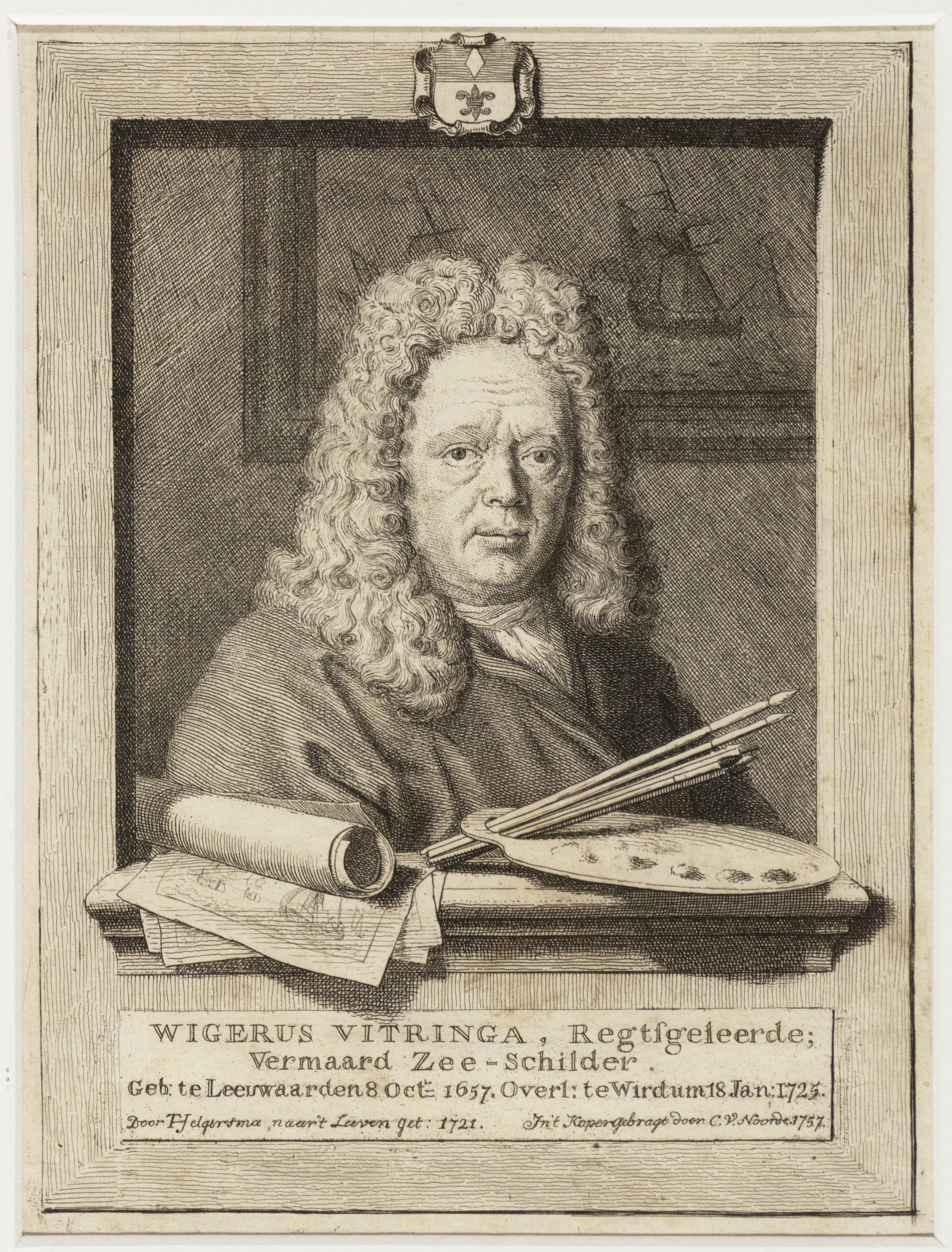
Wigerus Vitringa

- January 1 – Charles FitzCharles, 1st Earl of Plymouth, illegitimate son of King Charles II of England (d. 1680)
- January 4 – Sébastien Rale, French missionary (d. 1724)
- January 6 – William Bowes, English politician (d. 1707)
- January 11 – Elizabeth van der Woude, Dutch writer (d. 1694)
- January 17 – Pieter van Bloemen, Flemish painter (d. 1720)
- January 18 – Henry Casimir II, Prince of Nassau-Dietz, Stadholder of Friesland and Groningen (d. 1696)
- January 21 – Francesco Cupani, Italian naturalist (d. 1710)
- January 26 – William Wake, Archbishop of Canterbury (d. 1737)
- January 29 – Francis Moore, English physician and astrologer (d. 1715)
- February 10 – George Carpenter, 1st Baron Carpenter, English Army general (d. 1731)
- February 11 – Bernard Le Bovier de Fontenelle, French scientist and man of letters (d. 1757)
- February 21 – Blaise Gisbert, French Jesuit rhetorician and critic (d. 1731)
- February 24 – Clopton Havers, English physician (d. 1702)
- February 25 – Agathe de Saint-Père, French-Canadian business entrepreneur and inventor (d. 1748)
- March 1 – Samuel Werenfels, Swiss theologian (d. 1740)
- March 6 – Auguste Magdalene of Hessen-Darmstadt, German noblewoman and poet (d. 1674)
- March 18 – Giuseppe Ottavio Pitoni, Italian composer (d. 1743)
- March 19 – Jean Leclerc, Swiss theologian and biblical scholar (d. 1736)
- March 20 – Luigi Omodei (1607–1685), Italian Catholic cardinal (d. 1706)
- March 24 – Arai Hakuseki, Japanese politician and writer (d. 1725)
- April 16
  - Thomas Fairfax, 5th Lord Fairfax of Cameron, English politician (d. 1710)
  - Otto Friedrich von der Groeben, Prussian traveller, soldier and author (d. 1728)
- May 8 – Martino Altomonte, Italian painter (d. 1745)
- May 14 – Sambhaji, Maratha ruler (d. 1689)
- May 25 – Henri-Pons de Thiard de Bissy, French Catholic priest, bishop and cardinal (d. 1737)
- June 10 – James Craggs the Elder, English politician (d. 1721)
- June 14 – Sir William Blackett, 1st Baronet, of Newcastle-upon-Tyne, English politician (d. 1705)
- June 17 – Louis Ellies Dupin, French ecclesiastical historian (d. 1719)
- July 8 – Abraham de Peyster, New Amsterdam/New York politician (d. 1728)
- July 11 – King Frederick I of Prussia (d. 1713)
- July 12 – Friedrich Wilhelm III, Duke of Saxe-Altenburg (d. 1672)
- July 14 – William Cheyne, 2nd Viscount Newhaven, English politician (d. 1728)
- July 18 – Simon Digby, 4th Baron Digby, English politician (d. 1686)
- July 24
  - Theodorus Janssonius van Almeloveen, Dutch classical scholar (d. 1712)
  - Jean Mathieu de Chazelles, French hydrographer (d. 1710)
- July 25 – Philipp Heinrich Erlebach, German composer (d. 1714)
- August 7 – Henri Basnage de Beauval, French historian and lexicographer (d. 1710)
- August 9 – Pierre-Étienne Monnot, French sculptor (d. 1733)
- August 18
  - Ferdinando Galli-Bibiena, Italian architect and painter (d. 1743)
  - Antonio Margil, Spanish Franciscan missionary in North and Central America (d. 1726)
- September 14 – Sir Charles Blois, 1st Baronet, English politician (d. 1738)
- September 17
  - Dudley Cullum, English politician and baronet (d. 1720)
  - Pieter Schuyler, acting governor of the province of New York and army colonel (d. 1724)
- September 21 – Sultan Muhammad Akbar, Mughal prince (d. 1706)
- September 27 – Sofia Alekseyevna of Russia, Russian regent (d. 1704)
- September 29 – Heinrich of Saxe-Weissenfels, Count of Barby, German prince (d. 1728)
- October 2 – Guillaume Baudry, gunsmith and gold and silversmith in Lower Canada (d. 1732)
- October 4 – Francesco Solimena, Italian painter (d. 1747)
- October 8 – Wigerus Vitringa, Dutch painter (d. 1725)
- October 26 – Philipp, Duke of Saxe-Merseburg-Lauchstädt, German nobleman (d. 1690)
- November 6 – Joseph Denis, Canadian Rėcollet priest (d. 1736)
- November 12 – Anna Dorothea, Abbess of Quedlinburg (d. 1704)
- November 16 – Juliane Louise of East Frisia, Princess of East Frisia (d. 1715)
- November 26
  - William Derham, English clergyman and natural philosopher (d. 1735)
  - Michael Bernhard Valentini, German naturalist (d. 1729)
- November 28 – Philip Prospero, Prince of Asturias, heir apparent to the Spanish throne (d. 1661)
- December 2 – Franz Anton, Count of Hohenzollern-Haigerloch (d. 1702)
- December 8 – Changning, prince of the Qing dynasty (d. 1703)
- December 14 – Edmund Dunch, English Whig politician (d. 1719)
- December 15
  - Michel Richard Delalande, French composer (d. 1726)
  - Louis Thomas, Count of Soissons, Count of Soissons and Prince of Savoy (d. 1702)
- December 23
  - Hannah Duston, Massachusetts Puritan mother of 8, taken captive during King William's War (d. 1736)
  - Josiah Franklin, English-born American businessman, father of Benjamin Franklin (d. 1745)
- December 28 – Domenico Rossi, Swiss-Italian architect (d. 1737)

== Deaths ==
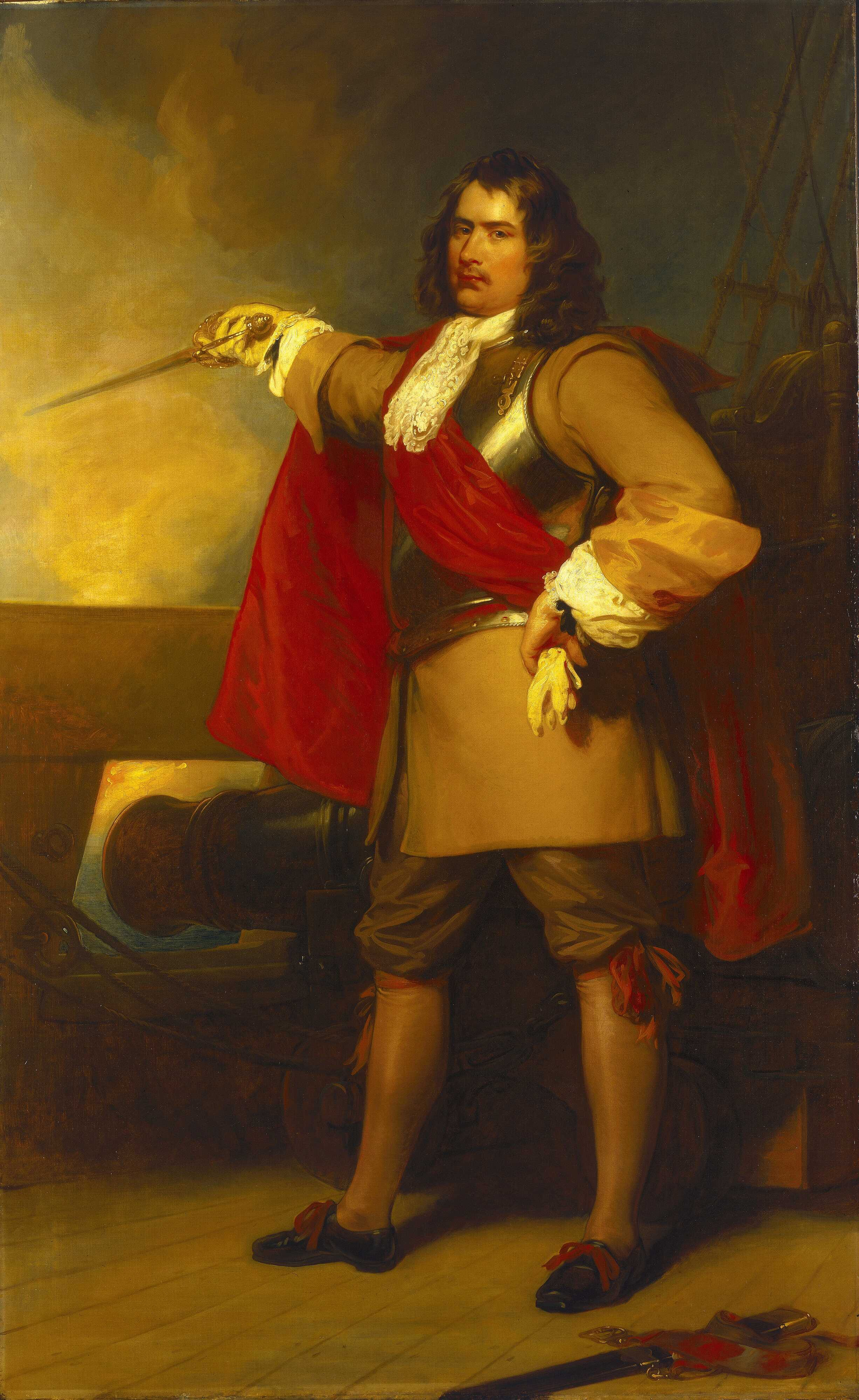
Robert Blake

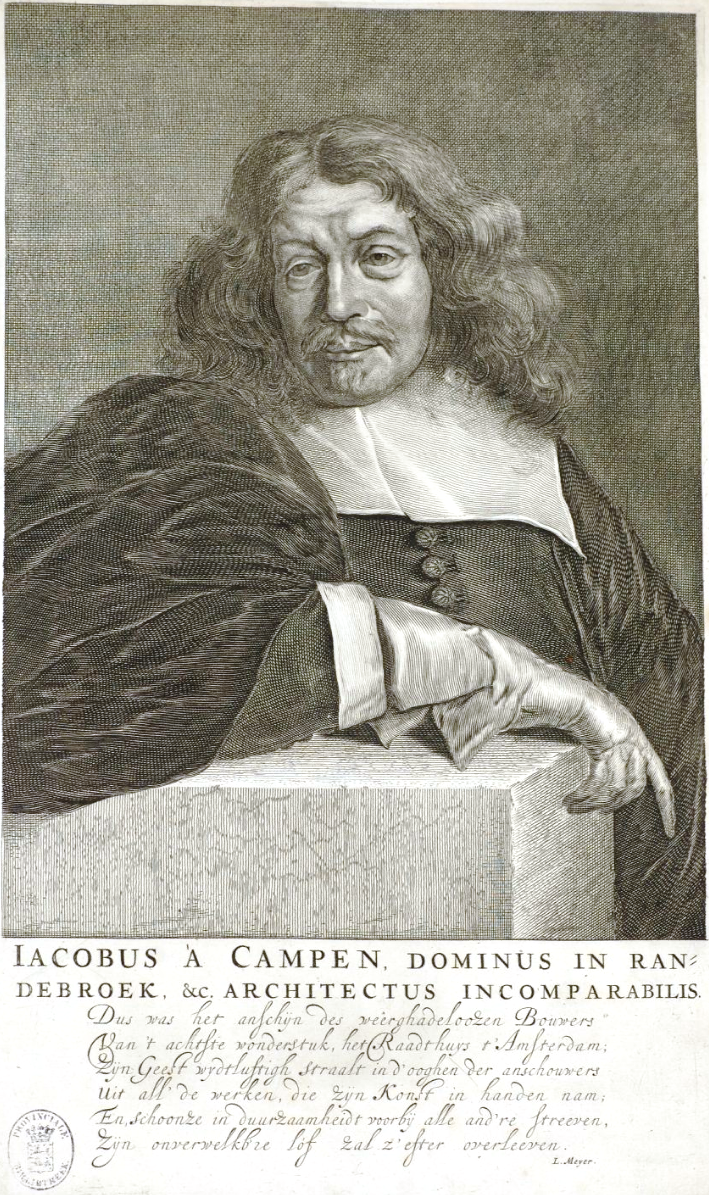
Jacob van Campen

- January 24 – Claude, Duke of Chevreuse (b. 1578)
- February 2 – Nicole, Duchess of Lorraine, French noble (b. 1608)
- February 7 – Cesare Dandini, Italian painter (b. 1596)
- February 8 – Laura Mancini, French court beauty (b. 1636)
- February 10 – Sebastian Stoskopff, French painter (b. 1597)
- February 19 – Jean Riolan the Younger, French anatomist (b. 1577)
- March – Edward Hopkins, colonial Connecticut politician (b. 1600)
- March 7 – Hayashi Razan, Japanese neo-Confucianist scholar (b. 1583)
- March 10 – Barthold Nihus, Roman Catholic priest (b. 1590)
- April ? – Richard Lovelace, English Cavalier poet (b. 1617)
- April 2
  - Ferdinand III, Holy Roman Emperor (b. 1608)
  - Jean-Jacques Olier, French Catholic priest (b. 1608)
- April 29 – Sophie Elisabeth Pentz, daughter of Christian IV of Denmark (b. 1619)
- May 7 – Nabeshima Katsushige, Japanese daimyō (b. 1580)
- May 9 – William Bradford, Governor of Plymouth Colony (b. 1590)
- May 10 – Gustav Horn, Count of Pori, Swedish soldier and politician (b. 1592)
- May 16 – Andrzej Bobola, Polish Jesuit missionary (b. 1591)
- June 3 – William Harvey, English physician (b. 1578)
- June 26 – Tobias Michael, German composer and cantor (b. 1592)
- July 17 – Eleonore Marie of Anhalt-Bernburg, Duchess consort of Mecklenburg-Güstrow (b. 1600)
- August 6 – Bohdan Khmelnytsky, Ukrainian Cossack Hetman (b. c. 1595)
- August 14 – Giovanni Paolo Lascaris, Italian 57th Grandmaster of the Knights Hospitaller (b. 1560)
- August 19 – Frans Snyders, Flemish painter (b. 1579)
- August 7 – Robert Blake, British admiral (b. 1599)
- August 29 – John Lilburne, English dissenter (b. c. 1614)
- September 1 – Arnold Vinnius, Dutch lawyer (b. 1588)
- September 7 – Arvid Wittenberg, Swedish field marshal and statesman (b. 1606)
- September 13 – Jacob van Campen, Dutch artist (b. 1596)
- September 23 – Joachim Jungius, German mathematician and philosopher (b. 1587)
- September 27 – Olimpia Maidalchini, politically active Roman noble (b. 1591)
- October 4 – Prince Maurice of Savoy, Catholic cardinal and Prince of Savoy (b. 1593)
- October 23 – Domenico Massenzio, Italian baroque composer (b. 1586)
- November 5 – Charles II, Duke of Elbeuf, French noble (b. 1596)
- November 10 – Anders Bille, Danish general (b. 1600)
- November 18 – Luke Wadding, Irish Franciscan friar and historian (b. 1588)
- November 20 – Sir Hugh Cholmeley, 1st Baronet, English politician (b. 1600)
- December 5 – Johan Oxenstierna, Swedish count and statesman (b. 1611)
- December 24 – Philippe Le Sueur de Petiville, French poet (b. 1607)
- date unknown – Willem Bontekoe, Dutch sea captain (b. 1587)
