= 1590 =

1590 in various calendars
- Gregorian calendar: 1590; MDXC
- Ab urbe condita: 2343
- Armenian calendar: 1039; ԹՎ ՌԼԹ
- Assyrian calendar: 6340
- Balinese saka calendar: 1511–1512
- Bengali calendar: 996–997
- Berber calendar: 2540
- English Regnal year: 32 Eliz. 1 – 33 Eliz. 1
- Buddhist calendar: 2134
- Burmese calendar: 952
- Byzantine calendar: 7098–7099
- Chinese calendar: 己丑年 (Earth Ox); 4287 or 4080 — to — 庚寅年 (Metal Tiger); 4288 or 4081
- Coptic calendar: 1306–1307
- Discordian calendar: 2756
- Ethiopian calendar: 1582–1583
- Hebrew calendar: 5350–5351
- Hindu calendars
- Vikram Samvat: 1646–1647
- Shaka Samvat: 1511–1512
- Kali Yuga: 4690–4691
- Holocene calendar: 11590
- Igbo calendar: 590–591
- Iranian calendar: 968–969
- Islamic calendar: 998–999
- Japanese calendar: Tenshō 18 (天正１８年)
- Javanese calendar: 1510–1511
- Julian calendar: Gregorian minus 10 days
- Korean calendar: 3923
- Minguo calendar: 322 before ROC 民前322年
- Nanakshahi calendar: 122
- Thai solar calendar: 2132–2133
- Tibetan calendar: ས་མོ་གླང་ལོ་ (female Earth-Ox); 1716 or 1335 or 563 — to — ལྕགས་ཕོ་སྟག་ལོ་ (male Iron-Tiger); 1717 or 1336 or 564

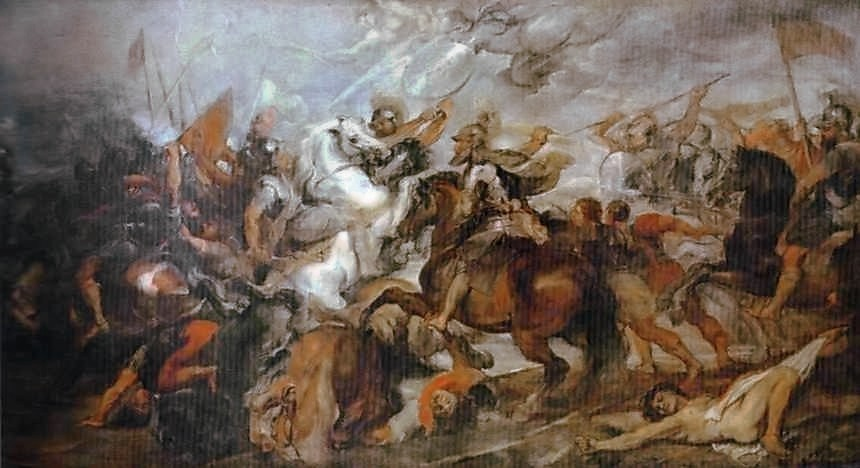
March 14: The Battle of Ivry takes place in France

1590 (MDXC) was a common year starting on Monday of the Gregorian calendar and a common year starting on Thursday of the Julian calendar, the 1590th year of the Common Era (CE) and Anno Domini (AD) designations, the 590th year of the 2nd millennium, the 90th year of the 16th century, and the 1st year of the 1590s decade. As of the start of 1590, the Gregorian calendar was 10 days ahead of the Julian calendar, which remained in localized use until 1923.

== Events ==
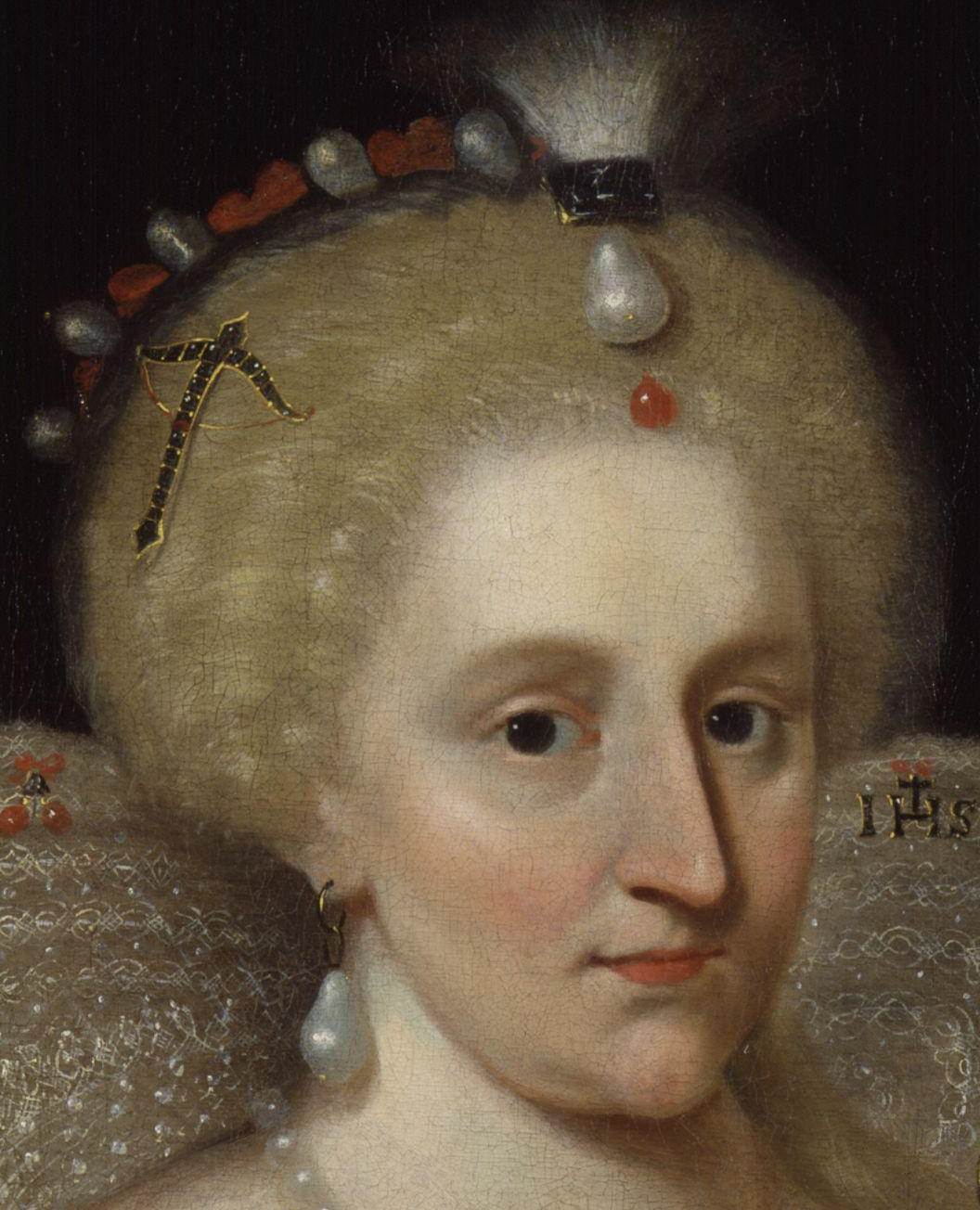
May 17: Anne of Denmark is crowned queen consort of Scotland.

=== January–March ===
- January 6 – García Hurtado de Mendoza becomes the new Viceroy of Peru (nominally including most of South America except for Brazil). He will serve until 1596.
- January 10 – Construction of the Fortezza Nuova around the city of Livorno begins in Italy in the Grand Duchy of Tuscany on the orders of Ferdinando I de' Medici, Grand Duke of Tuscany and continues for more than 14 years.
- January 25 – Luis de Velasco y Castilla, Marquess of Salinas, becomes the new Viceroy of New Spain, a colony comprising most of Central America, Mexico and what is now a large part of the southwestern United States. Velasco will govern until 1595, and then again from 1607 to 1611.
- February 3 – Peter Ernst I von Mansfeld-Vorderort, the German-born commander of the Spanish Imperial Army captures the German fortress of Rheinberg after a four-year long siege during the Eighty Years' War.
- March 4 – Maurice of Nassau, Prince of Orange, takes Breda, by concealing 68 of his best men in a peat-boat, to get through the impregnable defenses.
- March 14 – Battle of Ivry: Henry IV of France again defeats the forces of the Catholic League, under Charles, Duke of Mayenne.
- March 21 – The Treaty of Constantinople is signed between the Ottoman Empire (in modern-day Turkey) and the Safavid Empire (modern-day Iran), ending a 12-year war between the two nations.

=== April–June ===
- April 4 – The Cortes of Castile approves a new subsidy, the millones.
- April 24 – Ten armed English merchant vessels of the Levant Company are intercepted by 12 galleys of the Spanish Navy while attempting to pass through the Straits of Gibraltar after trading in the Mediterranean Sea. Levant Company's Benedict Barnham, on the flagship Salomon, leads the corporate fleet in a six-hour battle and heavily damages the Spanish ships, clearing the way for the company ships to return home.
- May 7 – King Henry of Navarre, claimant to the throne of France, begins an unsuccessful attempt to besiege Paris, at the time controlled by the Catholic League. By August 30, Henry is forced to raise the siege, when Alexander Farnese, Duke of Parma comes to its rescue with a Spanish army.
- May 17 – Anne of Denmark is crowned queen consort of Scotland, at Holyrood Abbey in Edinburgh.
- June 23 – The Japanese samurai Toyotomi Hideyoshi sends an army of 15,000 men, led by generals Maeda Toshiie and Uesugi Kagekatsu, in an attack on the Hachiōji Castle in what is now Tokyo. The castle is lightly defended, by only 1,300 men, because the samurai Hōjō Ujiteru has most of his troops engaged in defending Hideyohsi's siege of Odawara. The castle is captured after one day, and later destroyed on orders of the shogun Tokugawa Ieyasu.

=== July–September ===
- July 1 (13th waning of 1st Ashadha, 952 CS) – Naresuan Maharat becomes the new ruler of Thailand as Sanphet II of the Ayutthaya Kingdom, upon the death of his father, Sanphet I.
- July 19 – The day after his 12th birthday, Ferdinand of Habsburg becomes the new Archduke of Inner Austria (Innerösterreich) upon the death, in Graz, of his father Charles II. A regency council rules in the place of Ferdinand until 1596.
- July 21 – Japan's first diplomatic representatives to Europe, Itō Mancio, Michele Chijiwa, Giuliano Nakaura and Martino Hara, return to Japan after eight years, having departed on February 20, 1582.
- August 4 – In Japan, the siege of Odawara, part of Toyotomi Hideyoshi's campaign to eliminate the clan of samurais led by Hōjō Ujinao, ends with the surrender of Odawara, part of Toyotomi's unification of the country.
- August 18 – John White, governor of the Colony of Roanoke, returns to Roanoke after having left the North American colony in 1587 to get supplies. Upon arrival at, the crew of the ships Hopewell and Moonlight find that the Roanoke Colony is deserted, with the only clues to where the colonist went being the word "CRO" carved into a tree, and the word CROATOAN (believed to be a reference to Hatteras Island, where the colonists formerly lived).
- August 27 – Pope Sixtus V dies after serving for five years, and a new papal conclave is organized, to start on September 7 at the Apostolic Palace in Rome.
- September 5 – Alexander Farnese's army forces Henry IV of France to lift the siege of Paris.
- September 15
  - After the eight day conclave, Giovanni Battista Castagna, the Cardinal-Priest of San Marcello al Corso receives the necessary two-thirds majority despite support for Cardinal Marco Antonio Colonna. Castagna becomes Pope Urban VII but contracts malaria and dies 12 days later.
  - The estimated 6.0 magnitude Neulengbach earthquake causes significant damage and some loss of life, in Lower Austria and Vienna; the effects are felt as far as Bohemia and Silesia.

=== October–December ===
- October 6 – Two days before the scheduled papal conclave begins, Enrique de Guzmán, 2nd Count of Olivares, Spain's ambassador to the Papal States, presents the cardinals with the recommendations of King Philip II of Spain, a set of candidates whom the Spanish cardinals will support, and 30 whom they are instructed not to vote for.
- October 8 – The second papal conclave in less than four weeks opens at the Apostolic Palace in Rome, 23 days after the previous conclave had been concluded, and 53 cardinals arrive.
- October 13
  - (5th waxing of Tazaungmon 952 ME) – In what is now Myanmar, King Nanda Bayin of Burma sends a 10,000-man army, led by the Viceroy Thado Dhamma Yaza III of Prome, and General Natshinnaung to suppress a rebellion in the Shan state of Mogaung.
  - German astronomer Michael Maestlin becomes the first person to record an observation of the occultation of the planet Mars by the planet Venus.
- October 16 – Saadian invasion of the Songhai Empire: An army of 20,000 troops, led by Judar Pasha is dispatched from Marrakesh in the Saadi Sultanate (now Morocco), on orders of Sultan Ahmad al-Mansur. The Saadi Army's objective is to conquer the Songhai Empire, led by the Emperor Askia Ishaq II, in North Africa, corresponding to what is now the Republic of Mali.
- October 24 – After an unsuccessful search of the "lost colony" of Roanoke, English officer John White and the surviving crew of the ships Hopewell and Moonlight return to England.
- November 22 (12th waning of Tazaungmon 952 ME) – Burmese King Nanda Bayin sends a his son, the Crown Prince Mingyi Swa and 20,000 troops to what is now Thailand.
- November 29 – A truce is signed between representatives of the Holy Roman Empire (ruled by Emperor Rudolf II) and the Ottoman Empire (ruled by Sultan Murad III).
- December 5 – Niccolò Sfondrato, Cardinal-priest of Santa Cecilia in Trastevere, is elected as the new pope and takes the name Pope Gregory XIV. Sfondrato is selected as a compromise candidate after Gabriele Paleotti falls 3 votes short of being elected.
- December 7 – North Berwick witch trials: Agnes Sampson is questioned by King James VI of Scotland, and confesses to practising witchcraft. She will be executed on January 28.

=== Date unknown ===
- Orthodox Patriarch of Alexandria Meletius I succeeds Silvester.
- The Spanish are pushed out of southern Gelderland by the Dutch forces.

== Births ==
=== January–June ===
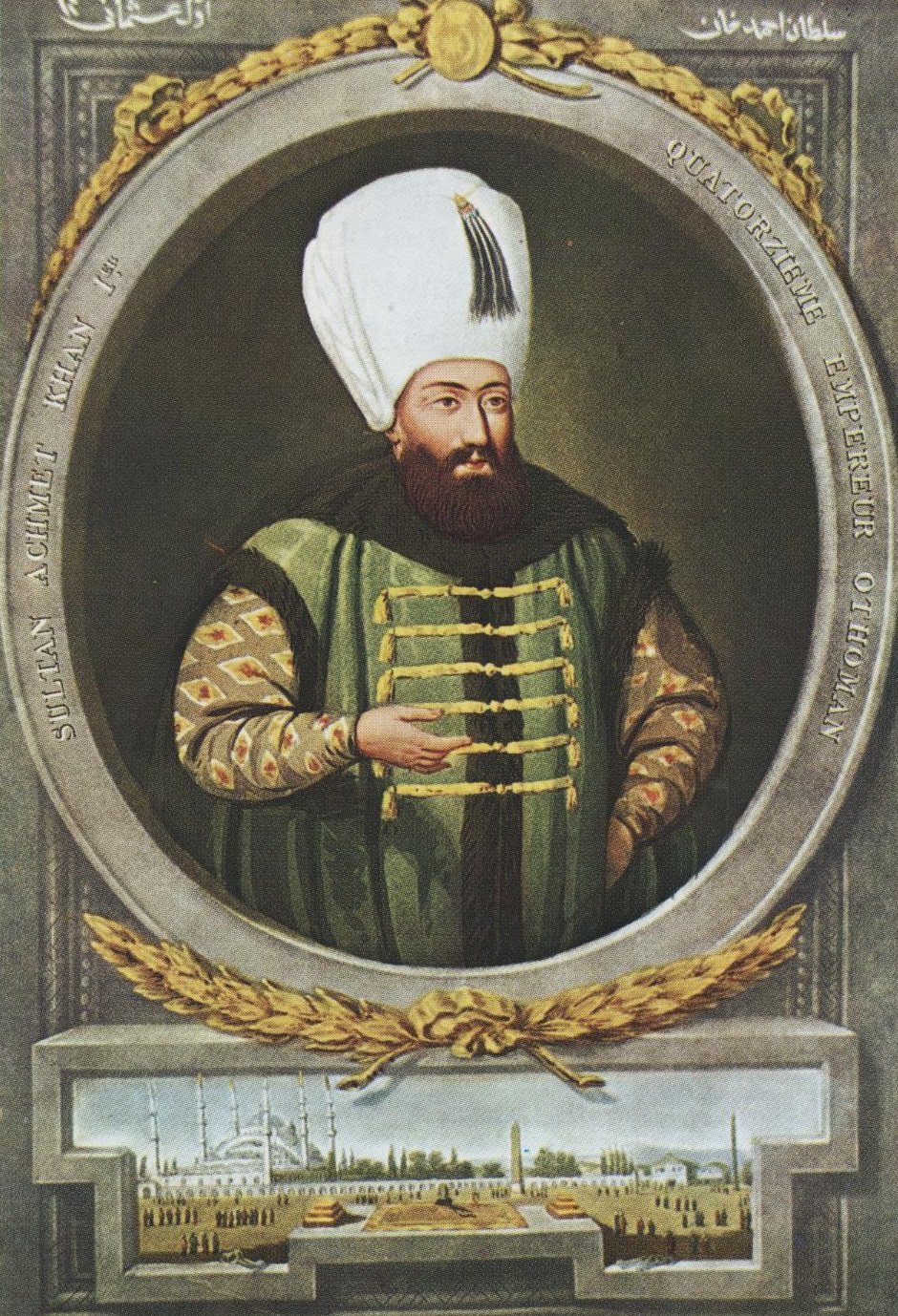
Emperor Ahmed I

- January 9 – Simon Vouet, French painter (d. 1649)
- January 13 – Arthur Bell, English Franciscan martyr (d. 1643)
- January 20
  - Edward Convers, American settler (d. 1663)
  - Benedetta Carlini, Italian mystic (d. 1661)
- January 27 – Charles Caesar, English politician and judge (d. 1642)
- January 30 – Lady Anne Clifford, 14th Baroness de Clifford (d. 1676)
- February 7 – Barthold Nihus, Roman Catholic priest (d. 1657)
- March – Roger Ludlow, one of the founders of the colony (later the state) of Connecticut (d. 1664)
- March 6 – Margaret of the Blessed Sacrament, French Discalced Carmelite nun (d. 1660)
- March 10 – Dietrich Reinkingk, German lawyer and politician (d. 1664)
- March 18 – Manuel de Faria e Sousa, Spanish and Portuguese historian and poet (d. 1649)
- March 29 – Michael Reyniersz Pauw, Dutch businessman (d. 1640)
- April 7
  - Louis de Dieu, Dutch theologian (d. 1642)
  - John Upton, English politician (d. 1641)
- April 18 – Ahmed I, Ottoman Sultan (d. 1617)
- May – William Cecil, 17th Baron de Ros (d. 1618)
- May 3 – Franco Burgersdijk, Dutch logician (d. 1635)
- May 5
  - John Albert II, Duke of Mecklenburg (d. 1636)
  - Jakub Sobieski, Polish noble (d. 1646)
- May 12 – Cosimo II de' Medici, Grand Duke of Tuscany (d. 1621)
- May 31 – Frances Carr, Countess of Somerset (d. 1632)
- June 1 – Isaac Manasses de Pas, Marquis de Feuquieres, French soldier (d. 1640)
- June 9 – Caspar Sibelius, Dutch Protestant minister (d. 1658)
- June 19 – Philip Bell, British colonial governor (d. 1678)
- June 24 – Samuel Ampzing, Dutch linguist and historian (d. 1632)
- June 29 – Edward Rodney, English politician (d. 1657)

=== July–December ===
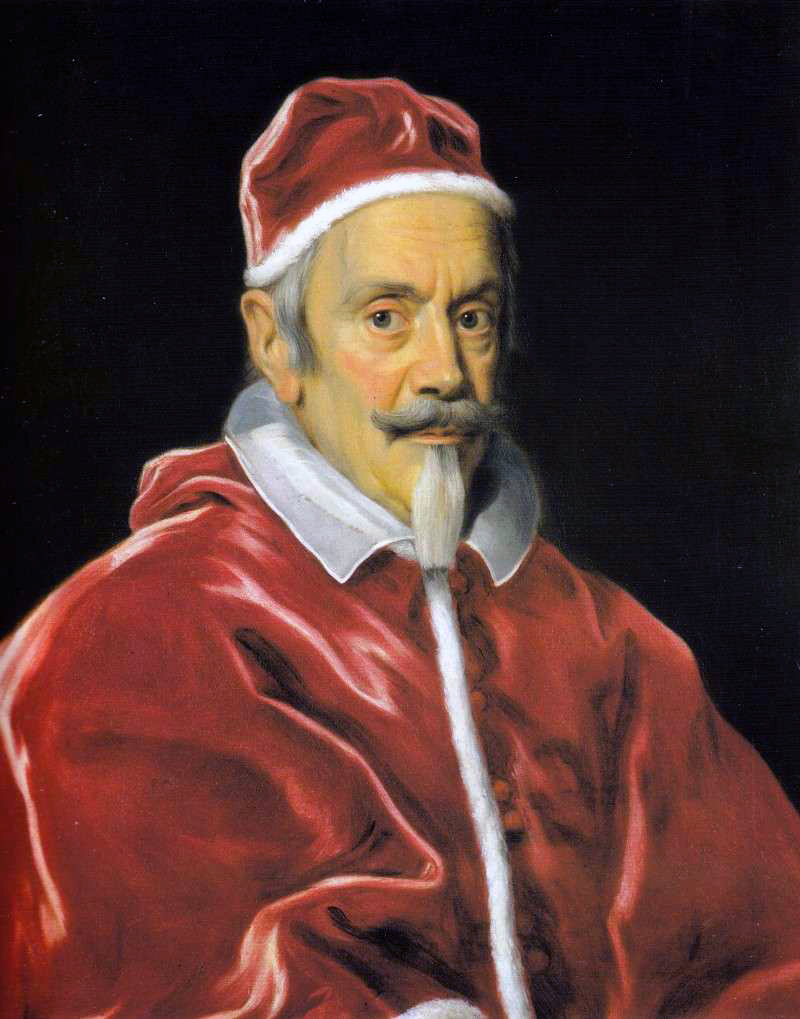
Pope Clement X

- July 3 – Lucrezia Orsina Vizzana, Italian singer and composer (d. 1662)
- July 13 – Pope Clement X (d. 1676)
- July 26 – Johannes Crellius, Polish–German theologian (d. 1633)
- August 6 – Count John Louis of Nassau-Hadamar (d. 1653)
- August 7 – Charles of Austria, Bishop of Wroclaw (d. 1624)
- August 9 – John Webster, colonial settler and governor of Connecticut (d. 1661)
- August 19 – Henry Rich, 1st Earl of Holland, English soldier (d. 1649)
- August 27 – Ferruccio Baffa Trasci, Italian bishop (d. 1656)
- August 30 – Anthony Stapley, English politician (d. 1655)
- September 12 – María de Zayas, Spanish writer (d. 1661)
- September 15 – Erasmus Earle, English barrister and politician (d. 1667)
- October 3 – Anna of Pomerania, Duchess-Consort of Croy and Havré (d. 1660)
- October 11 – William Pynchon, English colonist and fur trader in North America (d. 1662)
- November 25 – Juan Alonso de Cuevas y Davalos, Roman Catholic prelate, Archbishop of Mexico and Antequera (d. 1665)
- December 3 – Daniel Seghers, Flemish Jesuit brother and painter (d. 1661)
- December 14 – John West, colonial governor of Virginia (d. 1659)
- December 18 – William Louis, Count of Nassau-Saarbrücken (d. 1640)

=== Date unknown ===
- Angelica Veronica Airola, Italian painter (d. 1670)
- Boris Morozov, Russian statesman and boyar (d. 1661)
- Isaac de Caus, French landscaper (d. 1648)
- Yamada Nagamasa, Japanese adventurer (d. 1630)
- Ii Naokatsu, Japanese daimyō (d. 1662)

=== Probable ===
- William Bradford, English leader of Plymouth Colony (d. 1657)
- William Browne, English poet (d. 1645)
- Theophilus Eaton, Puritan colonial merchant (d. 1658)
- Kösem Sultan (d. 1651)
- Mícheál Ó Cléirigh, Irish chronicler (d. 1643)
- Marie Vernier, French actress (d. 1627)
- Caterina Assandra, Italian composer (died c. 1618)
- Magdalena Andersdotter, Norwegian-Faroese shipowner (d. 1650)
- Teofila Chmielecka, Polish military role model (d. 1650)
- Marie Fouquet, French medical writer and philanthropist (d. 1681)

== Deaths ==
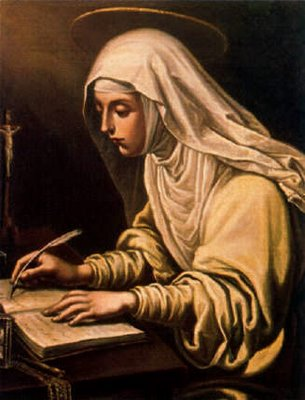
Saint Catherine de Ricci

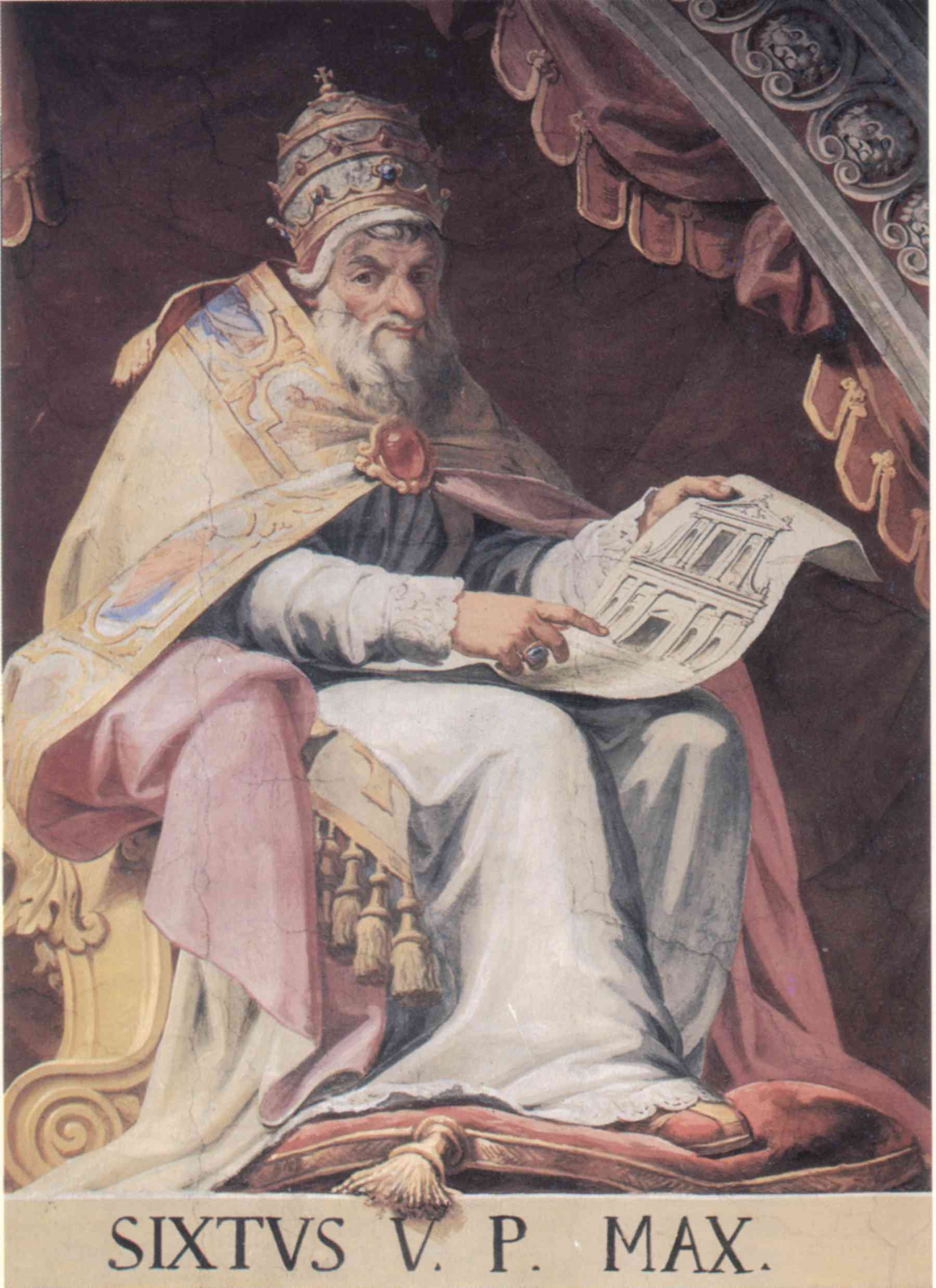
Pope Sixtus V

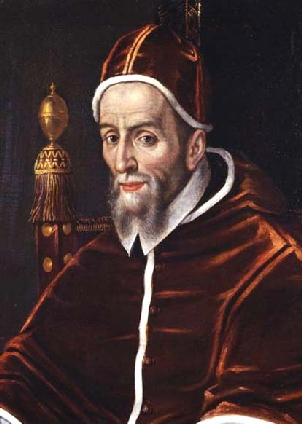
Pope Urban VII

- January 7 – Jakob Andreae, German theologian (b. 1528)
- January 20 – Giambattista Benedetti, Italian mathematician and physicist (b. 1530)
- February 1 – Lawrence Humphrey, president of Magdalen College, Oxford (b. 1527)
- February 2 – Catherine of Ricci, Catholic prioress and saint (b. 1522)
- February 4 – Gioseffo Zarlino, Italian music theorist and composer (b. 1517)
- February 12
  - François Hotman, French Protestant lawyer and writer (b. 1524)
  - Blanche Parry, personal attendant to Elizabeth I of England (b. c. 1508)
- February 18 – Asahi no kata, Japanese lady, Toyotomi Hideyoshi's half-sister (b. 1543)
- February 19 – Philipp IV, Count of Hanau-Lichtenberg (b. 1514)
- February 21 – Ambrose Dudley, 3rd Earl of Warwick, English nobleman and general (b. 1528)
- March 4 – Duchess Hedwig of Württemberg, by marriage countess of Hesse-Marburg (b. 1547)
- April 2 – Elisabeth of Saxony, Countess Palatine of Simmern (b. 1552)
- April 6 – Francis Walsingham, English spymaster (b. 1530)
- May 9 – Charles de Bourbon French cardinal and pretender to the throne (b. 1523)
- June 28 – Hori Hidemasa, Japanese warlord (b. 1553)
- June 30 – Maha Thammaracha (b. 1509)
- July 10 – Charles II, Archduke of Austria, regent of Inner Austria (b. 1540)
- July 21 – Sophie of Württemberg, German noble (b. 1563)
- August 10
  - Hōjō Ujimasa, Japanese warlord (b. 1538)
  - Hōjō Ujiteru, Japanese warlord (b. 1540？)
- August 17 – James III, Margrave of Baden-Hachberg (b. 1562)
- August 27 – Pope Sixtus V (b. 1521)
- September 10 – Archduchess Magdalena of Austria, Member of the House of Habsburg (b. 1532)
- September 13 – Pedro Téllez-Girón, 1st Duke of Osuna, Spanish duke (b. 1537)
- September 20 – Lodovico Agostini, Italian composer (b. 1534)
- September 27 – Pope Urban VII (b. 1521)
- October 4 – Jacques Cujas, French legal expert (b. 1522)
- October 12 – Kanō Eitoku, Japanese painter (b. 1543)
- October 16 – Archduchess Anna of Austria, Duchess of Bavaria (b. 1528)
- October 18 – Philip, Duke of Holstein-Gottorp (b. 1570)
- October 23 – Bernardino de Sahagún, Franciscan missionary (b. 1499)
- October 29 – Dirck Volckertszoon Coornhert, Dutch politician and theologian (b. 1522)
- November 18 – George Talbot, 6th Earl of Shrewsbury, English statesman (b. 1528)
- November 19 – Girolamo Zanchi, Italian theologian (b. 1516)
- November 29 – Philipp Nicodemus Frischlin, German philologist and poet (b. 1547)
- December 20 – Ambroise Paré, French surgeon (b. 1510)
- December 27 – Emanuel Philibert de Lalaing, Belgian noble and army commander (b. 1557)

=== Date unknown ===
- Nicholas Bobadilla, one of the first Spanish Jesuits (b. 1511)
- Marietta Robusti, Venetian Renaissance painter (b. 1555 or 1560)
- Roger Dudley, British soldier (b. 1535)
- Sorley Boy MacDonnell, Irish chieftain (b. 1505)
- Juan Bautista de Pomar, Spanish colonial historian and writer
- Catherine Salvaresso, Wallachian regent
- Maddalena Casulana, Italian composer, lutenist and singer (d. 1544)

=== Probable ===
Bernard Palissy, French potter (b. 1510)
