= Marie Elisabeth of Hesse-Darmstadt =

- Duchess consort of Saxe-Römhild
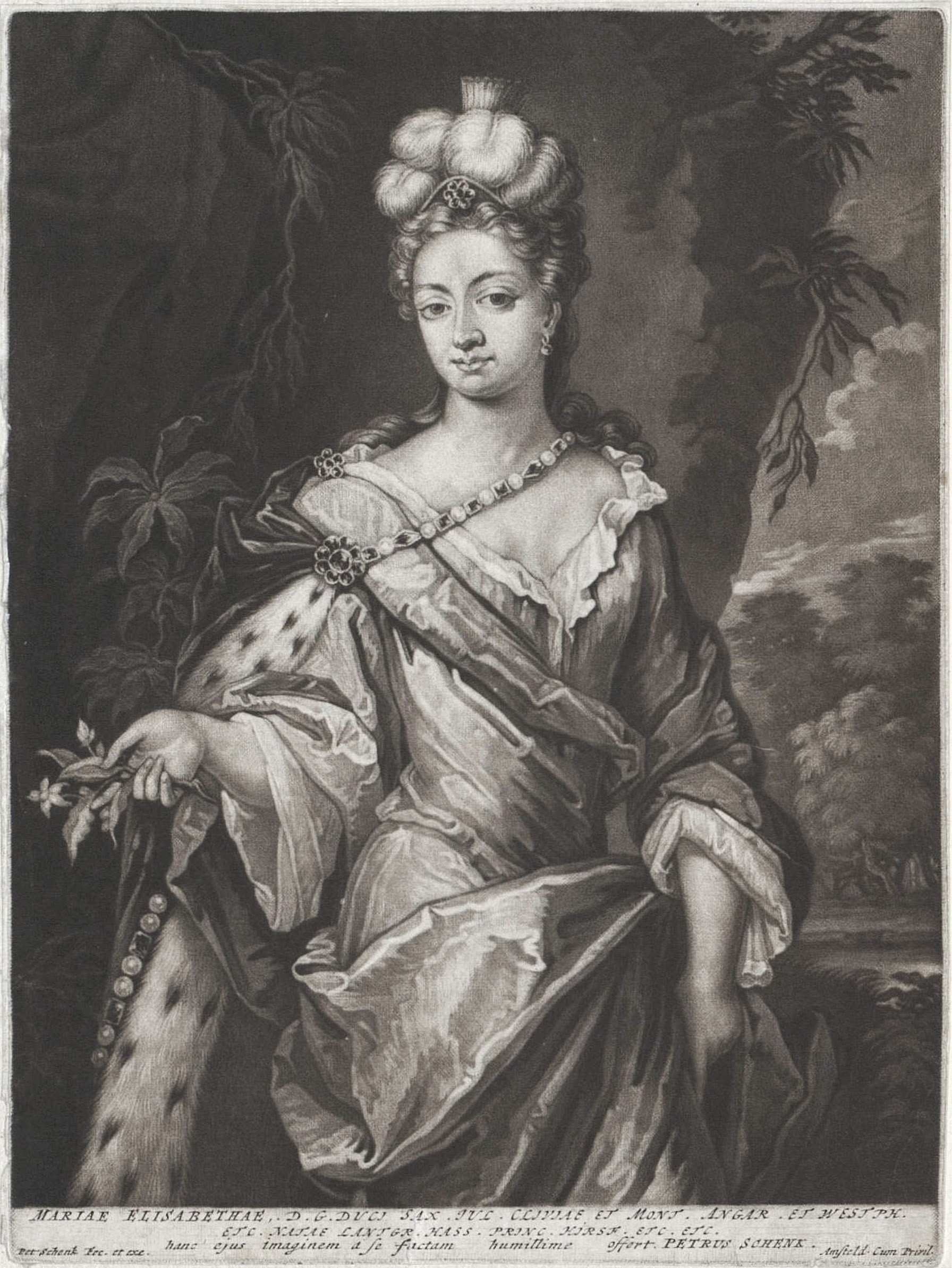
- Born: 11 March 1656; Darmstadt, Germany
- Died: 16 August 1715 (aged 59); Römhild, Thuringia
- Spouse: Henry, Duke of Saxe-Römhild (m. 1676; died 1710)
- Father: Louis VI of Hesse-Darmstadt
- Mother: Maria Elisabeth of Holstein-Gottorp

Marie Elisabeth of Hesse-Darmstadt (11 March 1656 – 16 August 1715) was a daughter of Louis VI of Hesse-Darmdstadt and his first wife Maria Elisabeth of Holstein-Gottorp. By her marriage to Henry, Duke of Saxe-Römhild, she was a Duchess consort of Hesse-Darmstadt.

== Early life ==
Marie Elisabeth was born on 11 March 1656 as the fourth child of Louis VI, Landgrave of Hesse-Darmstadt and his first wife, Maria Elisabeth of Holstein-Gottorp, a daughter of Duke Frederick III, Duke of Holstein-Gottorp. Marie Elisabeth's mother died in childbirth when the girl was just nine years old; her father remarried the following year to Elisabeth Dorothea of Saxe-Gotha-Altenburg, with whom he went on to have eight more children.

== Marriage ==
On 1 March 1676, Marie Elisabeth married Henry, Duke of Saxe-Römhild, who at the time of the marriage ruled Saxe-Gotha jointly alongside his six brothers. In 1680, the brothers divided the country and Henry became the Duke of Saxe-Römhild. He had resided there since 1676, in Römhild. After Henry's death, a dispute erupted among his remaining brothers over the inheritance of Saxe-Römhild. This dispute was settled definitively in 1765.

Henry loved his wife very much. He always called her by the name "Marielies" and had several luxurious buildings built in her honor, including a cave house called "Marie Elisabeth Delight". Despite constant pregnancies, she had no surviving children. Henry died in 1710, leaving a massive debt. Marie Elisabeth outlived her husband by five years before she died on 16 August 1715 at the age of 59 in Römhild, Thuringia.

== Sources ==
- Association of Saxe-Meiningen history and cultural studies (ed.): New Geography of the duchy of Saxe-Meiningen, Hildburghausen 1903
