= Ludwig VI =

Ludwig VI may refer to:

- Louis VI the Roman (of Bavaria) (1328–1365)
- Louis VI, Elector Palatine (1539–1583)
- Louis VI, Landgrave of Hesse-Darmstadt (1630–1678)
