= Ludwig VII =

Ludwig VII may refer to:

- Louis VII, Duke of Bavaria (c. 1368–1447)
- Louis VII, Landgrave of Hesse-Darmstadt (1658–1678)
