= Maria Elisabeth of Holstein-Gottorp =

Maria Elisabeth of Schleswig-Holstein-Gottorp
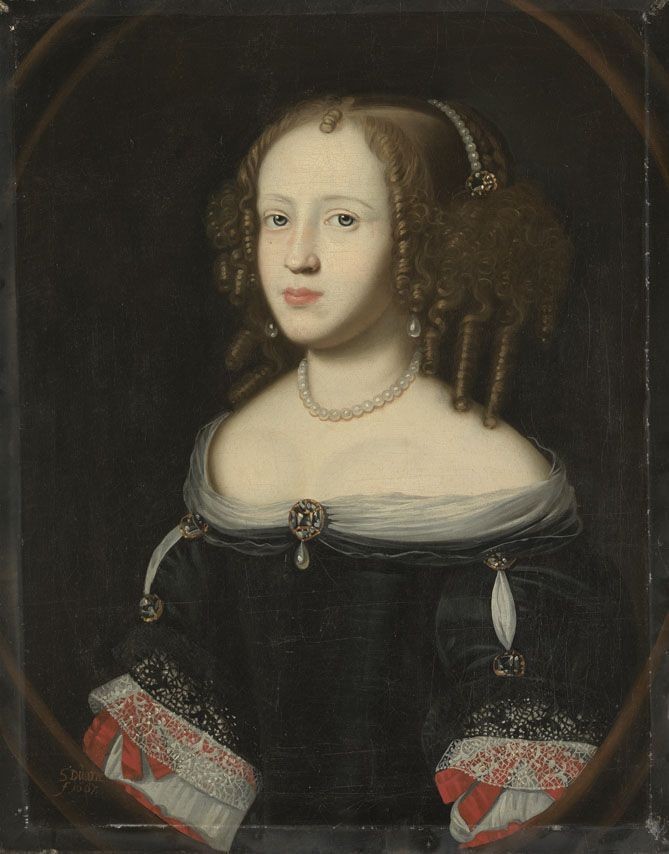
- Portrait of Maria Elisabeth, 1667
- Born: 6 June 1634; Gottorf Castle
- Died: 17 June 1665 (aged 31); Darmstadt
- Spouse: Louis VI, Landgrave of Hesse-Darmstadt (m. 1650)
- Issue: Magdalene Sybilla, Duchess of Württemberg; Princess Sophie Eleonore; Prince George; Marie Elisabeth, Duchess of Saxe-Römhild; Princess Auguste Magdalene; Louis VII, Landgrave of Hesse-Darmstadt; Prince Friedrich; Sophie Marie, Duchess of Saxe-Eisenberg
- House: Holstein-Gottorp
- Father: Frederick III of Schleswig-Holstein-Gottorp
- Mother: Duchess Marie Elisabeth of Saxony

Maria Elisabeth of Schleswig-Holstein-Gottorp (6 June 1634, in Gottorp Castle – 17 June 1665, in Darmstadt) was a landgravine of Hesse-Darmstadt by marriage.

== Life ==
Maria Elisabeth was a daughter of Frederick III of Schleswig-Holstein-Gottorp (1597–1659) from his marriage to Duchess Marie Elisabeth of Saxony (1610–1684), a daughter of John George I, Elector of Saxony.

She was married on 24 November 1650 at Gottorp Castle to Louis, who later became Louis VI, Landgrave of Hesse-Darmstadt (1630–1678), whom she had been engaged to since his birthday in 1649. On the occasion of the wedding, the last sword dance in Hesse was performed at a festival in Lollar.

His father drew Louis into the government business in the year after their marriage in 1651. Louis succeeded his father in 1661. Louis tied extensive political relations with Sweden via Maria Elizabeth's sister Hedvig Eleonora, Queen of Sweden.

Maria Elisabeth died following complications in her last childbirth in 1665, aged just 31. Like her mother, she had been constantly pregnant during her marriage, giving birth almost once a year. Her death plunged Louis into deep mourning; he wrote some poems in memory of his wife. On 5 December 1666, just under a year and a half after Maria Elisabeth's death, her widower remarried to Elisabeth Dorothea of Saxe-Gotha-Altenburg, with whom he went on to have eight more children.

== Offspring ==
Maria Elisabeth had eleven pregnancies, of which nine were live births, in just 14 years. Only three of her children lived to mature adulthood:

- Magdalena Sybille (1652–1712)

married in 1673 Duke William Louis of Württemberg (1647–1677)

- Sophie Eleonore (born and died 1653)
- George (1654–1655), died in infancy
- Marie Elisabeth (1656–1715)

married in 1676 Duke Henry of Saxe-Römhild (1650–1710)

- Auguste Magdalene (1657–1674), died in adolescence
- Louis VII (1658–1678), Landgrave of Hesse-Darmstadt, died in adolescence
- Frederick (1659–1676), died in adolescence
- Marie Sophie (1661–1712)

married in 1681 Duke Christian of Saxe-Eisenberg (1653–1707)

- Miscarriage (1663)
- Miscarriage (1664)
- Unnamed child who died shortly after birth (1665)

== Sources ==
- Heinrich Zehfu: antiquity of the royal capital Darmstadt, p. 60 (in German)
- magazine for German cultural history, p. 345 (in German)
- Georg Friedrich Teuthorn: extensive history of Hesse, p. 582 (in German)

| Vacant Title last held by Sophia Eleonore of Saxony | Landgravine consort of Hesse-Darmstadt; 1661–1665 | Vacant Title next held by Elisabeth Dorothea of Saxe-Gotha-Altenburg |
