= Louis VI =

Louis VI may refer to:

- Louis VI of France, "the Fat" (1081–1137)
- Louis VI the Roman (1328–1365), Duke of Bavaria and Elector of Brandenburg
- Louis VI, Elector Palatine (ruled 1576–1583)
- Louis VI of Hesse-Darmstadt (ruled 1661–1678)
- Louis VI, Prince of Condé (1756–1830).
