= Henry, Duke of Saxe-Römhild =

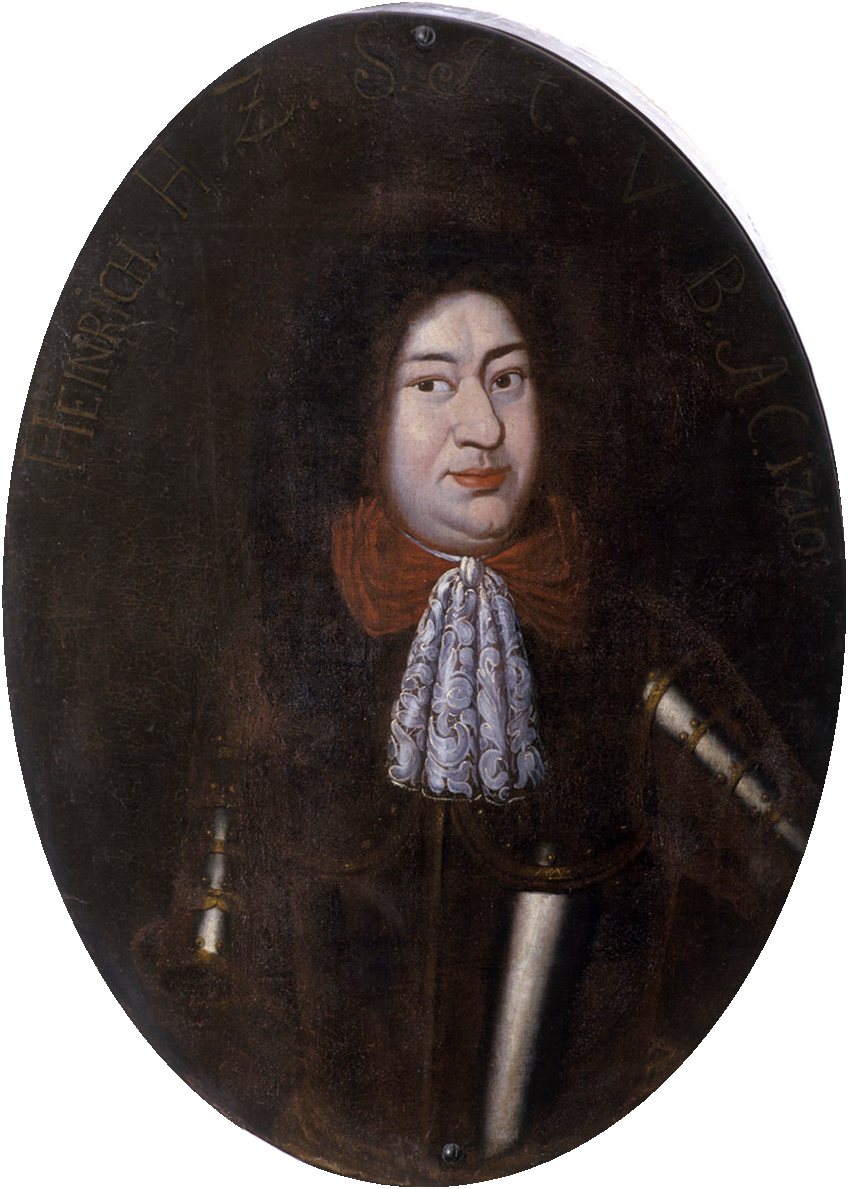

Duke of Saxe-Römhild
- Reign: 1675–1710
- Predecessor: New creation
- Successor: John Ernest IV
- Born: 19 November 1650; Gotha
- Died: 13 May 1710 (aged 59); Römhild
- Burial: Römhild
- Spouse: Marie Elisabeth of Hesse-Darmstadt (m. 1676)
- House: Wettin (Ernestine line)
- Father: Ernst I, Duke of Saxe-Coburg-Altenburg
- Mother: Elisabeth Sophie of Saxe-Altenburg

Henry of Saxe-Römhild (German: Heinrich von Sachsen-Römhild; 19 November 1650 – 13 May 1710) was the sole ruler of the short-lived Duchy of Saxe-Römhild, an Ernestine principality within the Holy Roman Empire. He entered imperial military service at a young age and steadily rose through the ranks, attaining the high office of Imperial Generalfeldzeugmeister (General of the Ordnance) in 1697. In recognition of his distinguished service, he was awarded the prestigious Order of the Elephant in 1698.

== Life ==
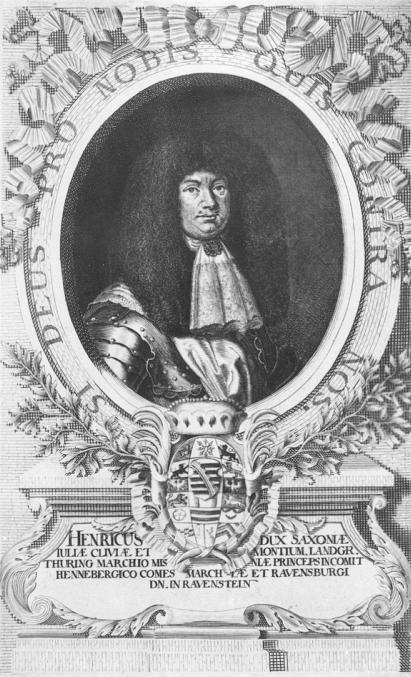
Duke Henry of Saxe-Römhild - bust in armor with wig, head scarf and shoulder sash at Oval, with its motto Si Deus pro nobis, quis contra nos? (Latin for "If God be for us, who can be against us?") and large coat of arms with princely hat, and a console with ornaments, engraving by Peter Schenk the Elder, now in the Kupferstichkabinett, State Art Collections Dresden, Dresden

He was born in Gotha as the seventh but fourth surviving son of Ernest I the Pious of Saxe-Gotha and Elisabeth Sophie of Saxe-Altenburg. After the death of their father, in 1675, Henry and his brothers co-ruled the duchy of Saxe-Gotha-Altenburg. On 24 February 1680, after the treaty of division of the family lands with his brothers, he received Saxe-Römhild, which consisted of the cities of Römhild, Königsberg (now in Bavaria), Themar, Behrungen and Milz and the fiefdom of Echter.

In Darmstadt on 1 March 1676, Henry married Marie Elisabeth of Hesse-Darmstadt, a daughter of Louis VI of Hesse-Darmstadt. Marie Elisabeth's nineteen pregnancies by Henry resulted in ten miscarriages and nine infant deaths; all of their children born alive went on to die within a day.

From 18 November 1680, Henry and his young wife Marielies lived in what they called Glücksburg castle in Römhild. Duke Henry unfolded brisk construction activity. He had his castle remodeled and rebuilt according to his wishes. During his rule the castle church was built, and a customs house, and four houses for the court nobility, plus a riding school, a racetrack and the Orangerie. Among the more magnificent structures were a cave house named Marie Elisabeth Delight, named after his wife, whom he loved very much, and a pleasure palace in Mertzelbach, designed by the court sculptor Lux, who also created the high altar in the Abbey Church. Many of these buildings no longer exist, but Henry described them in detail in his book The Princely desire to build of Duke Henry of Saxe-Römhild, which he published himself. This book is considered one of the few remaining contemporary testimonies on ephemeral architecture. Henry also had Lake Bürgersee drained and converted it into a pleasure garden. He equipped the city church with a Baroque high altar, an ornate royal box and a new organ.

Henry was knowledgeable in mechanics, architecture and mathematics. He maintained a princely library at Schloss Glücksburg, which he expanded steadily. After Henry's death, it was inherited by the Duke of Saxe-Gotha.

From 1691 to 1693, Henry served as regent for Duke Frederick II of Saxe-Gotha-Altenburg, jointly with his brother Bernhard. He had entered imperial military service at a young age and rose to the rank of Imperial Generalfeldzeugmeister in 1697. In 1698, he was awarded the prestigious Order of the Elephant. During the final four years of his life, he was the senior member of the Ernestine branch of the House of Wettin.

The luxurious life at court and the court of the duke's representative brought the small country town of Römhild to economic recovery and cultural prosperity. The expenditure exceeded the financial strength of the Duke by far. When the popular ruler died unexpectedly in 1710, he left behind significant debts; his inheritance was auctioned.

Henry died at Römhild. His marriage did not produce any surviving children, so the Ernestine sideline of Römhild died out with his death. After his death, his lands were disputed between his brothers. Eventually, Römhild was retained by his younger brother, John Ernest. The principality was divided in the Coburg-Eisenberg-Römhild inheritance dispute, which was settled in 1735.

Duke Henry was buried in the Altar Hall of Römhild church. Today, there is no inscription and no more grave marker.

== Ancestors ==
Ancestors of Henry, Duke of Saxe-Römhild

8. Johann Wilhelm, Duke of Saxe-Weimar
4. John II, Duke of Saxe-Weimar
9. Dorothea Susanne of Simmern
2. Ernest I, Duke of Saxe-Gotha
10. Joachim Ernst, Prince of Anhalt
5. Dorothea Maria of Anhalt
11. Eleonore of Württemberg
1. Henry, Duke of Saxe-Römhild
12. Frederick William I, Duke of Saxe-Weimar
6. Johann Philipp, Duke of Saxe-Altenburg
13. Anna Maria of the Palatinate-Neuburg
3. Princess Elisabeth Sophie of Saxe-Altenburg
14. Henry Julius, Duke of Brunswick-Lüneburg
7. Elisabeth of Braunschweig-Wolfenbüttel
15. Elizabeth of Denmark

Henry, Duke of Saxe-Römhild House of Wettin (Ernestine branch) Born: 19 November 1650 Died: 13 May 1710
Preceded by Ernst of Saxe-Gotha	Duke of Saxe-Römhild; 1675–1710	Succeeded by John Ernest IV of Saxe-Coburg-Saalfeld
