= Philip of Hesse-Darmstadt =

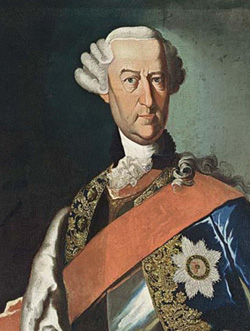
- Portrait c. 1830
- Born: 20 July 1671; Darmstadt, Landgraviate of Hesse-Darmstadt, Holy Roman Empire
- Died: 11 August 1736 (aged 65); Vienna, Austria
- Spouse: Princess Marie Ernestine of Croÿ
- Issue: Joseph, Prince-Bishop of Augsburg; Princess Theodora of Hesse-Darmstadt; Prince Leopold of Hesse-Darmstadt
- House: Hesse-Darmstadt
- Father: Louis VI, Landgrave of Hesse-Darmstadt
- Mother: Elisabeth Dorothea of Saxe-Gotha-Altenburg

Philip of Hesse-Darmstadt (20 July 1671 in Darmstadt – 11 August 1736 in Vienna) was a Prince of Hesse-Darmstadt, Imperial Field marshal and Governor of Mantua.

== Life ==
Philip was a younger son of Louis VI, Landgrave of Hesse-Darmstadt (1630–1678) and his second wife Princess Elisabeth Dorothea of Saxe-Gotha-Altenburg (1640–1709), daughter of Ernest I, Duke of Saxe-Gotha, and Princess Elisabeth Sophie of Saxe-Altenburg.

Philip fought for the Habsburgs in the Spanish War of Succession and became in 1708 Field Marshal and Supreme Commander of the Imperial troops in newly conquered Naples. After the war in 1714, under influence of Prince Eugene of Savoy, he became governor of the former Duchy of Mantua until his death.

Philip was a great lover of music. When he commanded the Austrian Army in Naples, he was patron of Nicola Porpora, and when he was governor of Mantua, he made Antonio Vivaldi Maestro di Cappella of his court. Vivaldi wrote the opera Tito Manlio in Philip's honor.

== Marriage and issue ==
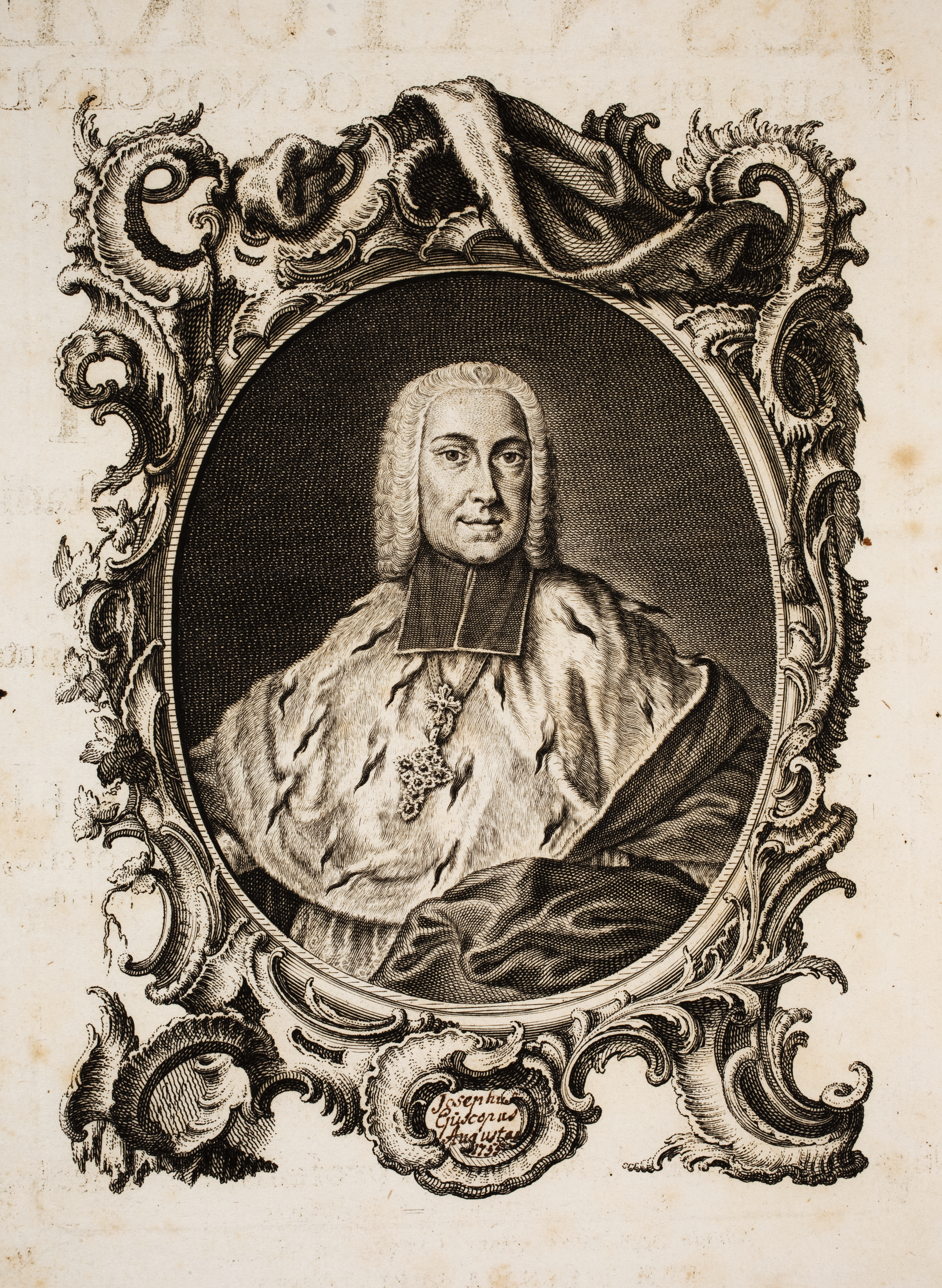
Joseph Ignaz Philipp von Hessen-Darmstadt, bishop of Augsburg, son of Philip marshal in Austria.

On 24 March 1693, in Brussels, Philip married Princess Marie Ernestine of Croÿ (1673–1714), daughter of Duke Ferdinand Joseph of Croy-Havré (1644-1694) and his wife, Countess Marie Joséphine Barbe van Halewijn de Hames (d. 1713). For this marriage, he converted to Catholicism, despite heavy protest of his mother.
They had 5 children :

- Joseph (13 January, 1699 − 20 August, 1768), Prince-Bishop of Augsburg
- Wilhelm Ludwig (6 July, 1704 - 24 July, 1704) Died in infancy
- Theodora (6 February 1706 – 23 January 1784), married in 1727 Duke Antonio Ferrante Gonzaga of Guastalla (1687–1729), no issue.
- Leopold (11 April, 1708– 27 October, 1764), Imperial Field marshal, married in 1740 Princess Enrichetta d'Este of Modena (1702–1777). They had no issue.
- Charles (23 April, 1710 - 17 June, 1710) Died young

== Literature ==
- Andreas Räss: Die Convertiten seit der Reformation S. 467 ff.
- Alfred Arneth: Prinz Eugen von Savoyen, Wien, 1864
- Alessandro Cont, La Chiesa dei principi. Le relazioni tra Reichskirche, dinastie sovrane tedesche e stati italiani (1688-1763), preface of Elisabeth Garms-Cornides, Trento, Provincia autonoma di Trento, 2018, pp. 159–165, https://www.academia.edu/38170694/La_Chiesa_dei_principi._Le_relazioni_tra_Reichskirche_dinastie_sovrane_tedesche_e_stati_italiani_1688-1763_prefazione_di_Elisabeth_Garms-Cornides_Trento_Provincia_autonoma_di_Trento_2018
