= Elisabeth Dorothea of Saxe-Gotha-Altenburg =

- Landgravine consort of Hesse-Darmstadt
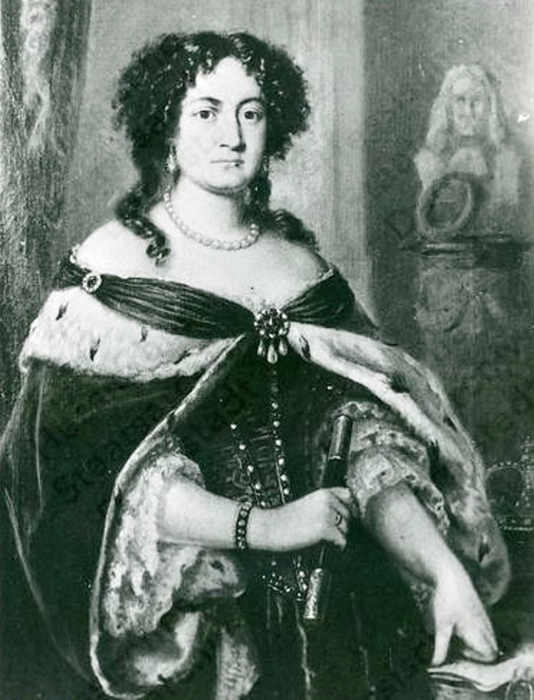
- Portrait c. 1680
- Born: 8 January 1640; Coburg
- Died: 24 August 1709 (aged 69); Butzbach
- Spouse: Louis VI, Landgrave of Hesse-Darmstadt (m. 1666; died 1678)
- Issue: Ernest Louis, Landgrave of Hesse-Darmstadt; Prince George; Sophie Louise, Princess of Oettingen-Oettingen; Prince Philip; Prince Johann; Prince Heinrich; Elisabeth Dorothea, Landgravine of Hesse-Homburg; Prince Friedrich
- House: House of Wettin
- Father: Ernest I, Duke of Saxe-Gotha
- Mother: Princess Elisabeth Sophie of Saxe-Altenburg

Elisabeth Dorothea of Saxe-Gotha-Altenburg (8 January 1640 – 24 August 1709) was a German regent. She was a Landgravine of Hesse-Darmstadt by her marriage to Louis VI, Landgrave of Hesse-Darmstadt and Regent of Hesse-Darmstadt during the minority of her son from 1678 to 1688.

== Early life ==
Elisabeth Dorothea was the eldest daughter and eldest surviving child of Ernest I, Duke of Saxe-Gotha and Elisabeth Sophie, the only daughter of John Philip, Duke of Saxe-Altenburg.

Six years after her marriage, her father inherited the Duchy of Saxe-Altenburg and assumed new arms and titles.

== Landgravine ==
On 5 December 1666, Elisabeth Dorothea married Louis VI, Landgrave of Hesse-Darmstadt at Schloss Friedenstein at Gotha. The groom was a close friend of her brother Prince Frederick and a widowed father of six children who had lost his first wife just under a year and a half before. Elisabeth Dorothea bore her husband eight further children, two daughters and six sons, in just 11 years; one died in infancy, and another was killed in battle ten months before her own death.

Landgrave Louis VI died on 24 April 1678 and was succeeded by the eldest son of his first marriage, Louis VII, who reigned only 18 weeks and 4 days before dying of dysentery on 31 August 1678 in Gotha.

== Regent ==
Like his father, Louis VII designated his stepmother as regent of Hesse-Darmstadt in his will. The Imperial Court (Reichskammergericht) demanded that she reign jointly with a group of councillors led by Weiprecht von Gemmingen, but the politically wise and energetic Elisabeth prevented them from taking their oaths; this relegated them to the position of advisors and allowed her free rein. Darmstadt flourished under her rule.

On the death of William Christoph, Landgrave of Hesse-Homburg in 1681, Elisabeth Dorothea successfully challenged the Homburg branch of the family over ownership of Bingenheim Castle, claiming that the area rightfully belonged to the Darmstadt branch because it had been given to Princess Sophia Eleonore of Hesse-Darmstadt as a dowry when she married William Christoph, Landgrave of Hesse-Homburg.

After her son attained his majority in 1688, she retired to her dower lands in Butzbach but offered her help in the government to her son, who refused. She died in Butzbach in 1709.

Elisabeth Dorothea kept a diary that covers 52 volumes and has been preserved without gaps since 1667. It is one of the most extensive diary projects by a dynastic personality that describes politics and court life, and is considered a valuable view into the world of the German courts.

== Ancestry ==
Ancestors of Elisabeth Dorothea of Saxe-Gotha-Altenburg

8. Johann Wilhelm, Duke of Saxe-Weimar
4. John II, Duke of Saxe-Weimar
9. Dorothea Susanne of Simmern
2. Ernest I, Duke of Saxe-Gotha
10. Joachim Ernest, Prince of Anhalt
5. Dorothea Maria of Anhalt
11. Eleonore of Württemberg
1. Elisabeth Dorothea of Saxe-Gotha-Altenburg
12. Frederick Wilhelm I, Duke of Saxe-Weimar
6. Johann Philipp, Duke of Saxe-Altenburg
13. Anna Maria of the Palatinate-Neuburg
3. Elisabeth Sophie of Saxe-Altenburg
14. Henry Julius, Duke of Brunswick-Lüneburg
7. Elisabeth of Brünswick-Wolfenbüttel
15. Elizabeth of Denmark

== Bibliography ==
- Puppel Pauline, Die Regentin p. 279.
- Curtius Michael Conrad, Geschichte ... von Hessen p. 257.
- Roloff Hans Gert, Chloe - Beihefte zum Daphnis Bd. 25 Editiondesiderate der frühen Neuzeit Editions Rodopi B. V., Amsterdam.

Vacant Title last held by Maria Elisabeth of Holstein-Gottorp	Landgravine consort of Hesse-Darmstadt; 1666–1678	Vacant Title next held by Dorothea Charlotte of Brandenburg-Ansbach
