= Friedrich von Hessen-Darmstadt (1677–1708) =

Friedrich von Hessen-Darmstadt (18 September 1677, Darmstadt – 13 October 1708, Chavusy) was a prince of Hesse-Darmstadt and Russian General.

Frederick was the youngest son of Landgrave Louis VI. of Hesse-Darmstadt (1630–1678) and Elisabeth Dorothea of Saxe-Gotha-Altenburg (1640–1709). Frederick entered service in Rome 1697, like his three older brothers George, Philip and Henry, in protest of his mother, a zealous Protestant. Later he entered the Russian service under Peter the Great and was appointed Lieutenant-General of the cavalry. He participated, along with Peter, in the battle of Lesnaya against the Swedes, where he was mortally wounded during a musket exchange. Friedrich was brought to Chavusy in order to recover but died there on 13 October 1708, four days after the battle. Frederick had contributed significantly to the victory of the battle and was permitted the completion of a Catholic church during his burial, by Tsar Peter I.

== Literature ==
- Andreas Räss: Die Convertiten seit der Reformation pp. 468
- Carl Friedrich Günther. Anekdoten, Charakterschilderungen und Denkwürdigkeiten aus der Hessischen ... pp. 154
