= Millones =

The millones were an indirect tax on food in Spain in the 16th and 17th centuries. They were first imposed by Philip II and were approved by the Cortes de Castilla 4 April 1590. The tax was initially intended in 1590 as a temporary measure to replace the Spanish Armada, which had been lost in attacking England. The millones was voted by the Cortes of Castille in 1590 as a 6-year grant for 8 million ducats. It was originally levied on the cuatro especies of wine, meat, olive oil and vinegar. The tax was renewed by the Cortes in 1596 and was used also by Philip's successors Philip III, Philip IV and Charles II. Under Philip III, the tax brought in 3 million ducats a year, but that fell back to 2 million ducats a year because of population loss and recession at the end of his reign. In 1626, Philip IV and his Cortes doubled the tax to the level of 4 million ducats by also levying it on salt, paper and ship anchorage in lieu of proposed taxes on offices, grants and property; in the Cortes of 1632, the tax raised an additional 2.5 million ducats a year because it was levied on chocolate, sugar, fish, tobacco and other commodities. From 1655, renewal of the tax was practically automatic, and from 1668, it was renewed by the Junta de asistentes, which the king called together in lieu of bringing together the full Cortes.

The complex system was later simplified by adding so-called cientos (hundredths) as a surcharge on another sales tax, the alcabala.

The tax burden was a factor in the impoverishment of the Castilian populace in the 17th century because it increased the prices of the most basic goods. Unlike direct taxes, it fell on the nobility as well as the common people, but as can be imagined, a tax on basic foodstuffs was extremely regressive.
