= Auguste Magdalene of Hessen-Darmstadt =

Auguste Magdalene of Hesse-Darmstadt
- Born: 6 March 1657; Darmstadt
- Died: 1 September 1674 (aged 17); Darmstadt
- Father: Louis VI of Hesse-Darmstadt
- Mother: Maria Elisabeth of Holstein-Gottorp

Auguste Magdalene of Hesse-Darmstadt (6 March 1657, Darmstadt – 1 September 1674, Darmstadt) was a German noblewoman and poet.

== Life ==
Auguste Magdalene was a daughter of Count Louis VI of Hesse-Darmstadt (1630–1678) from his marriage to Maria Elisabeth of Holstein-Gottorp (1634–1665), a daughter of Duke Frederick III of Holstein-Gottorp.

Like her father and her sister Magdalene Sibylle, she was active as a writer. She translated the Psalms of David into German verse and wrote a poetry collection entitled The door to German poetry. She died only 17 years old and was buried in the City Church in Darmstadt.
