= Behrungen =

Coordinates: 50°25′N 10°25′E

Behrungen (German pronunciation: [ˈbeːʁʊŋən]) is a former municipality in the district Schmalkalden-Meiningen, in Thuringia, Germany. Since December 1, 2007, it has been part of the Grabfeld district.

== Gallery ==
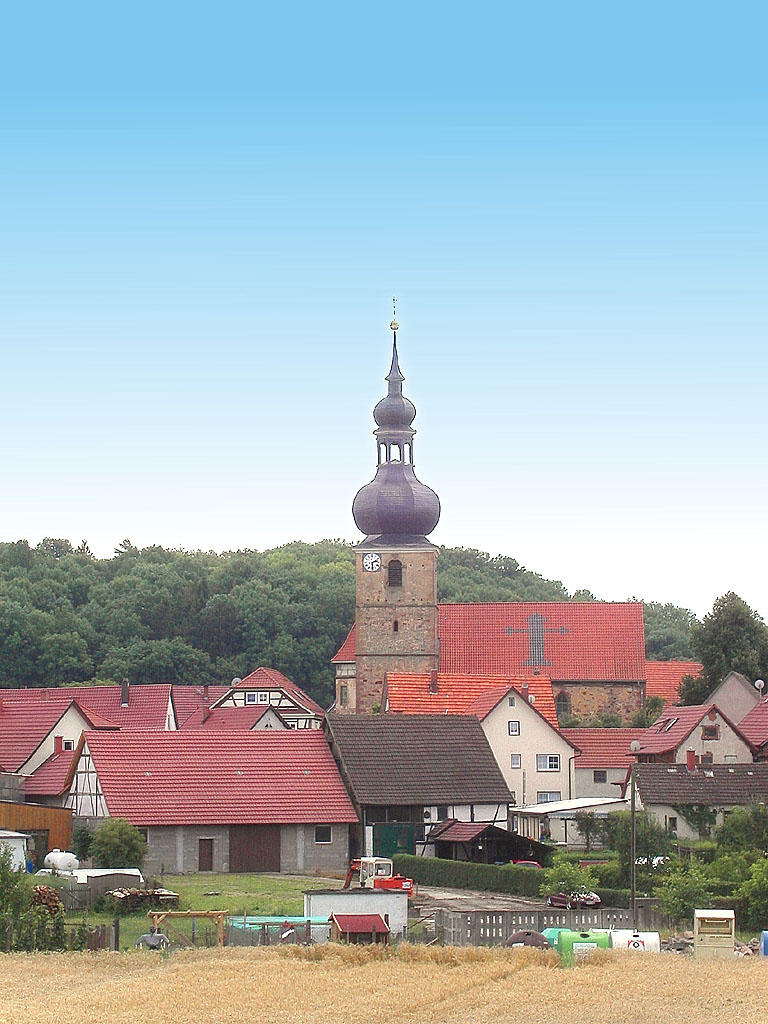
Village church

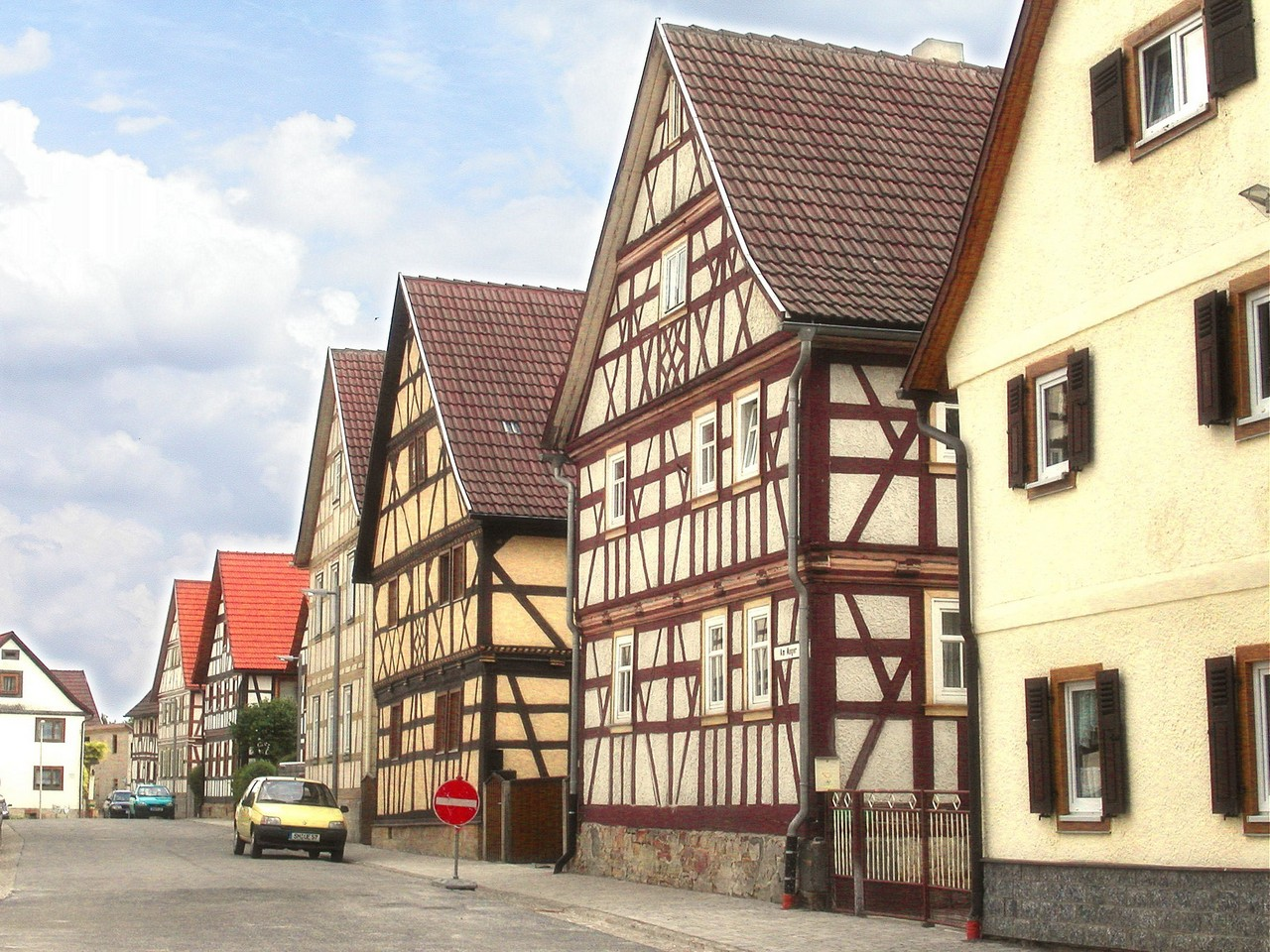
Houses at the 'Manger'

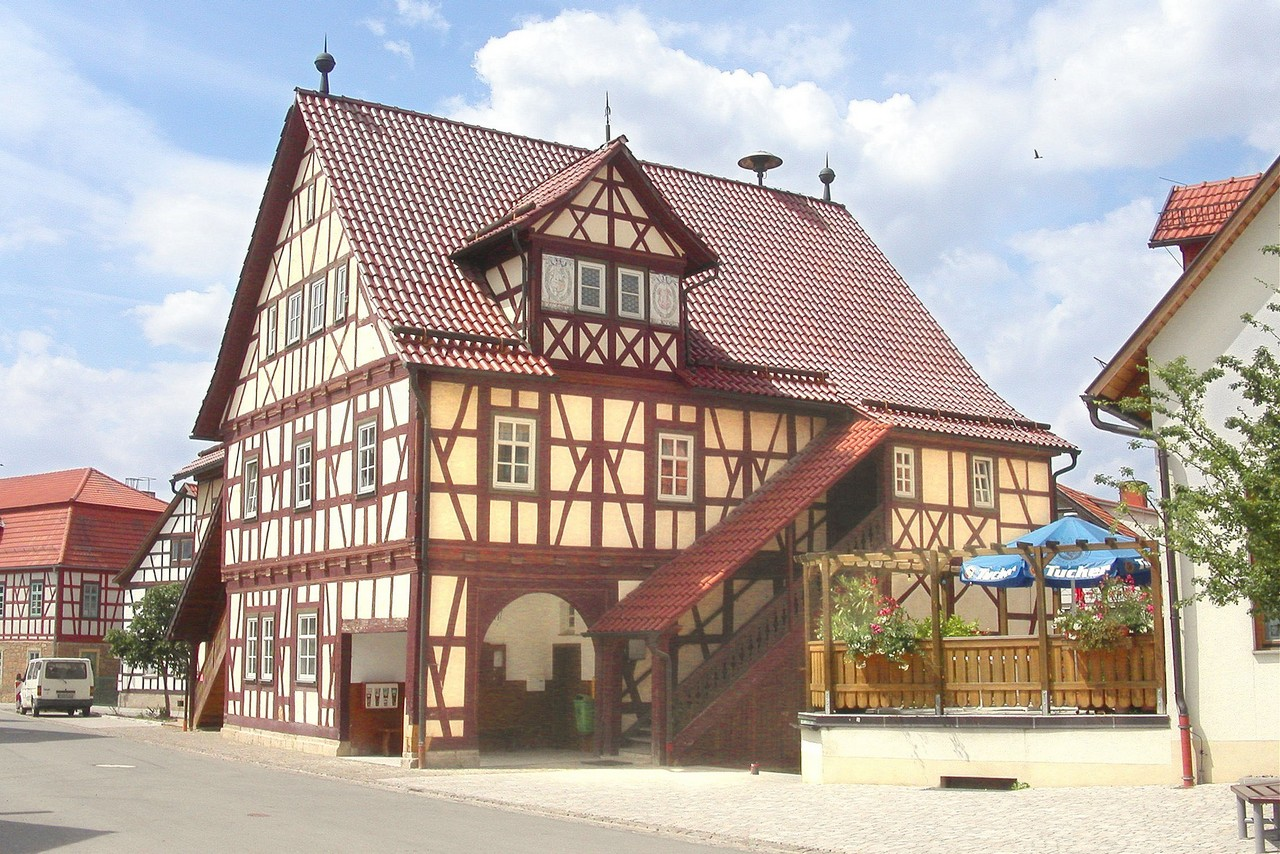
Town hall

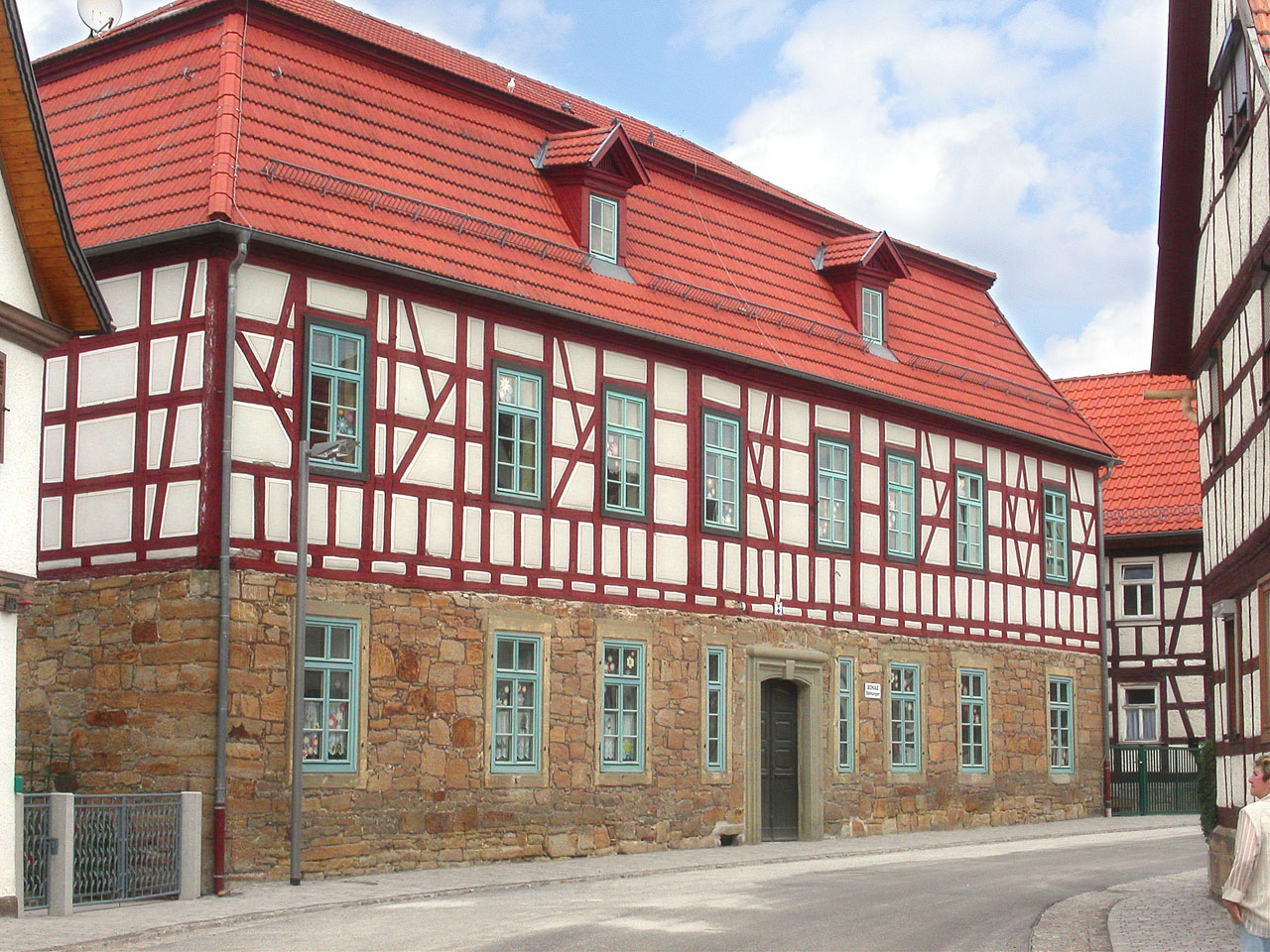
Primary school

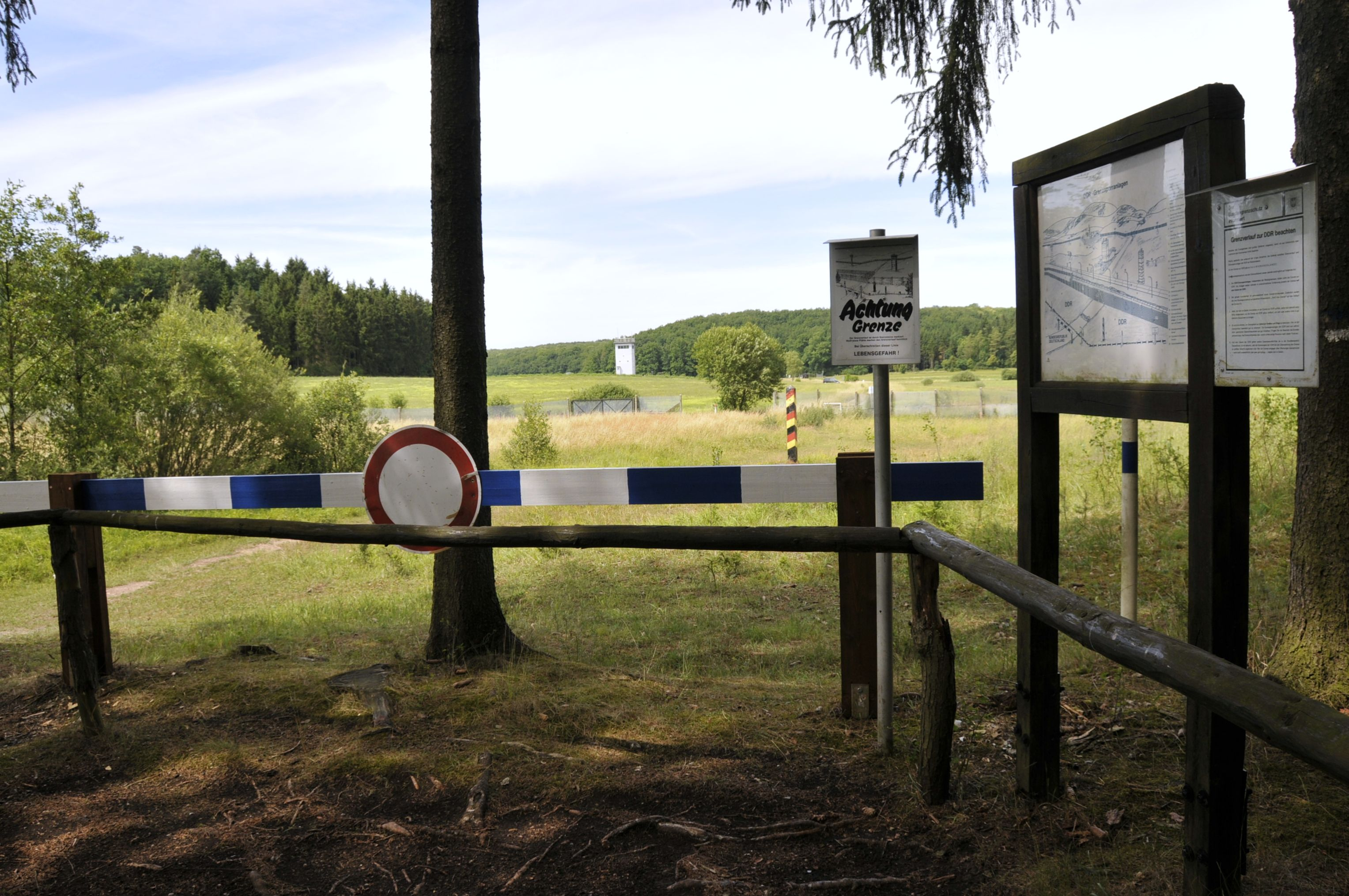
Former frontier to GDR

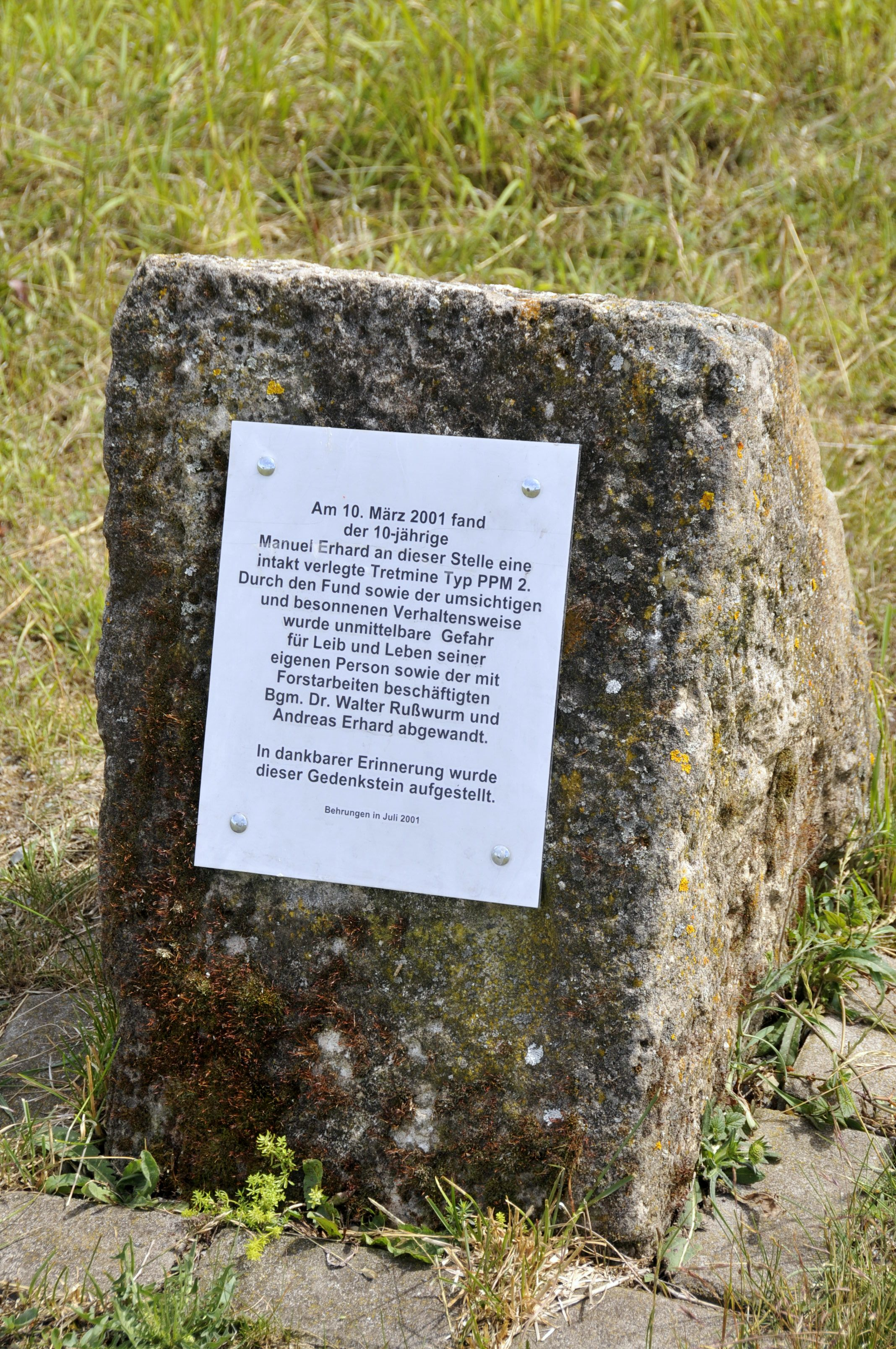
Memorial for border fortification
