= Joseph Denis =

Joseph Denis (baptismal name Jacques) (6 November 1657, at Trois-Rivières, Canada – 25 January 1736) was a Canadian Récollet priest.

== Life ==
He was the first Canadian to join the Recollects of the Friars Minor. His father, Pierre Denis de la Ronde and his mother Catherine Leneuf de la Poterie, were natives of Normandy. In 1669 he entered the seminary at Quebec and on 9 May 1677, joined the Recollects in the same city, taking in religion the name of Joseph.

When professed he went to France to study theology. After being ordained he returned to Canada in 1682, where in 1685, he completed the installation of the Recollects at Ile Percée. He founded the house of the order at Plaisance in 1689 and that at Montreal in 1692.

After holding the office of provincial commissary, superior of the convent of Quebec, and master of novices, in 1709 he was named superior of the Recollects and parish priest of Three Rivers, where he rebuilt the old church in stone.

In 1719 he carried to France, to be forwarded to Rome, the Acts of Brother Didace (Les actes du tres-religieux Frere Didace), a Canadian Recollect whose confessor he was for many years. He died shortly after his return to New France.
