= Barthold Nihus =

German Roman Catholic bishop (1590–1657)

Barthold Nihus, OPraem (born on 7 February 1590, Holtorf, Hanover, now Germany – died on 10 March 1657, Erfurt, now Germany) was a Catholic convert, a German Catholic bishop and controversialist. He was born in the Duchy of Brunswick-Lüneburg.

== Biography ==
Barthold Nihus was born on 7 February 1590 at Holtorfe at Hanover in a poor Lutheran Protestant family. He received his primary education at Verdun and Goslar, and in 1607 he studied philosophy and medicine at the University of Helmstedt. After obtaining a master's degree in philosophy in 1612 Nihus began studying Protestant theology. In 1616, along with two students from aristocratic families moved to the University of Jena. Later, he became a teacher of the princes of Saxony-Weimar Duchy. Inability of Protestant theologians on the major issues of faith caused him to doubt the truth of Protestantism. In 1622, Berthold Niehus moved to Cologne, where he visited the house of proselytes, founded the Brotherhood of the Holy Cross. In the same year he was received into the Catholic Church. After his conversion to Catholicism Niehus sent letters to professors Georg Calixtus and Konrad Hornejus in which he explained his reasons for joining the Catholic Church. The main motive of the treatment was the need for the Chief Justice, which could explain the Bible and put an end to theological debate and controversy, and so the judge in his opinion is the Bishop of Rome. In 1629 he became the abbot of the monastery of Premonstratensian, from which he was expelled, along with the monks, by the Protestants after the Battle of Breitenfeld in 1631. Berthold was running in Hildesheim, where he became a canon of the Church of the Holy Cross, where later moved to Holland, where he met with Gerhard Vossius. In 1645 was caused by the papal nuncio Fabio Chigi in Munster, where he was to participate in the World Peace of Westphalia. A few years later he moved to Mainz, where he entered the service of the Bishop Johann Philipp von Schönborn, on whose behalf in 1654 went to Ingolstadt to collect information about the institute of diocesan priests, headed by Bartholomew Holzhauser. In 1655 Schoenborn appointed him suffragan bishop of Saxony and Thuringia, with headquarters in Erfurt, where he died on 10 March 1657.

== Works ==
- Ars nova, dicto S. Scripturae unico e lucrandi Pontificiis plurimos in partes Lutheranorum, Detecta non Nihil et suggesta Theologis Helmstetensibus, Georgio Calixto et praesertim Conrado Hornejo (Hildesheim, 1633).
- Apologeticus Pro Arte Nova Contra Andabatam Helmstetensem (Cologne, 1640),
- Hypodigma, Quo diluuntur nonnulla Contra Catholicos disputata in Cornelii Martini tractatu de analysi logica (Cologne, 1648).
