= Louis VI of Hesse-Darmstadt =

Louis VI
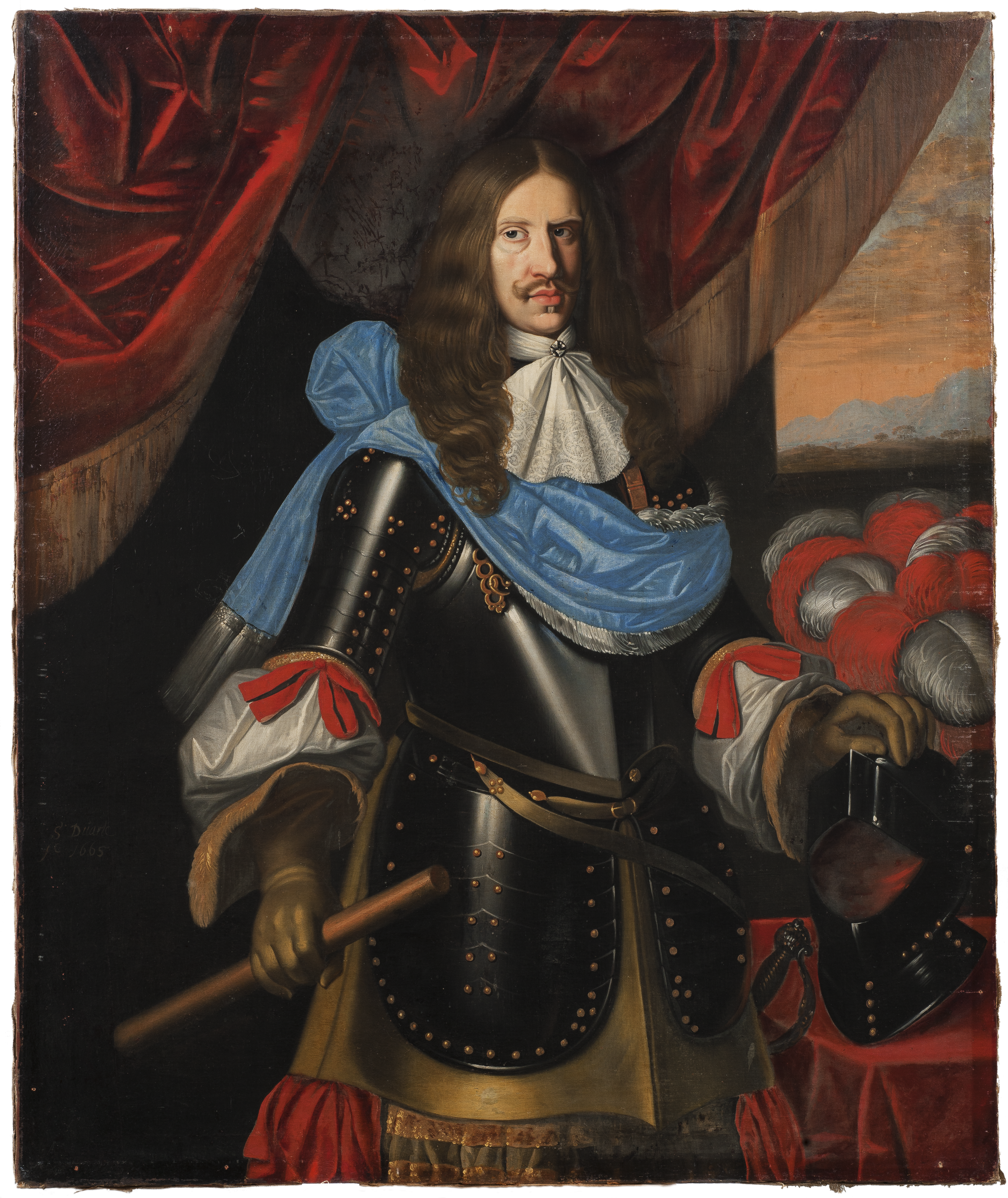
- 1665 portrait

Landgrave of Hesse-Darmstadt
- Reign: 11 June 1661 – 24 April 1678
- Predecessor: George II
- Successor: Louis VII
- Born: 25 January 1630; Darmstadt
- Died: 24 April 1678 (aged 48); Darmstadt
- Spouse: Maria Elisabeth of Holstein-Gottorp (m. 1650; died 1665) Elisabeth Dorothea of Saxe-Gotha-Altenburg (m. 1666)
- Issue: Magdalene Sybilla, Duchess of Württemberg; Princess Sophie Eleonore; Prince George; Marie Elisabeth, Duchess of Saxe-Römhild; Princess Auguste Magdalene; Louis VII, Landgrave of Hesse-Darmstadt; Prince Friedrich; Sophie Marie, Duchess of Saxe-Eisenberg; Ernest Louis, Landgrave of Hesse-Darmstadt; Prince George; Sophie Louise, Princess of Oettingen-Oettingen; Prince Philip; Prince Johann; Prince Heinrich; Elisabeth Dorothea, Landgravine of Hesse-Homburg; Prince Friedrich
- House: Hesse-Darmstadt
- Father: George II, Landgrave of Hesse-Darmstadt
- Mother: Sophia Eleonore of Saxony

Louis VI of Hesse-Darmstadt (German: Ludwig) (25 January 1630 – 24 April 1678) was Landgrave of Hesse-Darmstadt from 1661 to 1678.

He was the eldest of three sons of the Landgrave George II of Hesse-Darmstadt and Sophia Eleonore of Saxony.

== Marriage and children ==
Louis VI was married twice.

On 24 November 1650 he married his first cousin Maria Elisabeth of Schleswig-Holstein-Gottorp (1634–1665), daughter of his maternal uncle Frederick III, Duke of Holstein-Gottorp. They had eight children:

- Magdalene Sybille (28 April 1652–11 August 1712) a renowned composer of baroque churchsongs; she married Duke William Louis of Württemberg.
- Sophie Eleonore (19 January 1653 - 21 August 1653), died in infancy.
- George (3 July 1654 –1 August 1655), died in infancy.
- Marie Elisabeth (1656–1715) married in 1676 Duke Henry of Saxe-Römhild.
- Auguste Magdalene (1657–1674), died young.
- Louis (22 June 1658–31 August 1678), his successor (Louis VII).
- Frederick (1 October 1659 – 28 January 1676), died young.
- Sophie Marie (1661–1712) married in 1681 Duke Christian of Saxe-Eisenberg (1653–1707).

On 5 December 1666 he married Elisabeth Dorothea of Saxe-Gotha-Altenburg (1640–1709), daughter of Ernest I, Duke of Saxe-Gotha. They also had eight children.

- Ernst Louis (1667–1739), successor of his half-brother Louis VII who ruled for only 4 months
- Georg (1669–1705), renowned Field Marshal, killed in Barcelona
- Sophie Louise (6 July 1670 – 2 June 1758), married Prince Albert Ernest II of Oettingen-Oettingen (1669–1731)
- Philip (1671–1736), Imperial Field Marshal and governor of Mantua, married in 1693 Princess Marie Therese of Croy (1673–1714); Princess Enrichetta d'Este was their daughter-in-law
- Johann (3 June 1672 – 26 August 1673), died in infancy.
- Heinrich (26 September 1674 – 31 January 1741), was a general, never married and had no issue.
- Elisabeth Dorothea (24 April 1676 – 9 September 1721), married Frederick III Jakob of Hessen-Homburg (1673–1746)
- Frederick (18 September 1677 – 13 October 1708), killed in battle. Married morganatically and had issue.

== Ancestors ==
Ancestors of Louis VI of Hesse-Darmstadt

8. George I, Landgrave of Hesse-Darmstadt
4. Louis V, Landgrave of Hesse-Darmstadt
9. Magdalene of Lippe
2. George II, Landgrave of Hesse-Darmstadt
10. John George, Elector of Brandenburg
5. Magdalene of Brandenburg
11. Elisabeth of Anhalt-Zerbst
1. Louis VI, Landgrave of Hesse-Darmstadt
12. Christian I, Elector of Saxony
6. John George I, Elector of Saxony
13. Sophie of Brandenburg
3. Sophia Eleonore of Saxony
14. Albert Frederick, Duke of Prussia
7. Magdalene Sibylle of Prussia
15. Marie Eleonore of Cleves

Louis VI of Hesse-Darmstadt House of Hesse Born: 25 January 1630 Died: 24 April 1678
Regnal titles
Preceded by George II	Landgrave of Hesse-Darmstadt; 1661–1678	Succeeded by Louis VII
