= Louis VII of Hesse-Darmstadt =

Louis VII
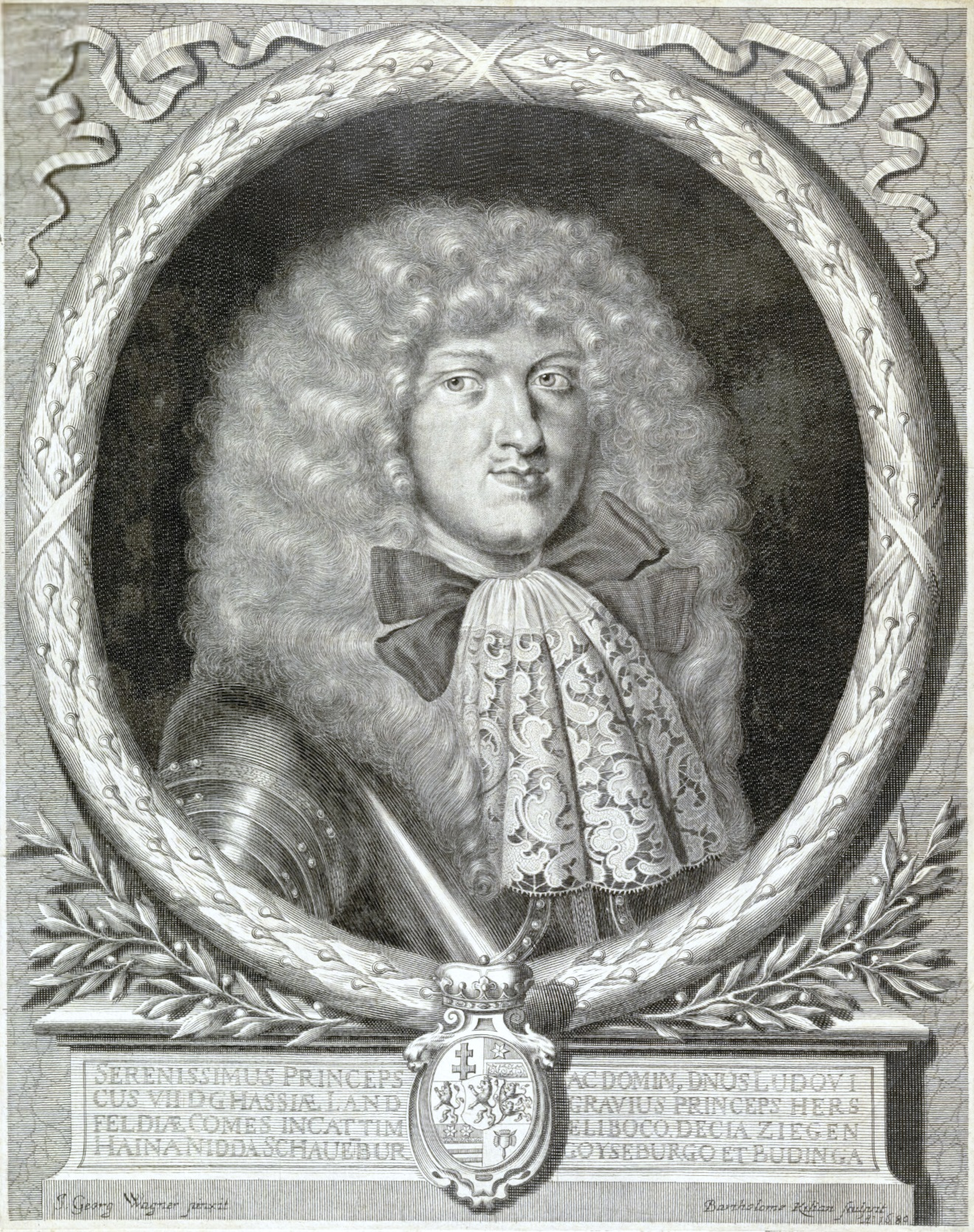
- Engraving c. 1678

Landgrave of Hesse-Darmstadt
- Reign: 24 April 1678 – 31 August 1678
- Predecessor: Louis VI
- Successor: Ernest Louis
- Born: 22 June 1658; Darmstadt
- Died: 31 August 1678 (aged 20); Gotha
- House: House of Hesse-Darmstadt
- Father: Louis VI, Landgrave of Hesse-Darmstadt
- Mother: Maria Elisabeth of Holstein-Gottorp

Louis VII (22 June 1658 – 31 August 1678) was Landgrave of Hesse-Darmstadt from April 1678 until his death in August of that year.

== Early life ==
Louis VII was the son of Landgrave Louis VI of Hesse-Darmstadt and his wife Maria Elisabeth of Holstein-Gottorp.

== Reign ==
Following the death of his father, he began to reign as Landgrave on 24 April 1678. He reigned only 18 weeks and four days before he died from an infection on 31 August 1678.

== Ancestors ==
Ancestors of Louis VII of Hesse-Darmstadt

8. Louis V, Landgrave of Hesse-Darmstadt
4. George II, Landgrave of Hesse-Darmstadt
9. Magdalene of Brandenburg
2. Louis VI, Landgrave of Hesse-Darmstadt
10. John George I, Elector of Saxony (= 14)
5. Sophia Eleonore of Saxony
11. Duchess Magdalene Sibylle of Prussia (= 15)
1. Louis VII, Landgrave of Hesse-Darmstadt
12. John Adolf, Duke of Holstein-Gottorp
6. Frederick III, Duke of Holstein-Gottorp
13. Augusta of Denmark
3. Maria Elisabeth of Holstein-Gottorp
14. John George I, Elector of Saxony (= 10)
7. Duchess Marie Elisabeth of Saxony
15. Duchess Magdalene Sibylle of Prussia (= 11)

Louis VII of Hesse-Darmstadt House of Hesse Born: 22 June 1658 Died: 31 August 1678
Regnal titles
Preceded by Louis VI	Landgrave of Hesse-Darmstadt; 1678	Succeeded by Ernest Louis
