= LGBTQ culture in Berlin =

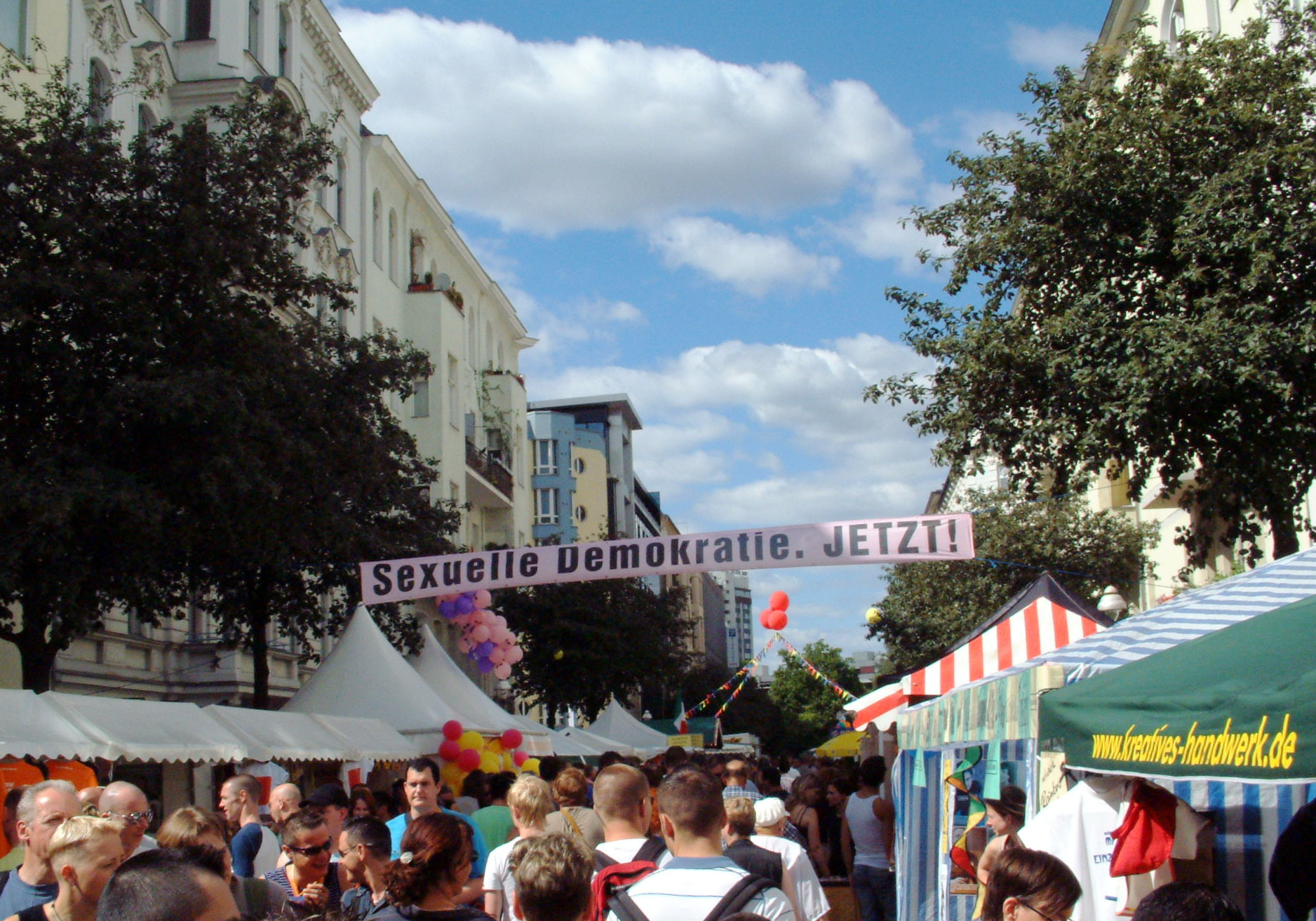
Lesbian and Gay City Festival in Schöneberg

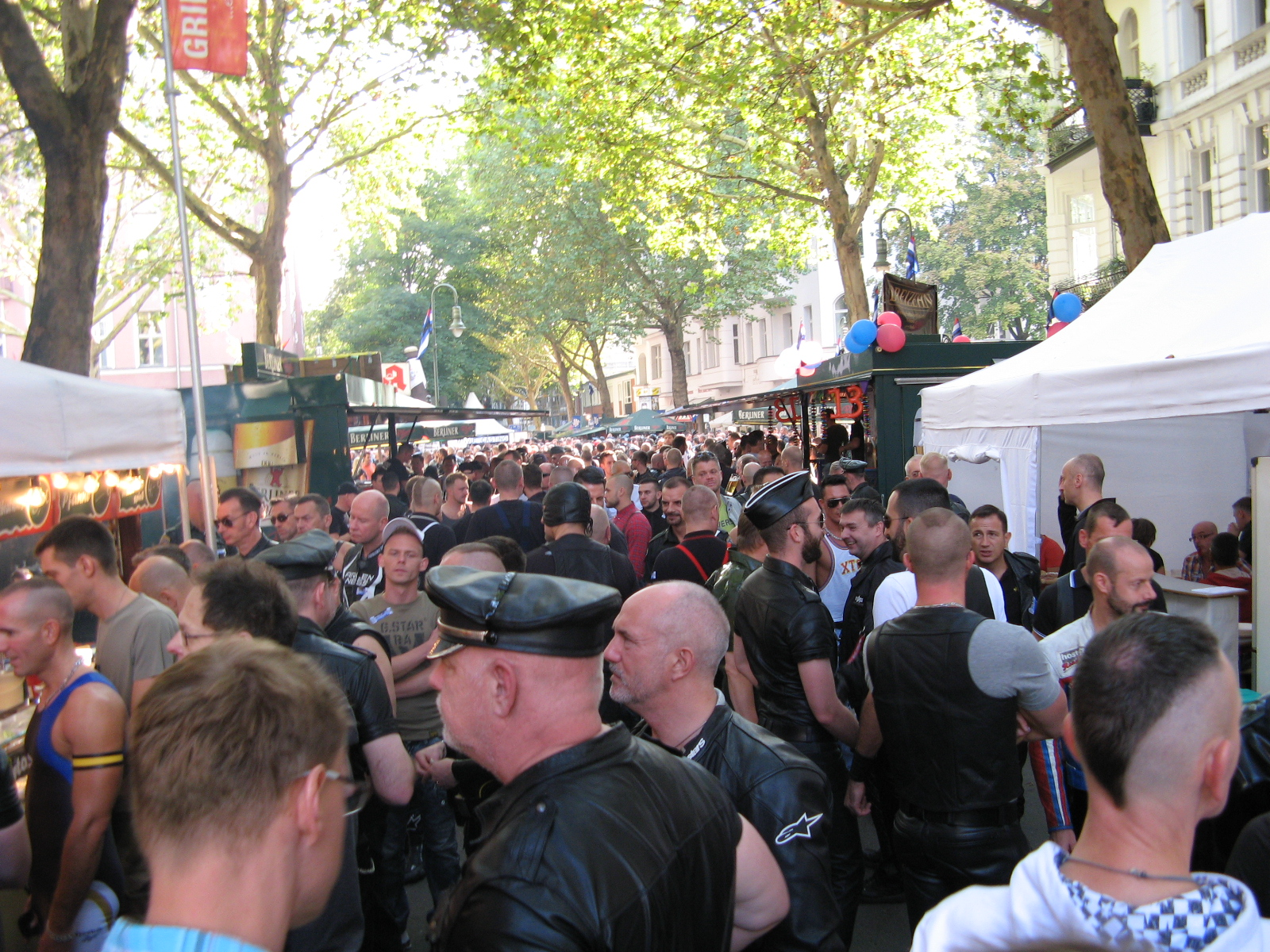
Folsom Europe

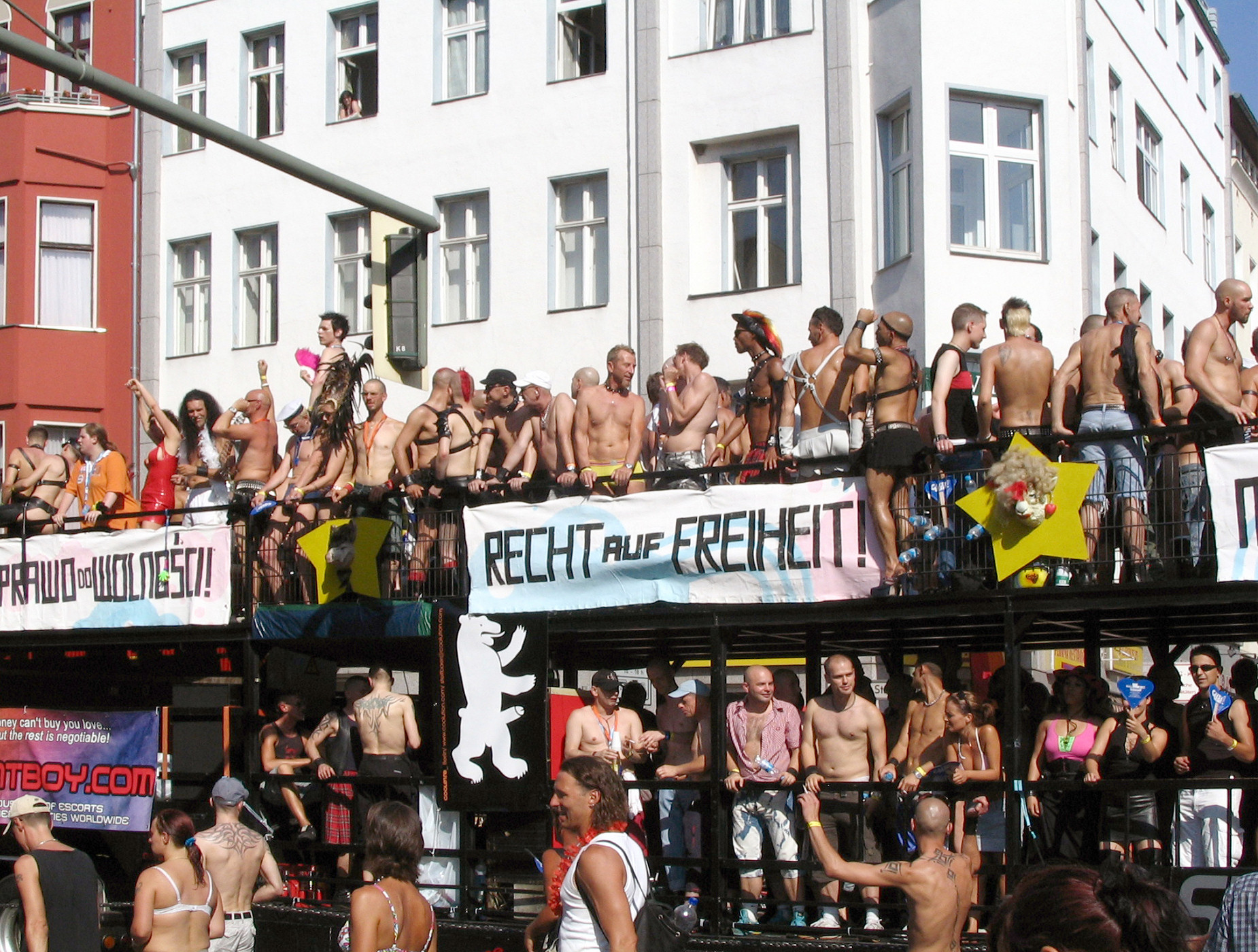
Berlin Pride

Berlin was the capital city of the German Empire from 1871 to 1945, its eastern part the de facto capital of East Germany from 1949 to 1990, and has been the capital of the unified Federal Republic of Germany since June 1991. Berlin has many LGBTQ-friendly districts, though the borough of Schöneberg is widely viewed by locals and visitors as Berlin's gayborhood. Particularly, the boroughs North-West near Nollendorfplatz identify as Berlin's "Regenbogenkiez" (Rainbow District), with a certain concentration of gay bars near and along Motzstraße and Fuggerstraße.

Many of the decisive events of what has become known as Germany's second LGBT movement (the first beginning roughly in the 1860s and ending abruptly in 1933) take place in the West Berlin boroughs of Charlottenburg, Schöneberg, and Kreuzberg beginning in 1971 with the formation of the Homosexuelle Aktion Westberlin (HAW). Whereas in East Berlin, the district of Prenzlauer Berg became synonymous with the East German LGBT movement, beginning in 1973 with the founding of the HIB (Homosexuelle Interessengemeinschaft Berlin). Schöneberg's gayborhood caters to, and is particularly popular with, gay men.

Berlin's large LGBTQ events, such as the Lesbian and Gay City Festival, Easter Berlin Leather and Fetish Week, Folsom Europe, and CSD, center around Schöneberg, with related events taking place city-wide during these events. Berlin's present-day neighborhoods with a certain concentration of LGBTQ-oriented culture vary somewhat in terms of history, demography, and where the emphasis in each neighborhoods' queer culture falls along the LGBTQ spectrum.

== History ==
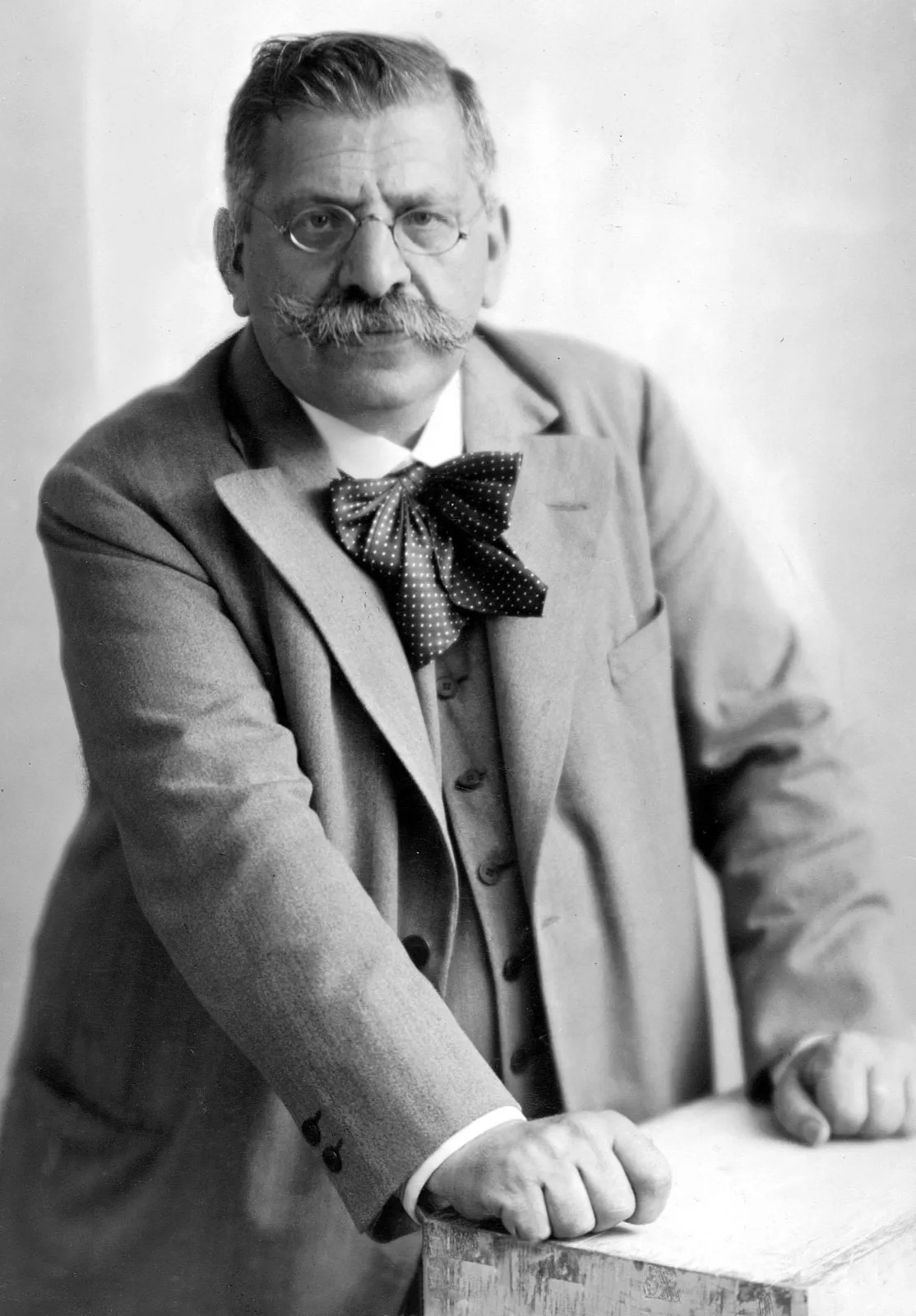
Magnus Hirschfeld

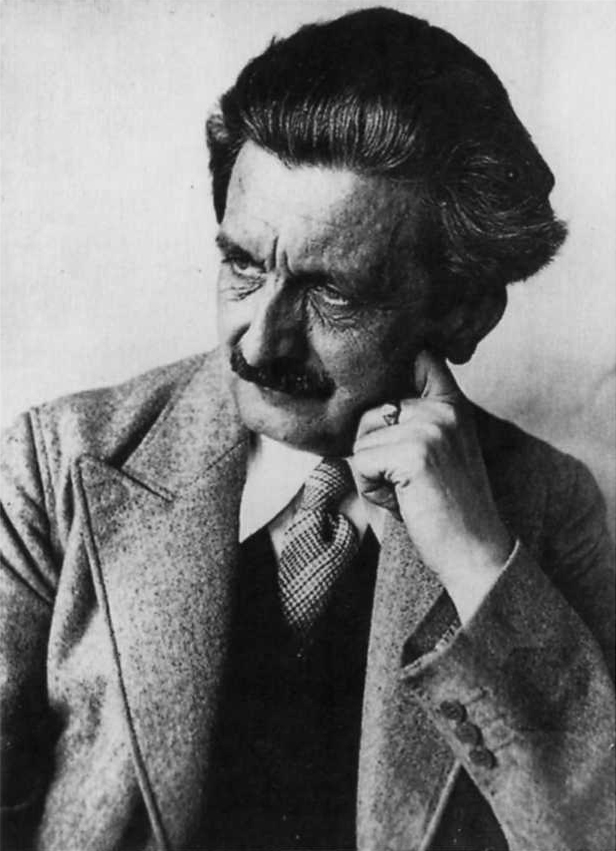
Adolf Brand

Berlin has a long history of LGBT culture and activism. By the 1920s, the city had a reputation for being relatively LGBT-friendly, at least among insiders. By that time, LGBT-oriented publications and organizations already existed in Berlin. The world's first gay magazine, Der Eigene (The Unique) by Adolf Brand was published in Berlin beginning in 1896.

Magnus Hirschfeld, a German physician, founded the Scientific-Humanitarian Committee (German: Wissenschaftlich-Humanitäres Kommittee (WHK)) in May 1897 in the context of his Institute for the Science of Sexuality. Though there are earlier German proponents of decriminalization and de-stigmatization of romantic love and sex between men (Karl Heinrich Ulrichs (1825-1895) is often mentioned in this context), the WHK was the first to do so in a collaborative and organized fashion. The Scientific-Humanitarian Committee was also the first not to concern itself only with men's sexuality and gender. The WHK took a liberal, scientific, and legalistic approach to what would now be called LGBT-activism. Hirschfeld and his peers used other terms at the time and viewed themselves as reformers. Men of letters and breeding like Hirschfeld or Ulrichs invented their own terms based on Greek mythology or scientific Latin.

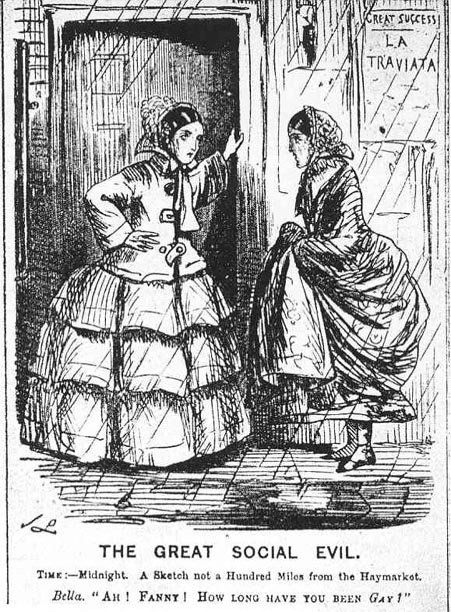
Etymology of the word "gay" (John Leech, Punch magazine, 1857)

Words like "gay" or its German counterpart "schwul" historically alluded to prostitution and things associated with it. Hirschfeld and his peers were, in their own minds, scientists, reformers, "Urnings" (a term coined by Ulrichs), or "members of a third sex" (a phrase coined by Elsa Asenijeff popularized by Ernst von Wolzogen in his eponymous 1899 novel).

During the 1920s and early 1930s, Schöneberg's nightspots catered to LGBT clientele and curious Moderns seeking risqué and "unusual" entertainment. Bars, cabarets, and ballrooms offered same-sex dancing, cross-dressing, racy shows, exotic dancers, and prostitutes seemingly willing to satisfy their customers' desires. Visitors at the time, steeped in Victorian and Wilhelmine prudence, were reminded of the biblical "Babylon". The names, images, and ideas that gain prominence in this period go on to influence what is presently called "queer sensibility". People viewed as freaks and poor wretches deserving of sympathy at best before WWI began to radically define themselves and demand visibility.

The labor movement called the bourgeois family model into question from a leftist perspective, while liberal-minded bosses and industrialists began to see women's participation in the workforce from a business management point of view. It became a real possibility for women to sustain themselves without depending on a man's income or attempting to participate in the "shadow economy". Marriage, child-raising, systems of kinship, and notions of how societies "should" work, were all up for negotiation in many places after WWI, especially in Berlin.

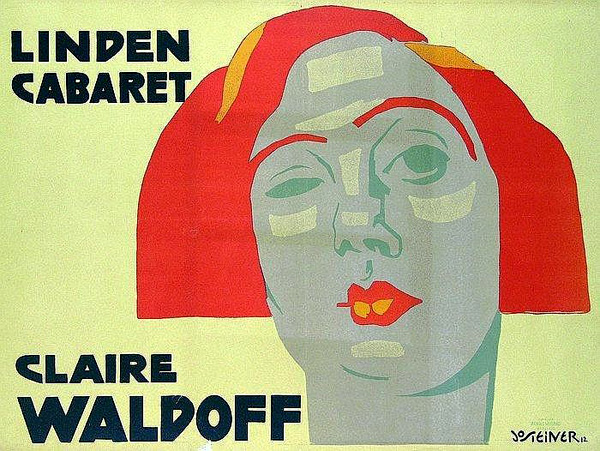
Bill for Claire Waldoff performance at Linden Cabaret, Berlin (Jo Steiner, 1912)

The careers of many artists, actors, writers and thinkers flourished in Weimar-era Berlin. Cabaret singer Claire Waldoff, actress Marlene Dietrich, and many more, were frequent guests and performers in many establishments throughout Berlin. The first gay demonstration also started in Berlin in 1922. The Reichstag nearly decriminalized homosexuality in 1929, but the time was not opportune for change of this kind.

=== Nazi Germany ===
In February 1933, a coalition of former nobility, industry moguls, and those who pined for the old order, essentially handed the chancellorship over to Hitler and his NSDAP. The SA, in collaboration with the police, immediately began bullying and intimidating Social Democrats, communists, and anyone else they saw fit to. Homosexual men, as well as women who did not look or act the part the Nazis had chosen for "the German woman", were ideal targets for this kind of "sanitizing" operation. The Reichstag fire gave the now NSDAP lead parliament the wherewithal to suspend civil liberties and parliamentarianism indefinitely, essentially making Adolf Hitler the Generalissimo of the Reich.

The Eldorado, having gained notoriety beyond the city limits of Berlin, had already been the target of raids ordered by the new police chief before the Nazis were officially in power in 1932. It was hurriedly turned into an SA base and torture house, but it was eventually re-opened under the watchful eye of the Gestapo and things almost went back to normal.

When wealthy tourists came for the 1936 Summer Olympics in Berlin, there was much praise from all sides about how Hitler had "cleaned Berlin up", and what a "safe" city Berlin had become, how he and his Brownshirts had "put Germans back to work, and how grand it all was."

What went unnoticed by many was what was no longer to be seen. Communists, social democrats and other dissidents, and those who had been labeled "undesirables" by Nazi standards had been either tortured to death by the SA in cooperation with the regular police force, incarcerated, or had fled the country. Any reference to their having existed was erased.

The sacking of Magnus Hirschfeld's villa and institute on In den Zelten on May 6, 1933 (incidentally not by the SA, but by organized members of the student body of the university, with the explicit backing of the faculty who marched the bust of Hirschfeld, stolen from his institute, down Unter-den-Linden to the May 10, 1933 book burning Opernplatz by themselves, wearing their full academic regalia), is only one example of the fascist purge that began with the Reichstag Fire as a justification only one month after the government had been handed over to Hitler's Nazis.

The Nazi purge against real and presumed adversaries of the new German government was so thorough that, after 1945, the remaining histories had to be pieced back together, including that of the first gay movement. The works, biographies, and existence of Magnus Hirschfeld had to be reconstructed in minute archival work beginning in the 1970s. This can largely be credited to the activists of the Verlag rosa Winkel publishing house, established in 1975 in West Berlin by activists of the Homosexuelle Aktion Westberlin (HAW).

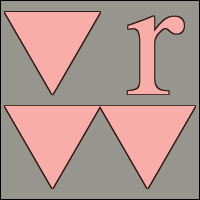
Verlag rosa Winkel logo

Of the millions of people killed in German SA dungeons and work camps, through slave labor, and in extermination camps between 1933 and 1945, several thousand were men who had been sentenced according to section 175 of the Reichs Criminal Code. About 6,000 were actually interned to camps. The death rate is presumed to be high, but reliable numbers are not available. Upon the liberation of the camps, their inmates greatly feared being re-incarcerated; such fears proved to be justified.

The number of queer women interned during the Nazi period is the subject of great debate in the present. As there were no explicit laws against women having sex with women, or against exhibiting non-gender-conforming behavior, law enforcers had to find other ways to criminalize queer women. Women could be incarcerated for so-called anti-social behavior. The definition of what this constituted was extremely vague. Many thousands of people were arrested on the basis of laws against anti-social behavior. Here again, reliable numbers are not available.

The Memorial to Homosexuals Persecuted Under Nazism is across in the Große Tiergarten across Ebertstraße from Peter Eisenman's Memorial to the Murdered Jews of Europe, and down the road from the Porajmos memorial (The Memorial to the Sinti and Roma Victims of National Socialism) in Tiergarten.

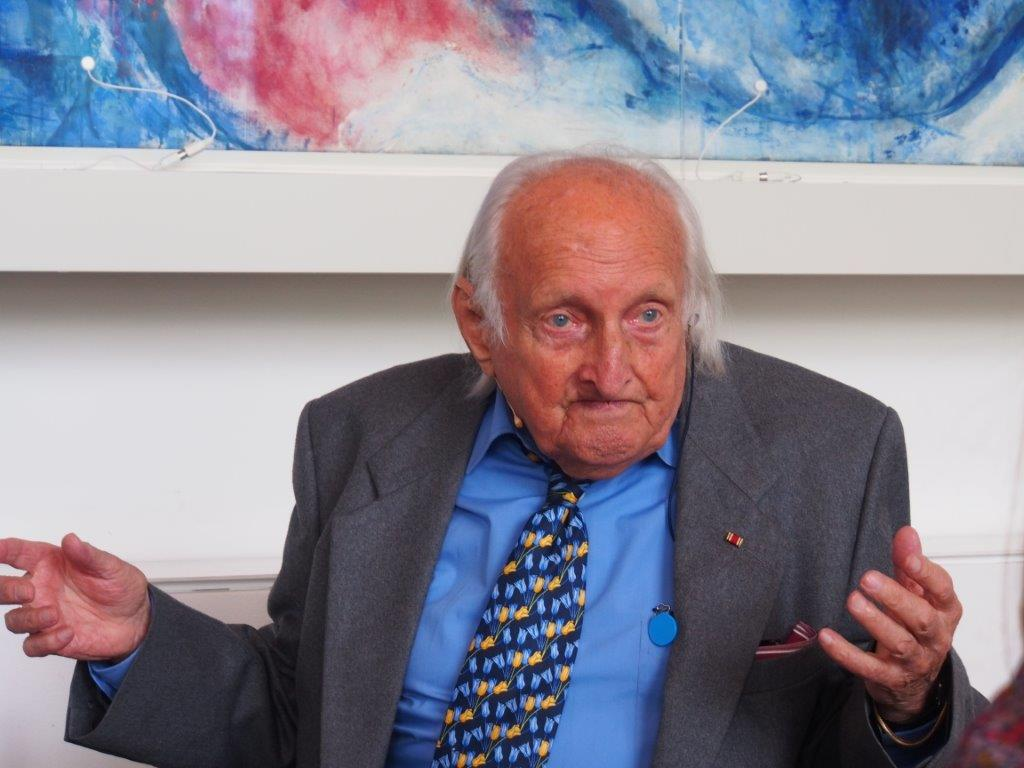
Wolfgang Lauinger, activist for compensation for persecution under §175 (book presentation: Lauingers. Eine Familiengeschichte aus Deutschland, Frankfurt, 2015)

=== Postwar era ===
In 1950, the German Democratic Republic (East Germany) returned to the pre-Nazi version of Section 175; Section 175a continued to be applied. From the late 1950s onwards, homosexual acts among adults were no longer punishable. In 1968, the GDR enacted a completely new penal code, which made same-sex sexual acts with minors a punishable offense for both women and men in § 151. With effect from July 1, 1989, this paragraph was deleted from the East German law books completely.

For two decades, the Federal Republic of Germany (West Germany) stuck to the versions of Sections 175 and 175a from the Nazi era. During the period from 1945 to 1969, 50,000 men were convicted according to Section 175 in West Germany. That is roughly the same amount of convictions as during the Nazi era. The first reform came in 1969 and the second in 1973. These changes effectively made only sexual acts with males under the age of 18 punishable by law. The age of consent for lesbian and heterosexual acts at the time was 14 years.

In 1994, four years after the unification of East and West Germany, Section 175 was completely repealed for the territory of the old Federal Republic. Those who had been punished under the broader version of Section 175 that was in effect until 1969, and many of whom had suffered imprisonment and an entry under their names in the national criminal record leading to life-long consequences for their employment and housing situations, were not rehabilitated until 2017. Compensation payments, provided those affected were eligible for them at all and still alive, were negligible. Compensation of 3,000 euros and an additional 1,500 euros "for each year of detention suffered" was only granted to those men who were actually convicted.

The Homosexuelle Aktion Westberlin (HAW) (Englisch: Gay Action West Berlin) was the first founded in 1971. In 1985, Berlin opened the world's first gay museum, otherwise known as the Schwules Museum, "an institution dedicated to preserving, exhibiting, and discovering gay and lesbian history, art, and culture". Contemporary Berlin actively promotes tourism in gay neighborhoods, including Schöneberg.

=== Gallery ===
History

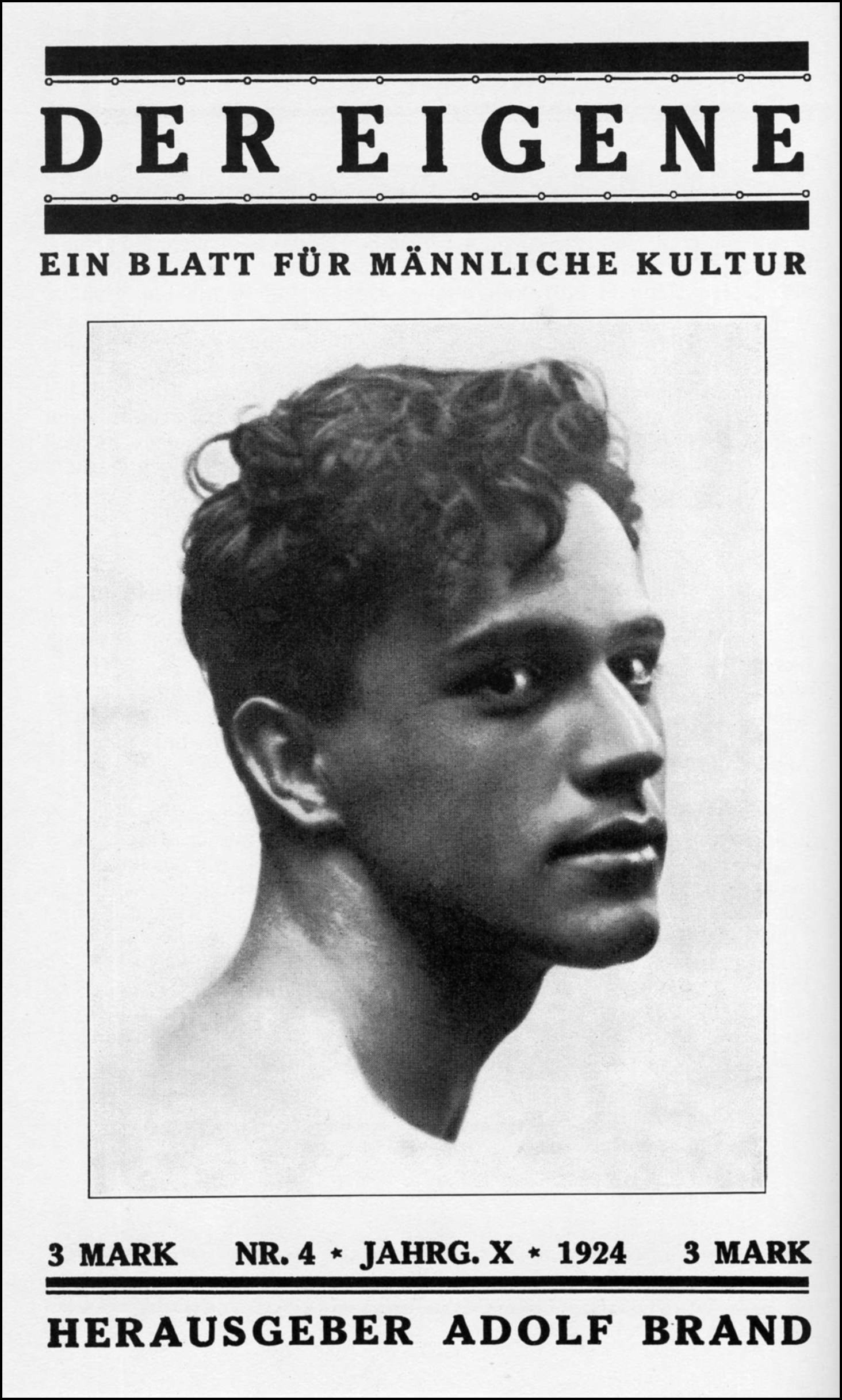
Der Eigene, the world's first gay magazine

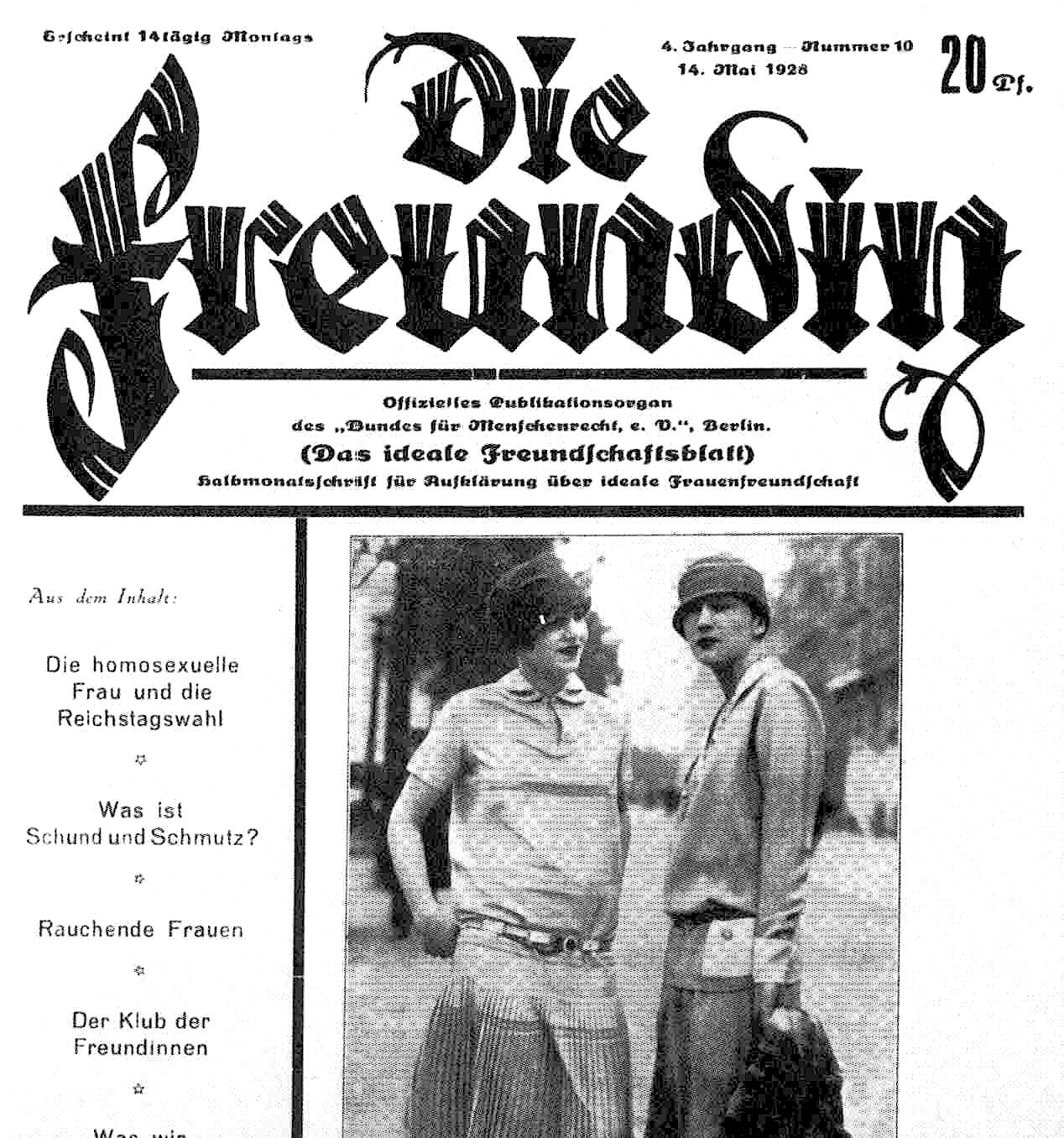
Die Freundin, a historic lesbian magazine, 1928

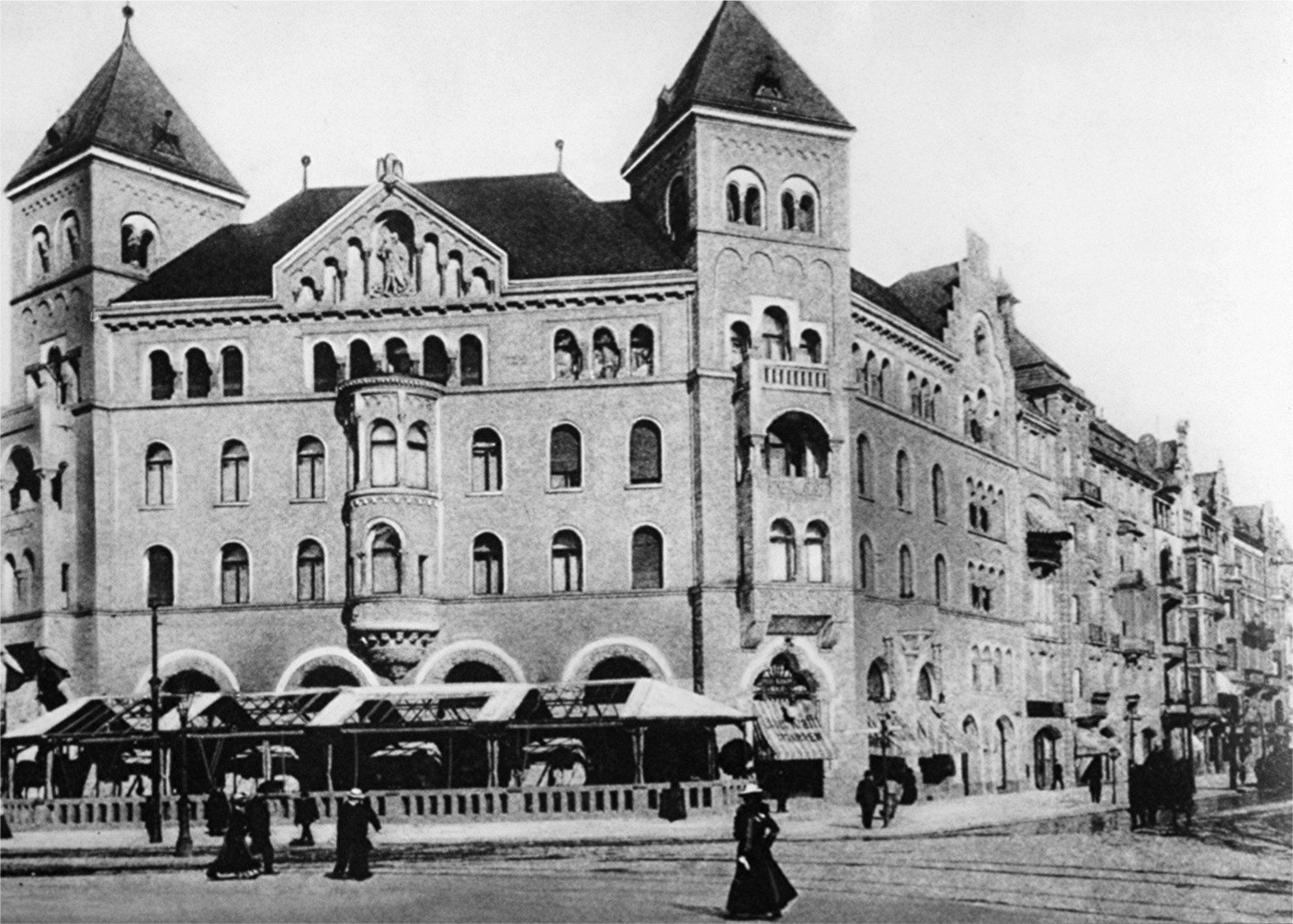
The Romanisches Café on Auguste-Viktoria-Platz (present-day Breitscheidplatz) circa 1901–1910, a prominent historical example of an "artists'" café in Berlin's "Neuer Westen"

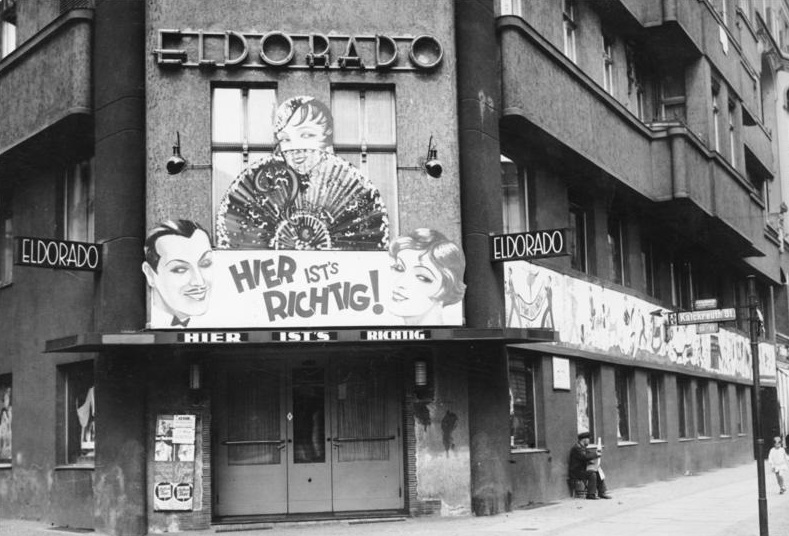
Eldorado Club of Christopher Isherwood fame, 1932

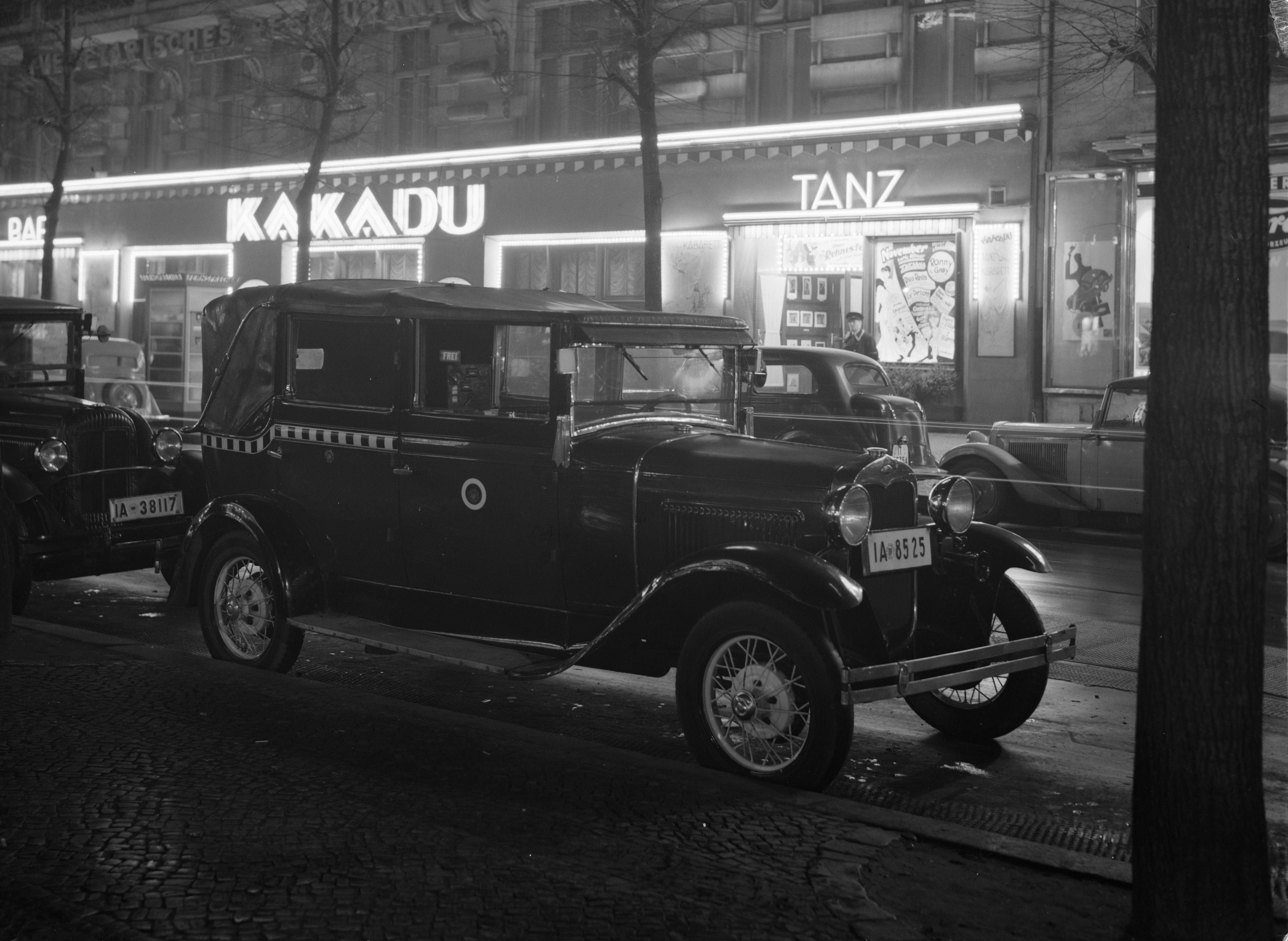
Kakadu bar, corner of Joachimsthalerstraße, Augsburger Straße, and Kurfürstendamm, operated from 1919 to 1937

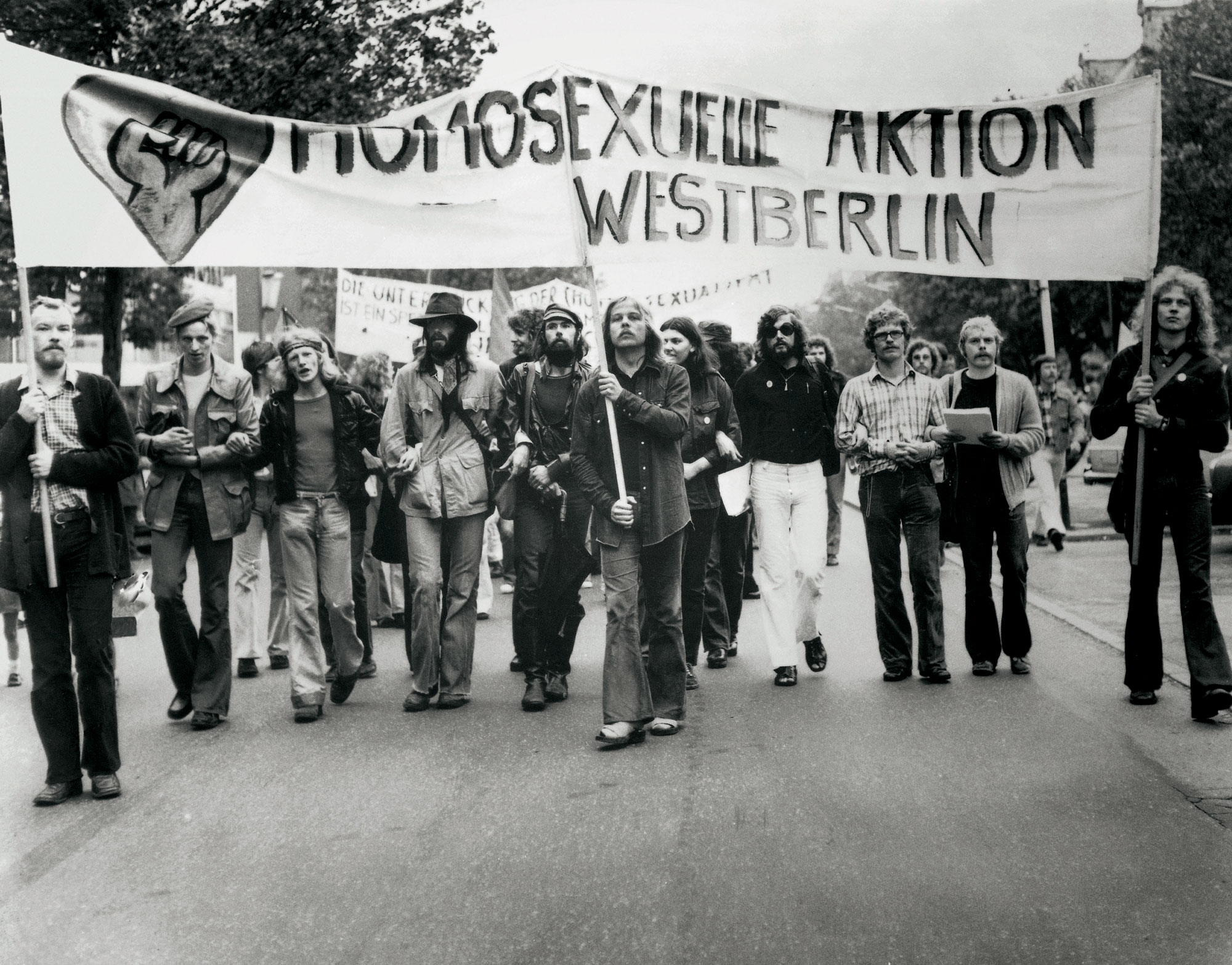
HAW "Pfingstdemo" (protest), likely in Schöneberg (likely June 11, 1973)

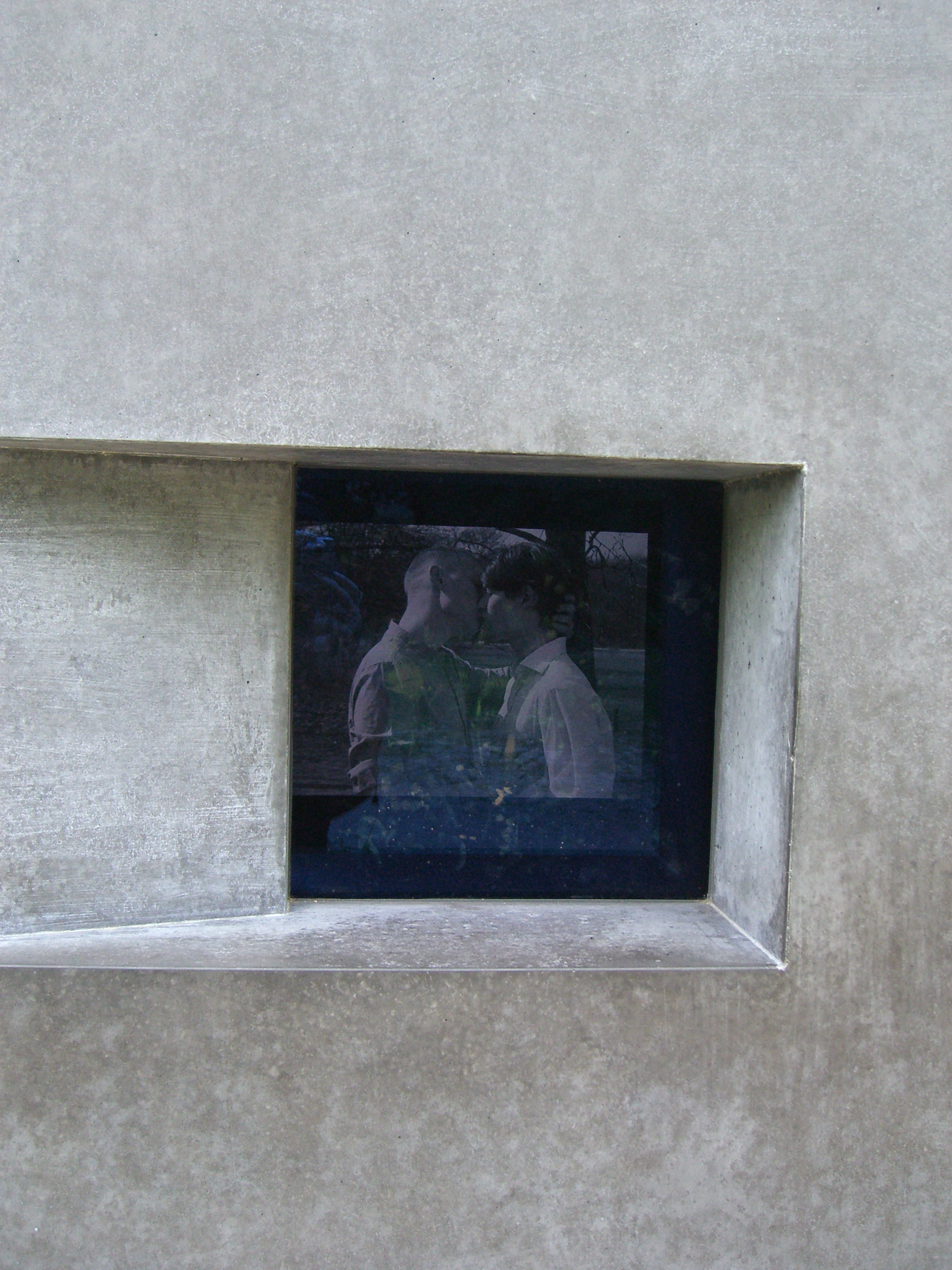
Memorial to Homosexuals Persecuted Under Nazism

== Contemporary Berlin (1945–present) ==
While a sometimes infamous openly queer scene existed during pre-war Berlin, it is historically inaccurate to attribute contemporary queer culture to these beginnings. Rather, many sexual and gender minorities left Germany in mass exodus during the Nazi regime, while those who did not were persecuted in concentration camps. When the Nazis came to power, they burned down Hirschfeld's Institute for Sexual Science and the decades of research that it held. This included documentation of the gay liberation movement prior to World War I and studies of the first gender-affirming surgeries and philosophical argumentation on same-sex attraction as inborn, along with many more ideas. As historian Klaus Mueller argues in Eldorado: Everything the Nazis Hate, "today's queer Berlin certainly isn't a continuation in any shape or form of the 1920s. That really was lost. No names. No memory. Nothing."

=== Divided Berlin (1945–1989) ===
In West Berlin, a liberal and open environment fostered a flourishing queer culture from the late 1960s onwards. The city became a haven for LGBTQ individuals, characterized by bars, clubs, and cultural events that accommodated them. Gay and lesbian activism emerged during this period, particularly in the 1970s. The influence of capitalist consumer society also shaped queer lifestyles as commercial spaces began to cater to LGBTQ clientele.

In contrast, East Berlin's queer culture was marked by repression and secrecy. The German Democratic Republic's policies criminalized homosexuality until 1968. Despite this, underground networks and informal gatherings emerged. From what historians have been able to discern, these spaces took the place of bars hidden behind the mask of a store front, abandoned public restrooms, and private spaces. Researchers argue that sexual practices were engaged in as a form of resistance and a means of community-building. Although limited, activism in East Germany began to take root in the 1970s, with groups advocating for gay and lesbian rights, albeit under the constant threat of state surveillance. After the fall of the Berlin Wall, East Berliners gained access to the more liberated queer culture of the West and allowed their own underground community to come to the surface, leading to a blending of communities and spaces.

==== AIDS epidemic (1981–1989) ====
The AIDS epidemic in Berlin primarily unfolded during the 1980s and 1990s, with significant developments occurring both before and after the reunification of Germany in 1990. The initial emergence of AIDS as a public health crisis began in the early 1980s, a period characterized by a lack of awareness and understanding of the disease, particularly within the gay community, which was disproportionately affected.

Before reunification, Berlin's nightlife and sexual liberation movements created an environment conducive to the spread of HIV. The city's reputation as a hub for sexual exploration and experimentation meant that many individuals engaged in unprotected sex, often without knowledge of the risks associated with HIV. The first cases of AIDS were reported in West Berlin in the early 1980s. Though, this is not to say it is the first place where HIV was contracted and led to AIDS. The less-tolerant culture toward queer people in the GDR acted as an obstacle for queer people to find help, thus documentation on the East may be limited. By the mid-1980s, the epidemic had begun to take a significant toll on the gay community, leading to widespread fear and stigma.

In the early years of the epidemic during the 1980s, Berlin's gay scene became a focal point for HIV/AIDS transmission. The city was known for its open and often hedonistic nightlife, which included numerous bars, clubs, and events that facilitated sexual encounters, especially among men who have sex with men (MSM) to whom many of these spaces catered. The lack of awareness about HIV/AIDS in the initial stages of the epidemic contributed to its rapid spread, as many individuals engaged in unprotected sex without understanding the risks involved. The perception of AIDS as a "gay disease" led to significant stigma, which marginalized those affected and complicated public health responses.

During the AIDS epidemic, West Germany held public health campaigns that were inclusive and broad, with slogans like AIDS geht alle an ("AIDS concerns us all"). This contrasted with East Germany's focus on specific groups, particularly homosexuals, as a "risk group," reflecting different ideological priorities. In the West, the affected people's voices were highlighted through grassroots activism from the gay community to initiate AIDS education campaigns, while East Berlin's efforts were more state-directed and medically-oriented. Being part of the Eastern Bloc, it was a more tightly-controlled environment. This contributed to minimized public hysteria but limited diverse perspectives on the epidemic. In contrast, West Berlin's free press facilitated both critical discussions and sensationalist narratives.

=== Reunified Berlin (1989–present) ===
The socio-economic conditions following reunification also facilitated the development of a vibrant clubbing culture. The availability of cheap urban space in the early 1990s allowed for the establishment of numerous underground venues, which became incubators for queer culture and nightlife. As these spaces evolved, they attracted a diverse crowd of locals and international visitors. The adaptability of these venues, often described as part of Berlin's "queer archipelago," enabled them to thrive despite the pressures of gentrification and changing urban dynamics.

The reunification of Germany catalyzed a cultural renaissance in Berlin where the influx of new ideas and the dismantling of previous restrictions on sexual expression led to the proliferation of sex-positive clubs. These venues became spaces where queer people could freely explore their sexuality without the fear of persecution that characterized the GDR era. This naturally provided safe havens for those living in East Berlin to bring their culture of sexual community spaces to the club. The already-established queer party culture in the West further boosted this growth.

The emergence of clubs like Berghain in 1992 and other sex-positive venues can be traced back to this historical context. They provided safe havens for queer individuals to express their identities and engage in sexual practices openly. This culture spoke especially to the hyper-sexual culture of MSM, which faced significant repression in the East. This culminated in the emergence of clubs like Berghain hosting a male-only fetish club night called Snax. Snax is still hosted, now biannually.

Furthermore, the reunification of Germany in 1990 brought about significant changes in the LGBTQ landscape. The influx of ideas and practices from West Berlin helped to invigorate queer activism in the East, leading to the establishment of new organizations and events that celebrated LGBTQ identities.

==== Continuation of the AIDS epidemic ====
After its reunification, Berlin faced the dual challenges of addressing the ongoing AIDS crisis while integrating the healthcare systems of East and West Germany. The influx of resources and attention to public health issues following reunification allowed for more comprehensive responses to the epidemic. Activism from community organizations gained momentum during this period, with activists advocating for better healthcare access, education, and treatment options.

The introduction of antiretroviral therapy in the mid-1990s transformed HIV from a fatal disease to a manageable chronic condition. This medical advancement occurred after reunification. The activism and community mobilization that characterized the AIDS response in Berlin during this time culminated in ongoing efforts to combat stigma and promote health equity within the queer community.

The rollout of PrEP as a preventative medication has influenced the MSM portion of the LGTBQ+ community. Its introduction led to the return to sexual behaviour prior to the virus at least for some of this demographic. While some historians argue that a return to the past is not possible, rather parallels to the past emerge, PrEP's distribution led to increased condomless anal sex among MSM. The culture has not returned however. Prior to HIV, while STIs and STDs were present, members of this group did not view sex as something that could lead to their death. This period left a ripple of precaution, hesitation and fear among MSM and led to an increase in stigma towards MSM by associating anal sex and MSM with disease.

== Contemporary features ==
The contemporary queer scene in Berlin is characterized by a strong emphasis on critical engagement with inclusivity and intersectionality, reflecting an understanding of LGBTQ identities that encompasses various gender expressions and sexual orientations. This is evident in the rise of queer spaces that cater to marginalized groups within the LGBTQ community, such as people of color and transgender individuals.

Places like Lab.Oratory and Boiler historically cater exclusively to male patrons. However, there have been cases where feminine men and gender queer individuals have been rejected from these spaces. Historically, the existence of male-only spaces was to provide a safe space for gay men to experiment and express their sexuality away from a heteronormative gaze which would otherwise stifle one's ability to do so. In effect, the aim is to create a space where the expression of male same-sex attraction would not be othered. The inclusion of gender queer individuals in these spaces does not propagate the problem of the heteronormative gaze, so the entry policy has been evolving since the 2000s to include more types of non-female gender expressions in these spaces. Instances of exclusion on this basis still occur from spaces like this, but the emergence of concepts like queer masculinities which includes gay, bi, trans and queer men operates to reshape how people seeking entry are selected.

Likewise, the creation of FLINTA spaces reflects the critical questioning of intentional exclusion to create safe community spaces. FLINTA is a German originating abbreviation that stands for "Frauen, Lesben, Intergeschlechtliche, Nichtbinäre, Trans und Agender Personen". In other words, it is a term that includes those who do not fit into a cis male gender identity. This is motivated by the fact that the queer community is inherently diverse and not all feel as comfortable around cis men, and that having these spaces helps foster bonds for these members of the community. In fact, many queer spaces are male-dominated, particularly by white middle class individuals, a phenomenon representative across queer spaces in the western world. This topic is discussed in books like Jeremy Atherton Lin's Gay Bar: Why We Went Out.

On the other hand, there are queer venues like we.are.village, which aim to foster a sense of community and growth for various queer people in spaces distinct from the nightlife scene. Spaces like this are known for holding contact-improv sessions for queer masculine people which aim to explore the question of what happens when queer masculine people's bodies touch without any expectations attached. This can be prominent given the culture for MSM where interactions are frequently sexualized. Desexualized contact allows for exploration of these norms and provides queer men agency in how they communicate desire, boundaries and experience touch with one another. It also creates a space where diverse expressions of masculinity can coexist. This contrasts with traditionally male exclusive spaces like Lab.Oratory, where a hyper-masculine performance is the norm. Another example at we.are.village is group vocal sessions for queer BIPOC migrants aimed to empower people to explore their voices and foster comfort in their own vocal expressions. For many migrants, language and cultural barriers contribute to a sense of silencing. This further intersects with race and ethnicity, where especially non-white migrants voices may be overlooked in day-to-day interactions.

=== Drug use ===
Many of the initiatives that aim to foster a strong queer community in Berlin have been in response to obstacles faced by the community. Although the culture is framed in a positive light by concepts like queer joy, queer liberation, and the urban studies view of Berlin as a queer archipelago, the community today emerged from an intense history of systemic oppression and systematized violence towards queer folk.

The city's nightlife has become a focal point for queer expression. Some studies indicate that gay, lesbian, and trans individuals especially may engage in drug use as a means of coping with societal marginalization and discrimination. Amongst queer people from more conservative backgrounds, where acceptance of one's queer existence is scrutinized, the prevalence of drug use is higher. This is typically exacerbated for individuals who experience multiple forms of minority stress due to one's race, ethnicity, and gender identity, among others.

==== Chemsex (primarily amongst MSM) ====
Furthermore, certain sexual subcultures evolve through the use of recreational drugs often associated with the clubbing experience, such as GHB, mephedrone and methamphetamine. Among MSM, this has been linked to intentional use for enhanced sexual encounters. This phenomenon, referred to as "chemsex," reflects a broader trend where sexualized drug use becomes intertwined with nightlife. While this contributes to (and has been shaped by) a nightlife culture that celebrates sexual freedom and experimentation, it is not without risks. The city has been at the forefront of implementing harm reduction policies, such as drug testing services at festivals and clubs, which aim to promote safer drug use practices. For instance, sexual health clinics like Checkpoint.BLN offer counselling and support for those navigating chem sex and education on harm reduction.

The risks of normalized chem-sex were further brought under scrutiny following a string of murders in Friedrichshain. While according to specialists interviewed in the documentary Crime Scene Berlin: The Night Life Killer, which sensationalizes the case, the murderer was a sexually repressed gay man whose experience of sexual repression and speculated sexual assault in childhood led to the worsening of his mental health. The drug used was GHB, commonly referred to as liquid ecstasy, which requires only a several mili-litre difference from one's safe dosage to have lethal effects. In response, policies banning this drug were implemented with patrons being banned from Berghain as a consequence of its use in the club.

Similarly, Boiler Sauna and gay bars alike put up signs telling their patrons to keep careful watch of the drinks with an image of GHB being dropped into a cup with a vial. During this period, members of the queer community, especially MSM, felt increased homophobia from people outside the community. Within the community, this led to a period in which the MSM demographic became cautious about having sex in darkrooms and accepting drugs from strangers. The owner of Grosse-Freiheit 114, the bar where the first death was recorded, said 12 years after the murder in 2024 that he was still bouncing back from it.

=== Migration ===
In recent years, Berlin has also become a destination for queer migrants, whose experiences often intersect with issues of identity, belonging, and solidarity as they navigate their queer identities within the context of their ethnic and cultural backgrounds. This dynamic has led to the establishment of support networks and organizations that address the specific needs of queer migrants.

While Berlin has a more welcoming attitude towards migrants than the rest of Germany, queer migrants (especially those from non-western nations and/or of non-white racial identities) experience xenophobia and discrimination propagated via these policies and in day-to-day interactions. This has been especially poignant in Germany with the rise of neo-nazism, which has led to violent attacks on migrants by mobilized neo-Nazis. A case of this is documented in Jacob Kushner's White Terror: A True Story of Murders, Bombings and a Far-Right Campaign to Rid Germany of Immigrants.

Since 2020, instances of migrants, particularly from more conservative backgrounds, where physical and verbal violence towards queer people can be more normalized, has sparked heated discourse in Berlin. At extremes, these cases are said to fuel xenophobia and racism particularly on the right, while also leading to people on the left turning a blind eye to the events. The cases of assaults (both physical and verbal) have been on the rise in Berlin since at least 2018 and are especially prominent in neighbourhoods like Neukölln, which have a large migrant Muslim population. This has contributed to an increase in anti-immigration politics among queer people in Berlin, which previously held a pro-immigration stance.

Research indicates that clubbers often view drug use as a form of cultural accommodation, where the act of consuming drugs is seen as a rite of passage or a means of enhancing social interactions. This perspective is particularly prevalent among younger adults who frequent clubs, as they often associate drug use with fun, freedom, and a sense of belonging. Doing so facilitates queer joy; the celebration of happiness, resilience, and authenticity for queer people.

=== Gentrification ===
Early on, the availability of affordable spaces has allowed for the establishment of pop-up events and underground parties. The culture surrounding these events was liberation, which was particularly evident in the case of gender and sexual minorities who benefited from the culture of questioning gender roles and sexual liberation emphasized in the night life spaces. However, in the face of gentrification, many traditionally queer spaces in Berlin's nightlife are at risk of closing due to increased rent prices. Furthermore, to survive, many clubs are raising entrance fees, which makes the nightlife less accessible for more economically-marginalized queer people.

Fostering spaces that cater to specific identities, especially when the demographic in Berlin is small, can be a challenge. Space is becoming increasingly difficult to find in the city due to factors like gentrification. The "queer archipelago", which describes the chain of interconnected queer spaces scattered across Berlin's urban sphere, contributes to the persistent growth and stability of queer spaces. While many spaces are independently-run and are of a grassroots nature, some also receive funding from the city government.

== Berlin's gayborhoods ==
=== Schöneberg ===
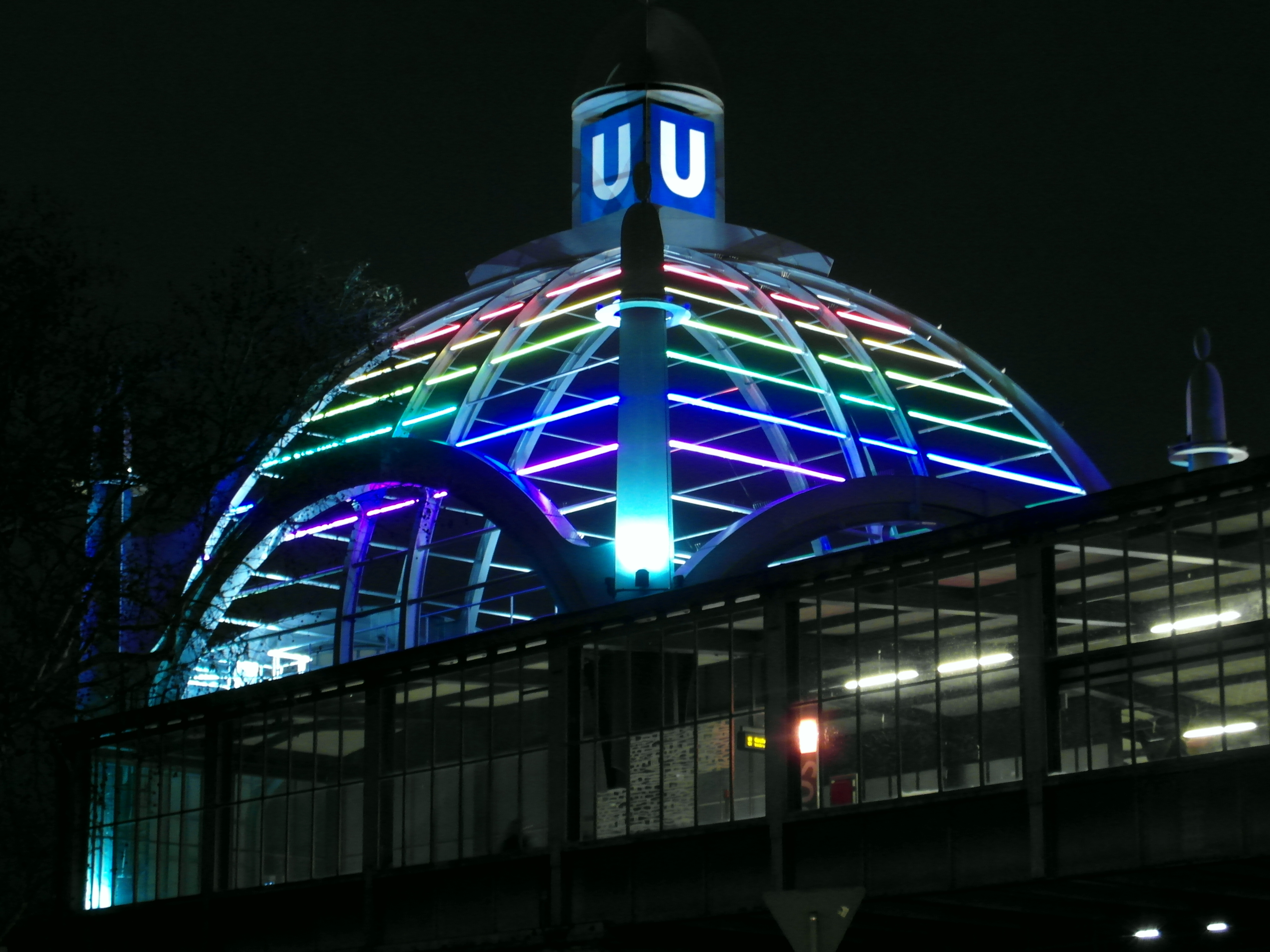
Rainbow illuminated Nollendorfplatz U-Bahn (subway) station by night, December 2013

The area near Nollendorfplatz, locally known as "Motzkiez", "Fuggerkiez", or "Nollendorfkiez" ("der Kiez" is a word for neighborhood in the local idiom, Berlinerisch), may be the best known of Berlin's roughly 4 neighborhoods with some explicitly LGBTIQ+ history, a reputation for being LGBT-friendly, and for having a large concentration of LGBTIQ+ locations. A hand drawn map from 1938 (5 years after the begin of Nazi rule) shows no fewer than 57 active or former gay and/or lesbian friendly spots hugging Nollendorfplatz and extending eastward down Bülowstraße.

In the first third of the 20th century, the working-class neighborhoods lying roughly between Wittenbergplatz and Bülowbogen (the sharp curve in Bülowstraße where it turns southward toward Klumerstraße and Goebenstraße) were popular for their red-light character, racy cabarets, and dance bars, though they had likely already existed for half a century at the time.

The area from the southern end of Friedrichstraße, well into the district of Neukölln, was known at the time for its inexpensive bars and café where people loitered in the hope of being picked for odd jobs, bartered and traded on the unofficial market, and engaged in prostitution. Isherwood's initially found lodging not far away from Hallesches Tor in Kreuzberg before moving to a boarding house at Nollendorfstraße 17 near Nollendorfplatz in December 1930, where he remained until May 1933. Isherwood's The Berlin Stories did not come out until well into the Nazi era.

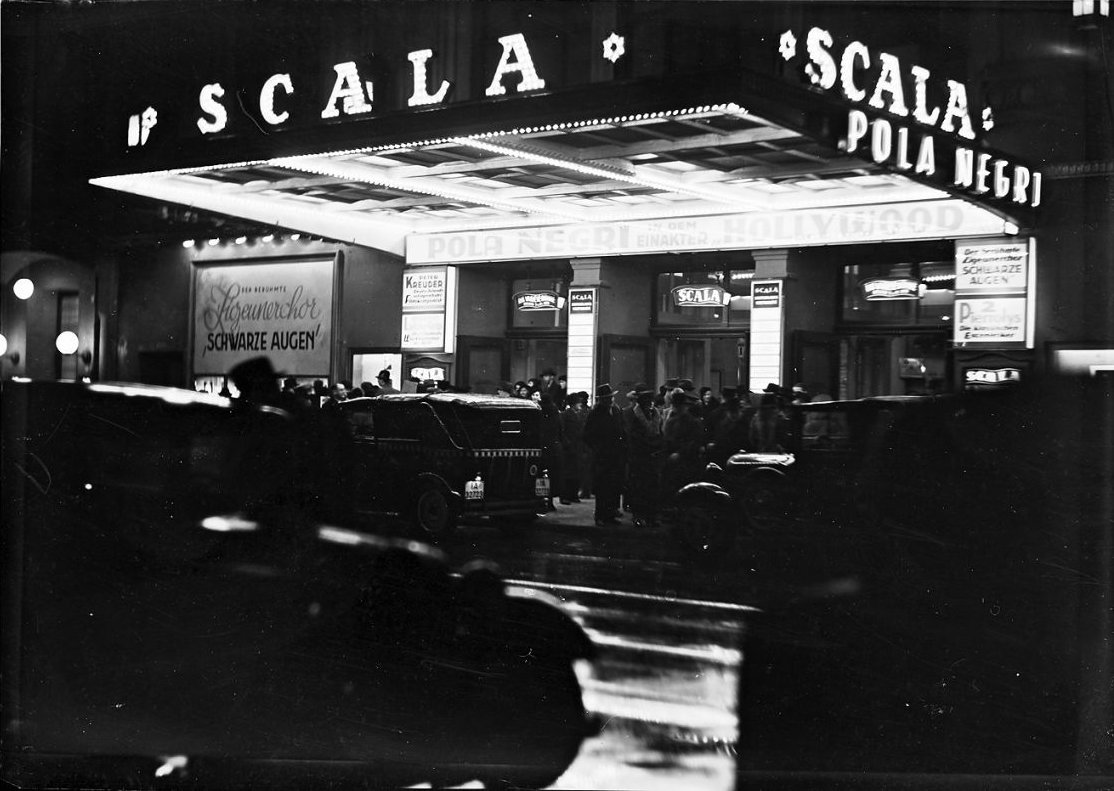
The Scala variety theater, Lutherstraße 22–24 (Martin-Luther-Straße 14–18), Berlin-Schöneberg (Willy Pragher, 1936)

During the 1920s and 30s, the area lying roughly to the south of KaDeWe gained notoriety through the German author of vice novels, Konrad Haemmerling's booklet, Führer durch das "lasterhafte" Berlin (roughly Guide to licentious Berlin), published under the pseudonym Curt Moreck, Leipzig, 1931 (republished 2018). Führer durch das lasterhafte Berlin was aimed at higher-income people "slumming", and promised to show interested visitors the "pleasures" of the "shadows". Haemmerling initially made the cabaret Eldorado infamous, which provided the inspiration for the cabaret in Isherwood's Berlin novels. When the slap-sticky show at the Scala on Lutherstraße ended, "spicier" fare could be found around the corner.

The area near Nollendorplatz was largely spared from the events of the Battle of Berlin. The bulldozing of the neighborhood in the 70s and 80s (as in the case of nearby Lietzenburger Straße in the 1960s) was prevented by the West Berlin squatters' movement. After the establishments around Kurfürstendamm and Auguste-Viktoria-Platz (after 1947 called Breitscheidplatz) were heavily damaged by the air-raids of WWII, much of what little remained disappeared during the automotive city remodeling of Breitscheidplatz in the early 1950s and the plans to build Bundesautobahn 106, the so-called Südtangente ("Southern Tangent") by rerouting Lietzenburger Straße.

In July 1932, Berlin's new Police President Kurt Melcher announced an "all-encompassing campaign against Berlin's licentious nightlife" (umfassende Kampagne gegen Berlins lasterhaftes Nachtleben), and in December of that year, it was decreed that all "dancing events of a homosexual nature were prohibited" (Tanzlustbarkeiten homosexueller Art zu unterbleiben [hätten]), see, e.g., the closing of Eldorado.

During the ensuing NSDAP rule of the German Reich, the neighborhood's nightlife was halted, except for a few night spots left open to ensnare and turn over to the police and Gestapo those who, according to the Nazi version of Section 175 of the German Criminal Code, "objectively offended the general sense of shame, and subjectively, the debauched intention was present to excite sexual desire in one of the two men, or a third" (objektiv das allgemeine Schamgefühl verletzt und subjektiv die wollüstige Absicht vorhanden war, die Sinneslust eines der beiden Männer oder eines Dritten [zu] erregen).

Soon after World War II, during which the neighborhoods of northern Schöneberg (along with most of the other German cities) were hit with incendiary bombs from 1943 to 1945, a thriving red-light district reemerged in the area, along with several venues popular with LGBTQ clientele. Waltherchens Ballhaus, Bülowstraße 37, or Kleist-Kasino, Kleiststraße 35 are frequently-named examples from this period.

Site of old Kino Arsenal, where in 1971 the Homosexuelle Aktion Westberlin (HAW) was founded

Well into the 1980s, several bars and parties were located closer to Kurfürstendamm, and the somewhat queerer places there were to an extent near the eastern end of the grand boulevard roughly between Kurfürstendamm and Kantstraße. To an extent, the fear of reprisal among LGBTIQ+ people themselves discouraged visible queerness (outside of some very specific settings) for a very long time. With northern Schöneberg being no exception, what has come to be called "queer visibility" did not become a liberation strategy until the student revolts in Europe widely associated with the year 1968.

As in many parts of the world, what was then called the gay liberation movement gained momentum in the early 1970s. In North America, the events in 1969 surrounding the Stonewall Inn are seen as the "beginning" of the gay liberation movement. For the West German LGBTQ movement, it began with a movie screening in Kino Arsenal at Welserstraße 25 of Rosa von Praunheim's film It Is Not the Homosexual Who Is Perverse, But the Society in Which He Lives (Nicht der Homosexuelle ist pervers, sondern die Situation, in der er lebt) at which forty viewers were present, all of which were men by all accounts. Most were more or less loosely associated with the protest movements of the period, described in West Germany as Spontis.

In the discussion ensuing the screening, the group decided to form a gay rights organization which was to become the Homosexuelle Aktion Westberlin (HAW). The founding, meeting, and naming of the Homosexual Action West Berlin (HAW) took place on November 21, 1971 in the hand drugstore, Motzstraße 24, a cooperatively-run space for young adults. The lesbian group Lesbisches Aktionszentrum Westberlin (LAZ) was founded out of this organization in the months that followed.

Unlike in the United States, where the Stonewall Inn has been made a national historical site, Welserstraße 25 is a childcare center today. The former Kino Arsenal's marquee used to be located above the center's door. The original marquee is in the basement of the Deutsche Kinemathek at Potsdamer Platz marking the entryway to the new Kino Arsenal in the Arsenal Institute for Film and Video Art. The original marquee is discretely located in the underground portion of the foyer below the Deutsche Kinemathek marking the entryway to the new Kino Arsenal.

There is very little left of the original atmosphere of anarchism around Nollendorfplatz, nor of the punk, alternative, rock and new wave clubs that existed there up until the new underground club scene in the eastern boroughs of Prenzlauer Berg, Friedrichshain, and Mitte began to flourish. The area is nicknamed Berlin's "Regenbogenkiez" (Rainbow Neighborhood), and festivities such as the Lesbian and Gay City Festival (Lesbischwules Stadtfest), Christopher Street Day, The Easter Berlin - Leather and Fetish Week, and Folsom Europe take place in the area.

Other especially LGBT-friendly neighborhoods of Berlin are Kreuzberg, Prenzlauer Berg, and Neukölln. Historically, parts of Charlottenburg were known as "artist's quarters" (among other things a euphemism for LGBT). Many places were, and still are, in the area between and around Kurfürstendamm and Kantstraße's ends nearer Bahnhof Zoologischer Garten (The Zoo Station). The Vagabund, Knesebeckstraße 77 (est.: 1969) are also still present.

Northern Schöneberg / Tiergarten

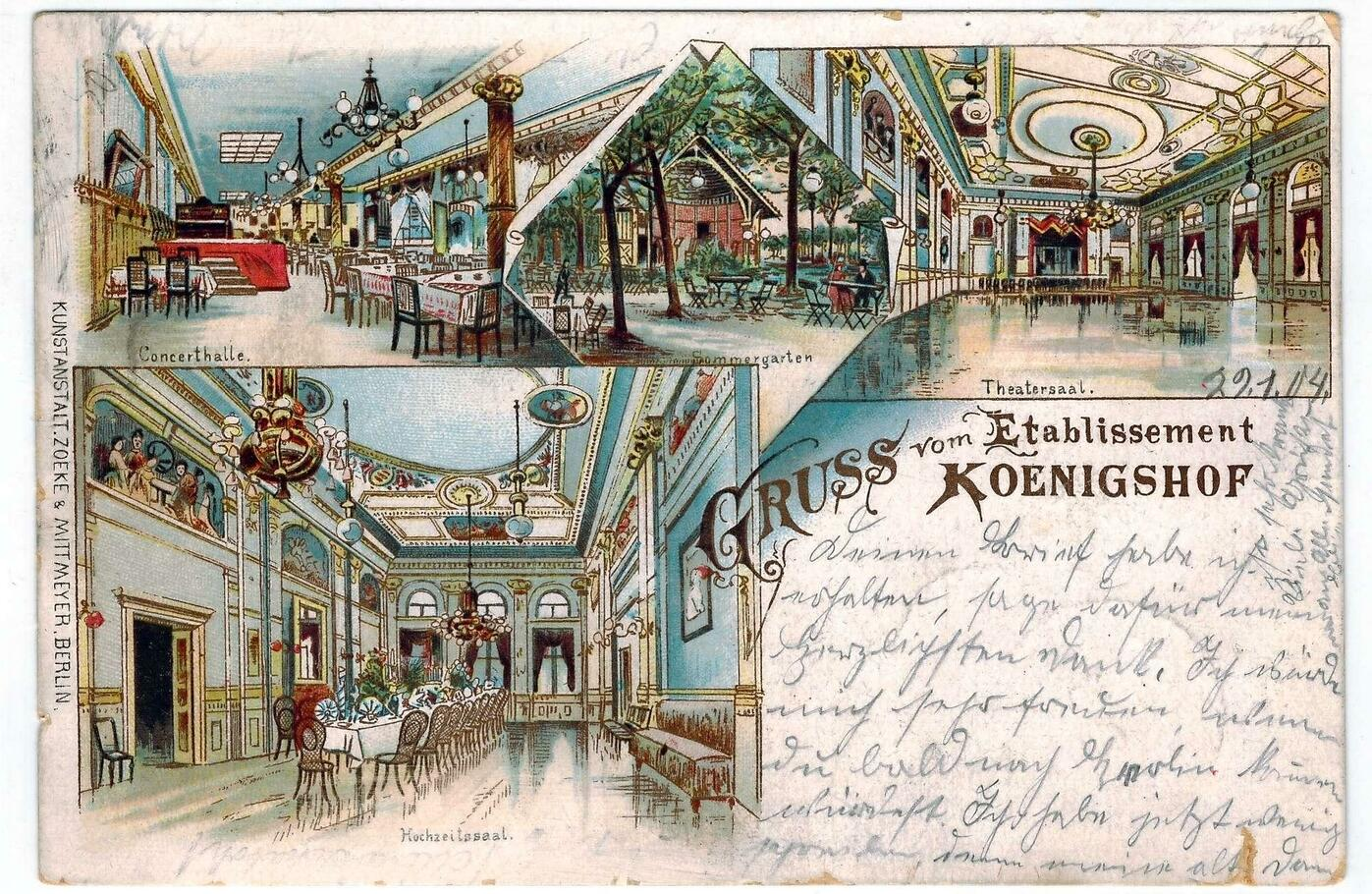
"Königshof" (ca. 1898), later renamed "Nationalhof", site of lesbian and transvestite balls (mid- to late 1920s)

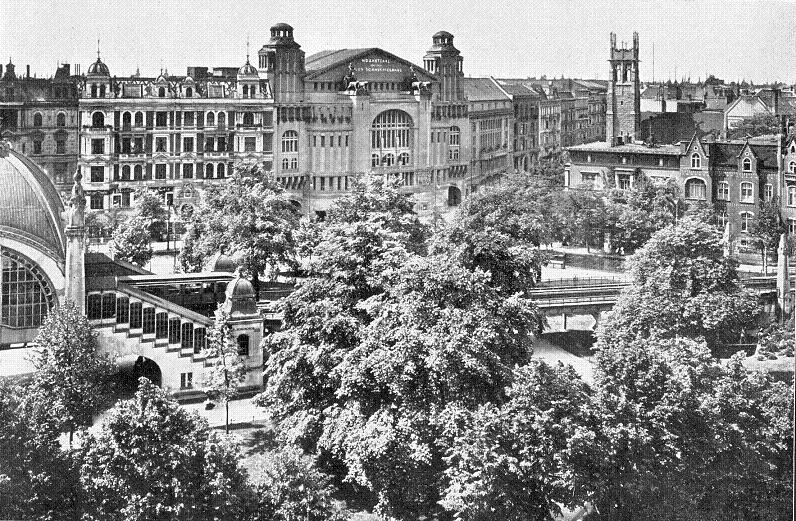
Motzstraße seen from Nollendorfplatz (1903)

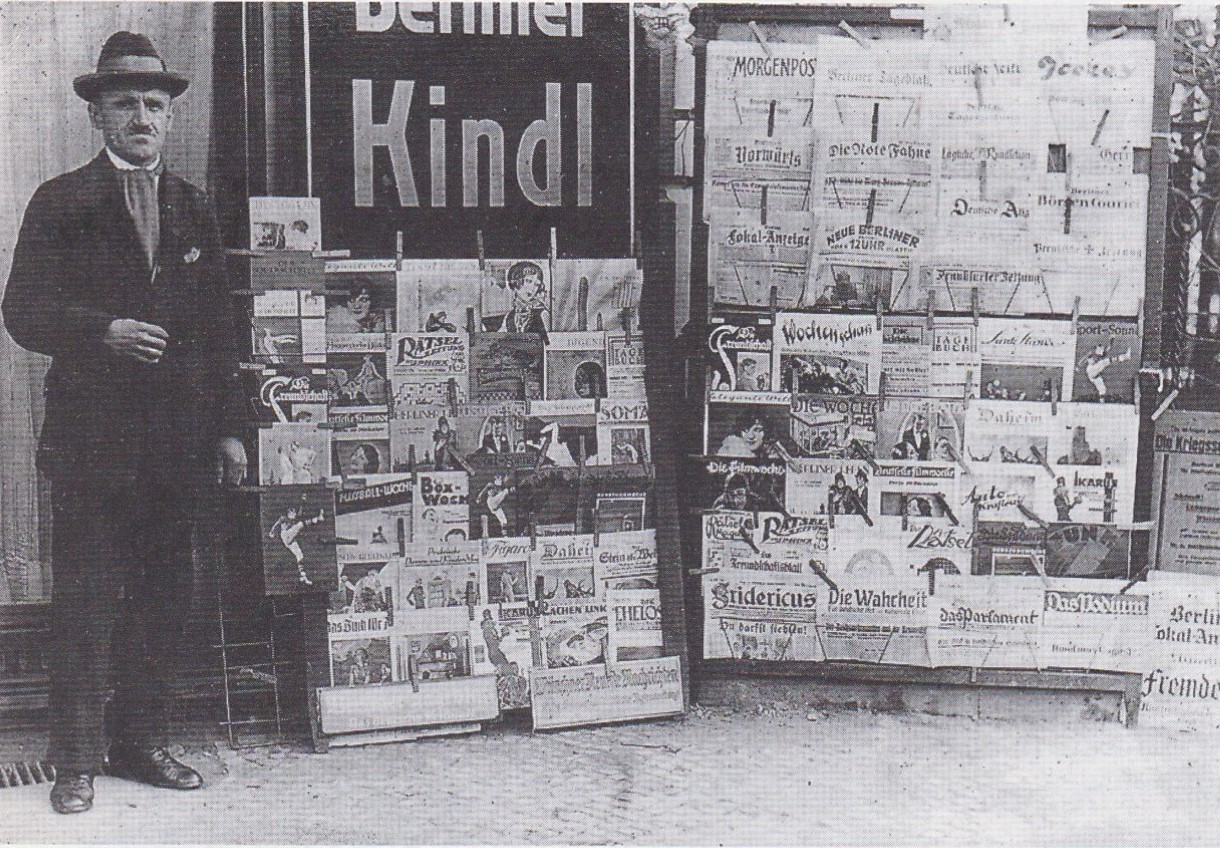
Die Freundschaft (3rd from top, left) Magazine, Berlin Newsstand (1922)

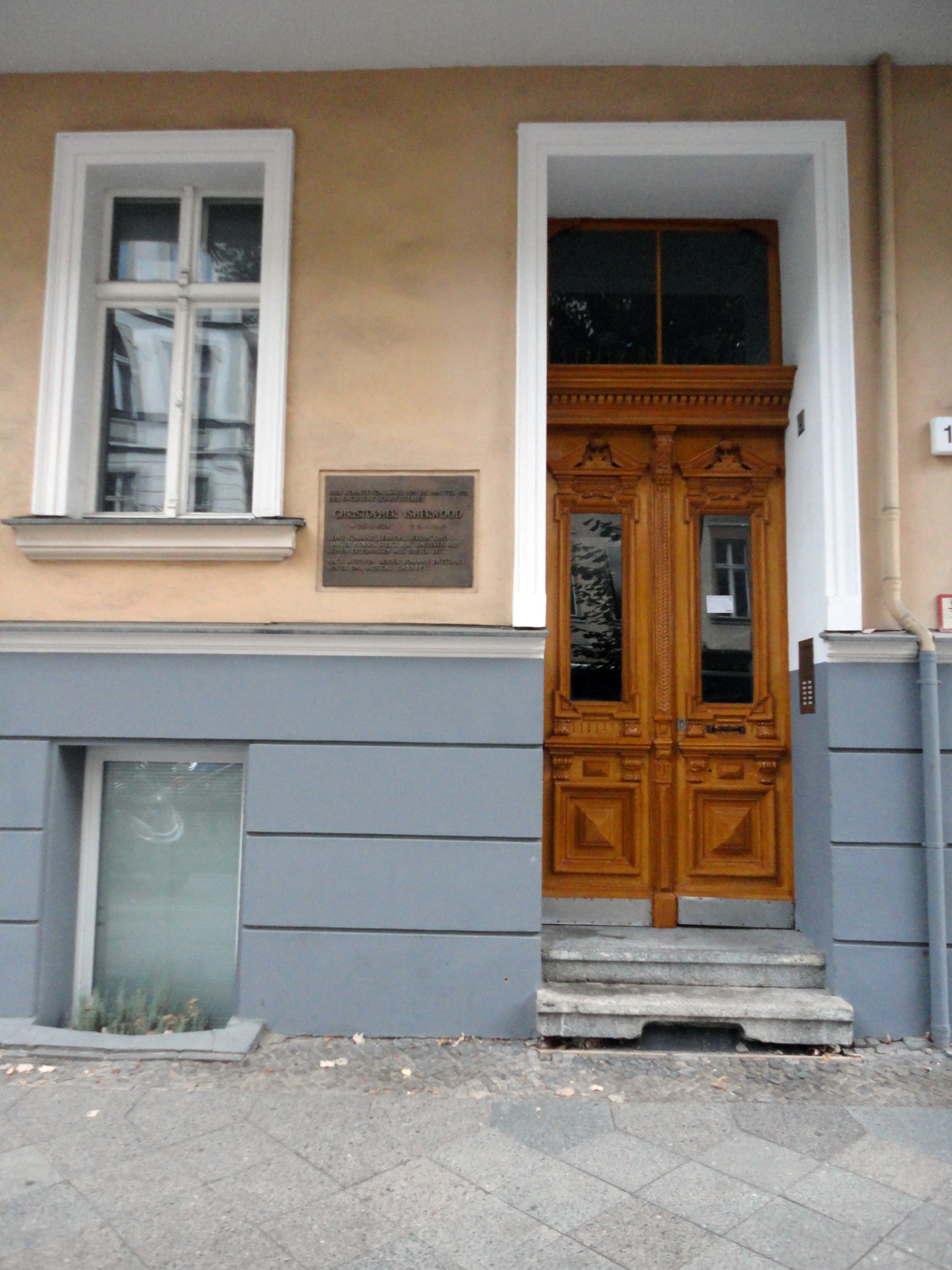
Christopher Isherwood's lodgings Nollendorfstraße 17 (1929-1933)

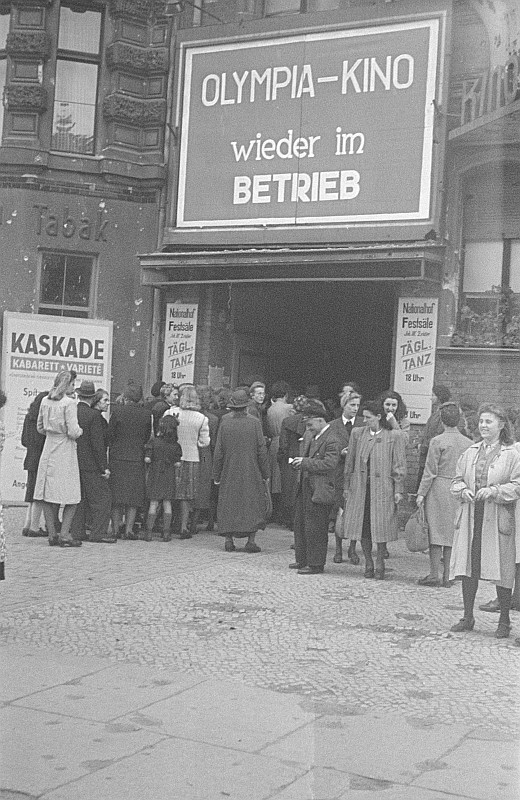
Bülowstraße 37. Re-opening after WWII

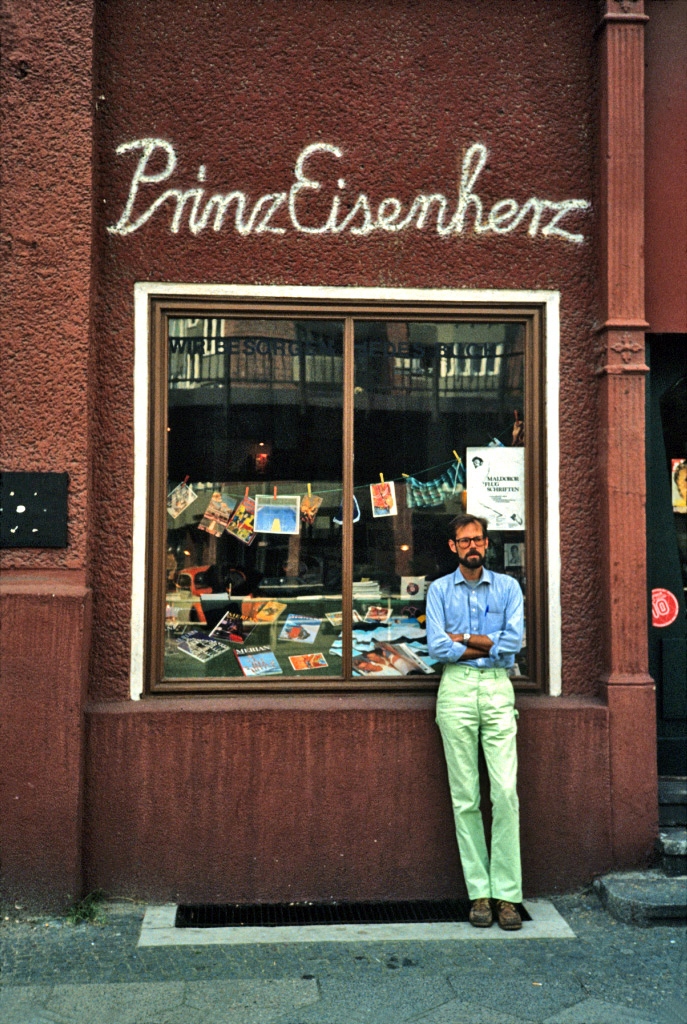
Lesbian and gay bookstore Prinz Eisenherz, Bülowstraße 17 (1980)
Standing: Prof. James Steakley (author / translator)

Begine women's café and cultural center est. by women in the West Berlin squatters' movement 1986

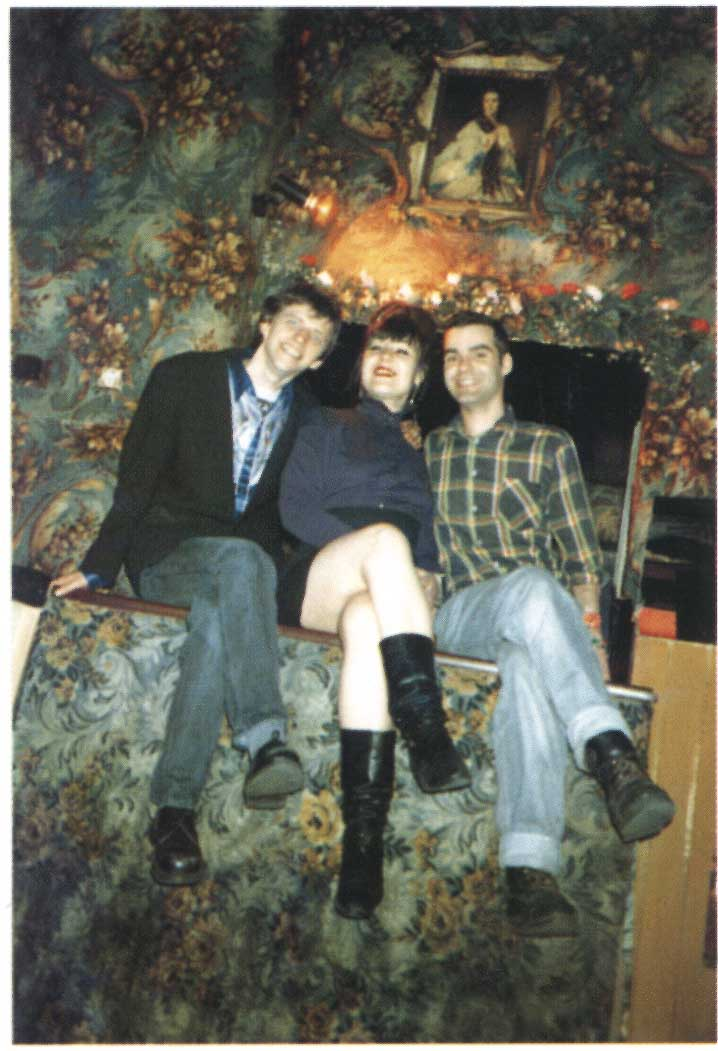
Music group Die Tödliche Doris (from left to right: Wolfgang Müller, Dagmar Dimitroff, Nikolaus Utermöhlen) in the bar Kumpelnest 3000, Lützowstraße 23 (1987)

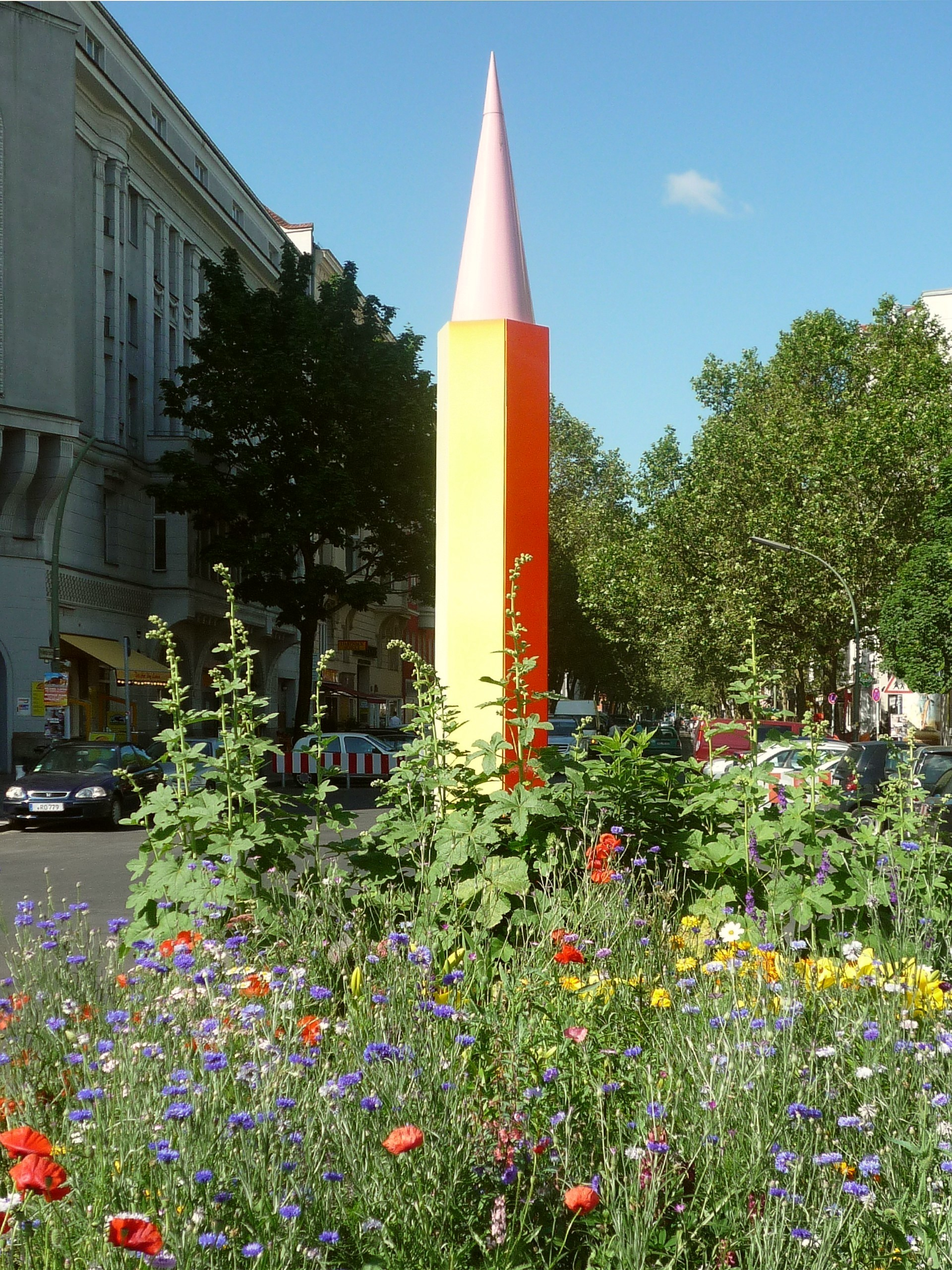
Rainbow Column at Nollendorfplatz by Salomé, erected by the AHA (2000)

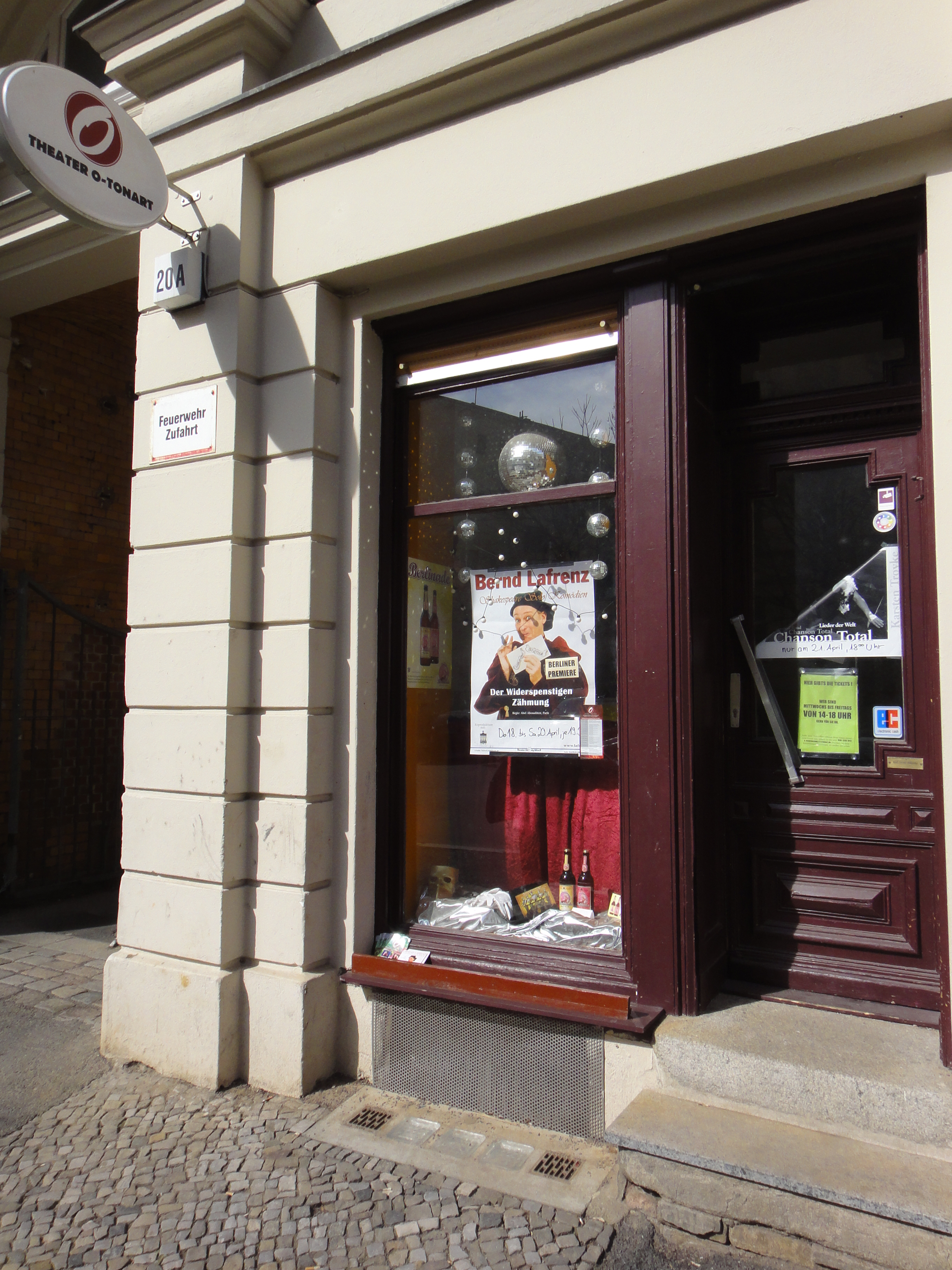
Theater O-TonArt, Klumerstraße 20a founded 2009 (address the 1st SchwuZ opened 1977)

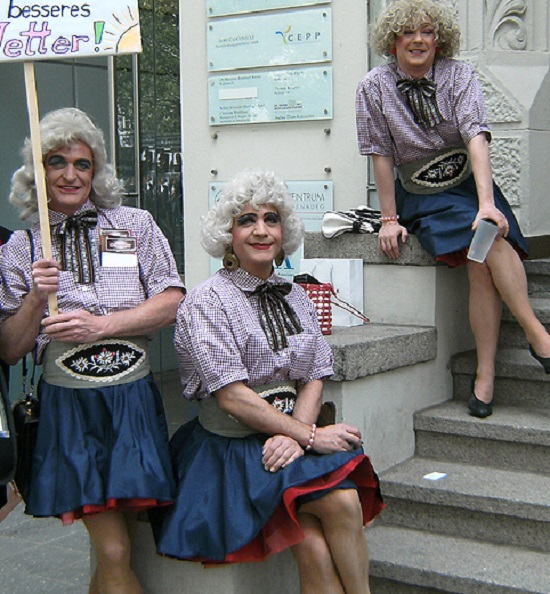
Ichgola Androgyn and the O-Tonpiraten before CSD 2010 in front of Kurfürstendamm 219 (2010)

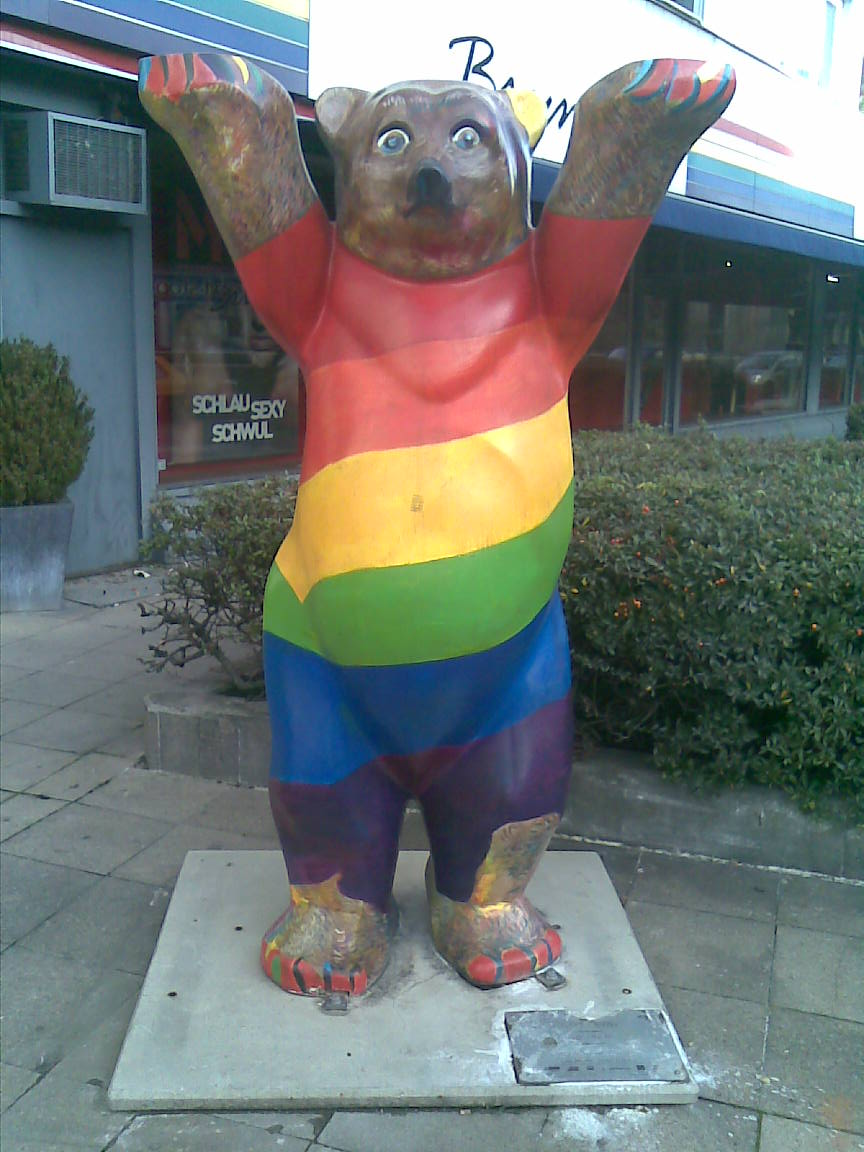
Rainbow painted Buddy Bear, Bruno's gay shop, Bülowstraße 106

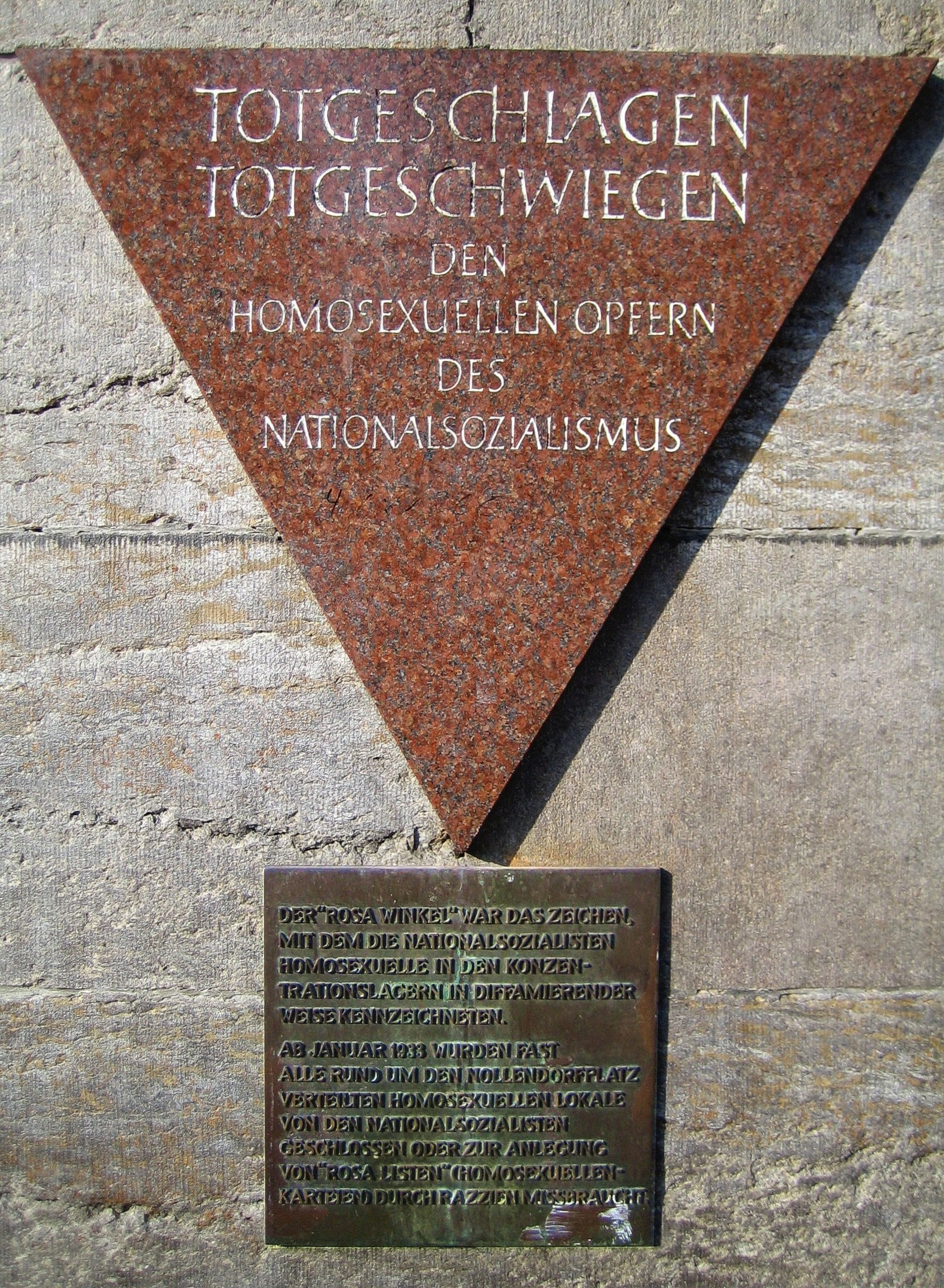
Memorial "Pink Triangle", metro station Nollendorfplatz

The lights of Motzstraße, Tom's, Motzstraße 19 (2020)

Die Scheune (bar) / Frontplay (sportswear) No. 25, Eisenherz bookstore No. 23, Zaxx (Cruising) / Tom's Hotel / offices Dr. Jessen / Hafen (bar) / Tom's (bar) No. 19. Motzstraße (2022)

=== Kreuzberg ===
Kreuzberg still has some of the atmosphere of anarchistic rebellion that characterized the beginnings of the Lesbian & Gay Liberation Movement the 1970s and 1980s. Always a working-class neighborhood, and bordered by the Berlin Wall to the north and to the east from 1962 to 1989, Kreuzberg was, and still is to an extent a sociopolitical micro-climate. The history of Kreuzberg is well-documented by the Friedrichshain-Kreuzberg Museum, Adalbertstraße 95a in Berlin-Kreuzberg, near many of Kreuzberg's queer / queer-friendly landmarks, like Möbel Olfe, SüdBlock / Aquarium, Café Kotti, Roses, AYO queer women's collective café, SO36 and others. The culture space and club SO36 are implicitly and explicitly queer, with the club's queer flagship event being the regular Gayhane parties organized by activist and artist Fatma Souad, and SO36 resident DJane DJ Ipek (İpek İpekçioğlu).

When Monika Herrmann (Alliance 90/The Greens) became district mayor in 2013, the fact that District Mayor Herrmann is a lesbian was no longer a topic of public debate, even in the tabloid press. This is primarily due to the precedent set by Governing Mayor Klaus Wowereit's (Social Democratic Party of Germany) in 2001, when upon his nomination, then-candidate Wowereit proclaimed "I am gay, and that is as it should be!" (German: Ich bin schwul, und das ist auch gut so!) at a public party caucus.

Kreuzberg has also gained notoriety beyond the Berlin's city limits among LGBTQ+ people and others for having "its own CSD". The event has gone by, among other names, "TransGenialer CSD", "Kreuzberg CSD", and "X*CSD". It has taken place most years since 1997 on or around the date of the larger CSD parade. One online tourist information resource mentions the event in one sentence with ancillary Pride events like "Gay Night at the Zoo". The event's origin is connected with common rats as an analogy for undesirables. Before the Abgeordnetenhaus of Berlin, on February 27, 1997, the chair of the Christian Democratic Union Party of Berlin, Landowsky expressed his impatience with what in his opinion was the city's hesitance to eradicate what he and his party associates viewed as the ills that afflict Berlin:

"Es ist nun einmal so, dass dort wo Müll ist Ratten sind, und dass dort, wo Verwahrlosung herrscht, Gesindel ist. Das muss in dieser Stadt beseitigt werden." Eklat bei Landowskys Rede

(Eng.: It just so happens that, where there is rubbish, there are rats, and where there is neglect, there is rabble. That needs to be eliminated in this city.)

This did not sit well with many committed citizens. The word "Gesindel" (Eng.: rabble) somewhat evoked the era of the Third Reich, and many of those who took offence to the statement were not entirely sure that Landowsky was not thinking of them. Against the backdrop of an ongoing factional dispute within the LGBTQ movement that dates back to the mid-1970s (see Tuntenstreit), and with tempers flaring over Landowsky's most recent remarks, the organizers of the larger CSD event decided that, beginning that year, there would be an entry fee for vehicles and floats taking part in the Berlin pride parade.

At a meeting in Club SO36 a group of queer activists decided to construct their own float, dress as rats, equip themselves with mud for throwing, and pay an unannounced visit to the 1997 Pride Parade. The reaction was as was to be expected, and Berlin's "alternative" queer protest event Kreuzberg Pride was born.

Kreuzberg

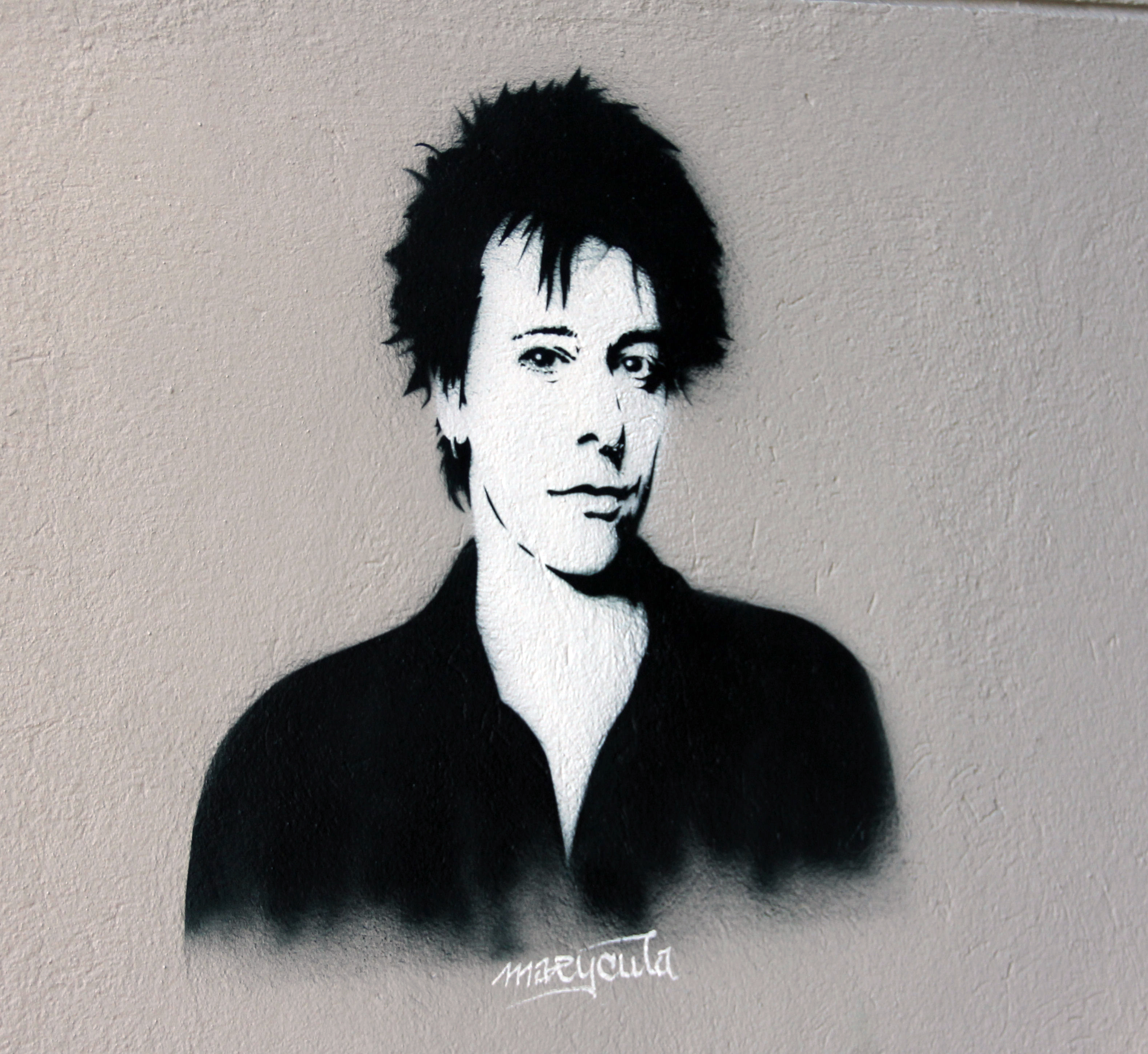
Mural depicting Rio Reiser, lead singer of Ton Steine Scherben, bard of the Spontis (and gay)

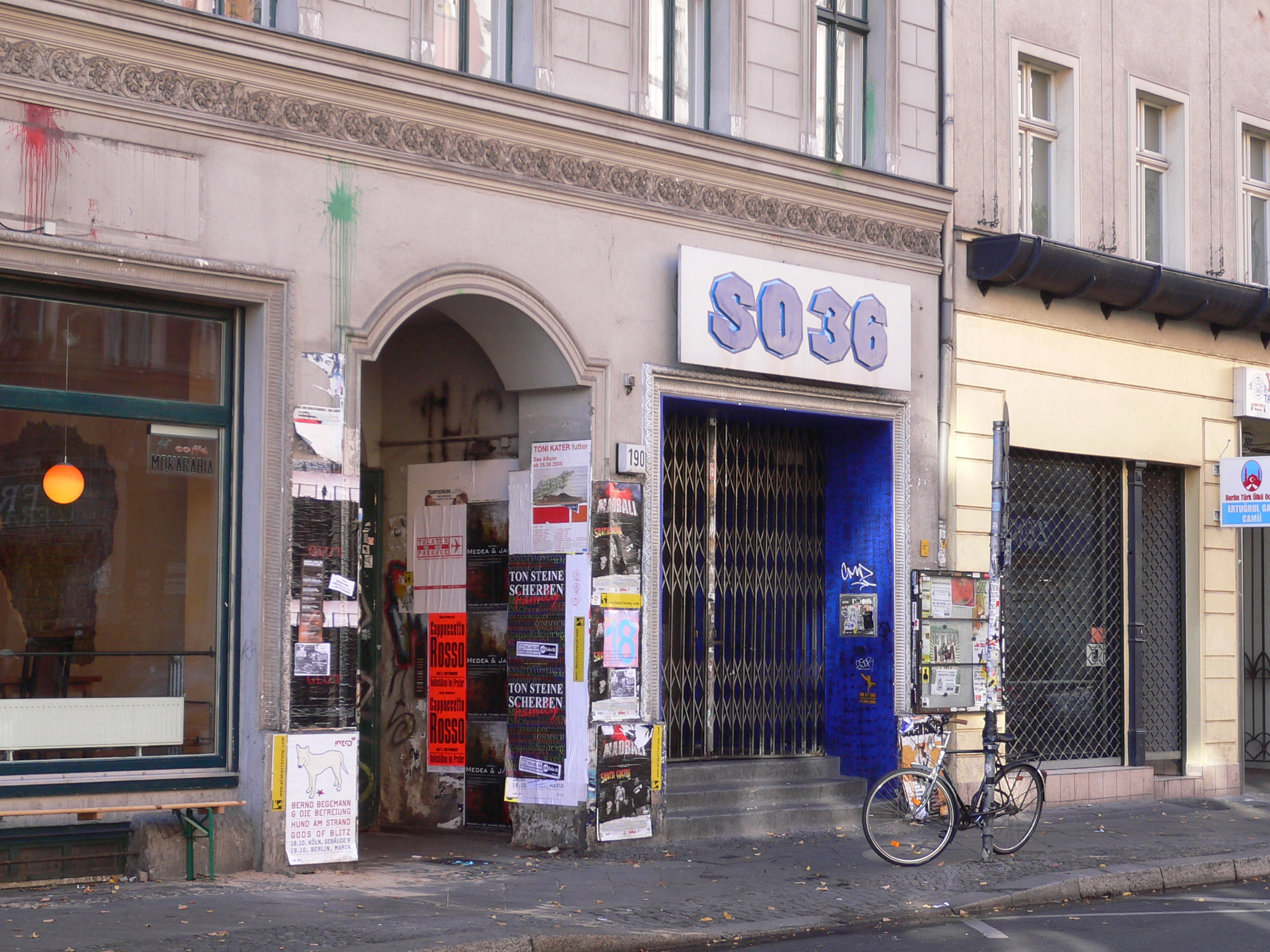
Club SO36, Oranienstraße 190, an anchor of queer, "alternative" culture

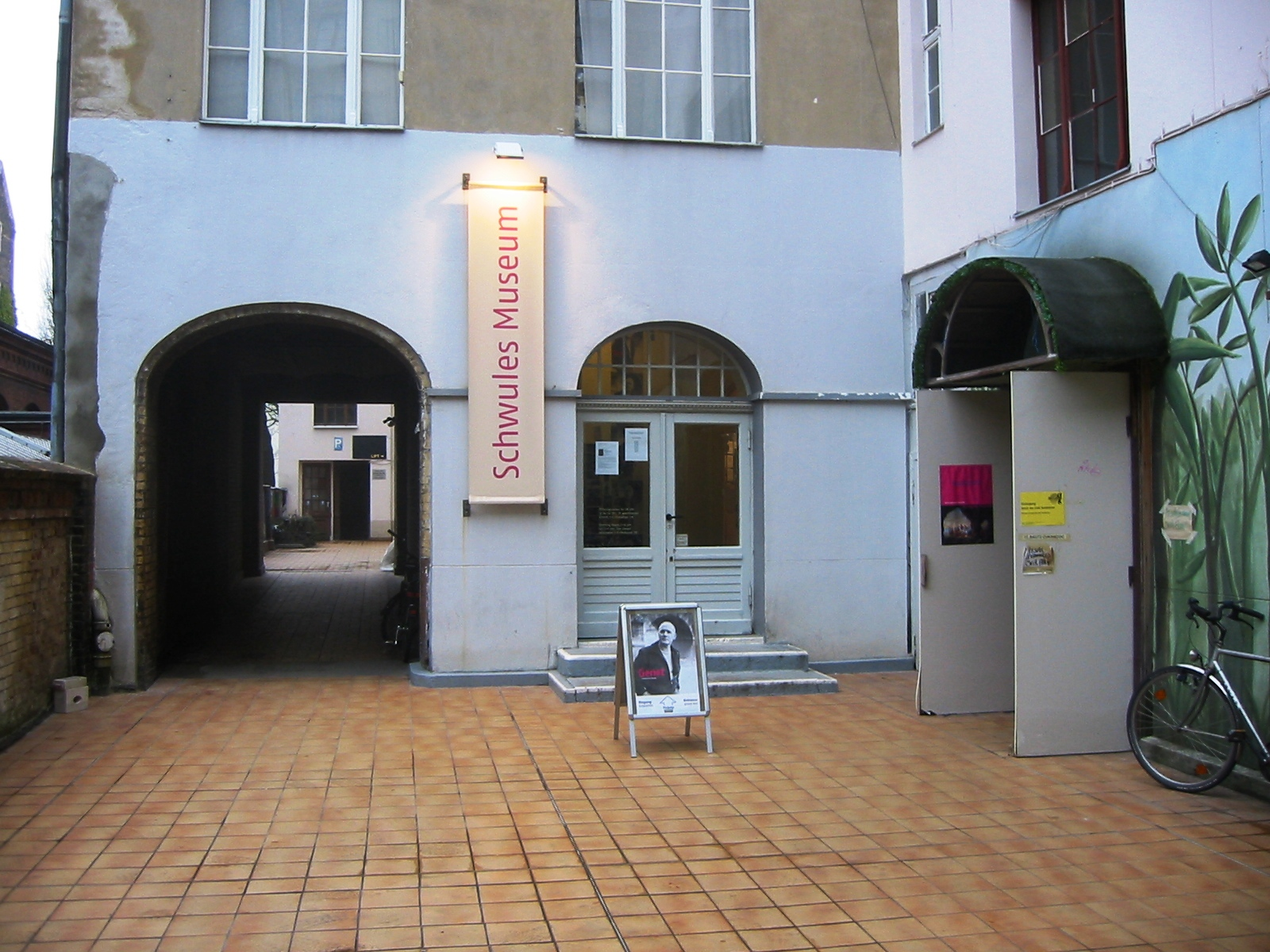
Entrance to Schwules Museum*'s former Kreuzberg location 1988 - 2013

Südblock café & event space, founded by activist Tülin Duman, Richard Stein and others

=== Prenzlauer Berg ===
The East German Homosexuelle Interessengemeinschaft Berlin (English: Homosexual Interest Group Berlin) was formed in 1973 not long after the West German HAW (Homosexuelle Aktion Westberlin ) (founded 1971), and both groups were in close contact. Members of both groups shared a common cause in working for lesbian and gay liberation.

Most in the East and West were also interested in reforming socialism, and the societies they lived in - Marxist–Leninist "actually existing socialism" in the East, and liberal, social-democratic capitalism in the West. This fact brought the HIB and the HAW to the attention of East German State Security Service and the West German Verfassungsschutz respectively. Both were conceived after a screening of Rosa von Praunheim's 1971 film It Is Not the Homosexual Who Is Perverse, But the Society in Which He Lives (German: Nicht der Homosexuelle ist pervers, sondern die Situation, in der er lebt), albeit in different places and with about 2 years between them, but with some of the same members of the audience. Some of the West German activists were also present at the private East Berlin screening in 1973.

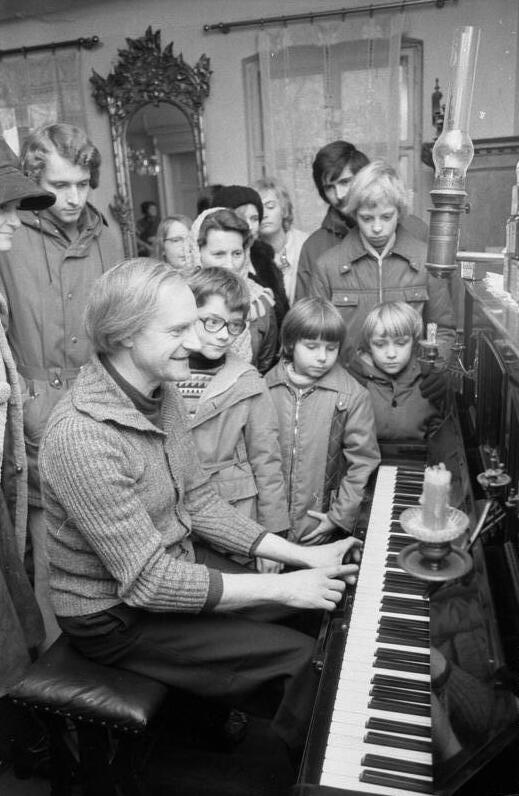
Charlotte v. Mahlsdorf demonstrating pianola to a school group (1977)

Charlotte von Mahlsdorf, an educator and trans rights pioneer, created the Gründerzeutmuseum (Gründerzeit, a period of rapid industrialization and economic growth in Germany between 1873 and 1890) in the former manor house in Berlin-Mahlsdorf. She was an organizer of the LGBTQ rights movements in East and West Germany, as well as during the period after the political turn-around in the GDR. She salvaged and restored the Mulackritze and its reconstruction on the premises of her Gründerzeitmuseum. The small early 20th century bar and brothel had originally been located at Mulackritze 15 in Berlin's historically poorest and historically Jewish district, the Scheunenviertel, just north-west of Alexanderplatz.

In the Mulackritze, the "Hurenstube", a room set aside in a small bar or private flat to provide a bit of privacy when engaging in sex work, was still visible. The little bar is still on display in Charlotte von Mahlsdorf's museum, which was also her place of residence throughout her life. Because renting a space for a meeting or a function was difficult in East Germany (unless it was for a company party or some other officially sanctioned purpose), Frau von Mahlsdorf hosted many meetings of the HIB and other queer-related events. Von Mahlsdorf's museum and grounds are still open to the public.

The Sonntags-Club (English: Sunday Club) – an event, information and counselling center for lesbians, gay men, bisexuals, trans people, allies, and other interested parties – was formed in 1987. In the 1990s, the Sonntags-Club became a registered association under German law (German: eingetragener Verein).

A major obstacle in East German LGBTIQ+ people's lives was the distribution of housing. In as much as a person's income did not decide how, or whether or not a person was housed, some system of housing distribution had to be devised. East German decision-makers decided that it should be along the lines of who was planning to start a family. When these policies were made, "family" meant a woman and a man who married and produced children. There are rumors to this day that young people would conceive a child precisely in order to be "forced" to marry and thereby become eligible for their own flat. How often that actually was the reason for having a child is not statistically studied, but East German adults became parents at a significantly younger age.

This was not the only reason young East Germans chose to have children at a younger age than their counterparts in the West. There were many ways in which having children was simply easier and less of an existential risk in the East than in the West. This had the effect that many LGBTQ East Germans had children, and either had been (or still were) married to someone of the other sex when they began to self-identify as LGBTQ. The implication of the housing dilemma for queer people in East Germany was that the opportunity to move out of one's parents' home was in direct conflict with the possibility of living a non-heteronormative life. This explains in part the allure of the Prenzlauer Berg "alternative" scene for queer people.

It was possible to squat and stay with other similarly-minded people while remaining officially residing with one's parent or spouse until a workaround could be found. The East German environmental movement was very active in Prenzlauer Berg. Their Umwelt-Bibliothek archives are still curated by the Zion Church. Churches in East Germany were in a special position to provide meeting space for various purposes, so Lutheran churches like the Gethsemane Church in Prenzlauer Berg or the St. Elizabeth's Church in nearby Spandauer Vorstadt hosted meetings of the Kirche von Unten movement of the mid-to-late 1980s.

Kirche von Unten was vital to the critical movements that eventually broke the power monopoly of the SED, the state party of East Germany, though many activists were similarly critical of the West as they were of Erich Honecker's "actually existing socialism", and had hoped for a reform of "their" state, the GDR, more than the absorption of the GDR by West Germany, which took place with the German reunification in 1990. After 1990, many clubs, bars, and underground parties sprang up along the streets and alley ways of Berlin-Prenzlauer Berg.

Prenzlauer Berg

Sonntags-Club at Greifenhagener Straße 29

Greifbar, Wichertstr. 10, a popular gay bar opened in the 1990s

The Midnight Sun, then Stahlrohr 2.0, then end of an era

Collectives Schwankende Weltkugel and Café Morgenrot, Kastanienallee 85

Art in front of the Tuntenhaus, Kastanienallee 85

=== Friedrichshain ===
The former East Berlin borough of Friedrichshain has a queer history somewhat similar to Prenzlauer Berg, to which it is somewhat analogous in many ways, were it not for the Stalin era prestige project Karl-Marx-Allee (1949-1961 Stalinallee) which runs north–south through the neighborhood, dividing it down the middle. The "workers' palaces" on Karl-Marx-Allee were reserved for meritable citizens of the "workers' and peasants' state" East Germany, in stark contrast to the buildings behind them on both sides.

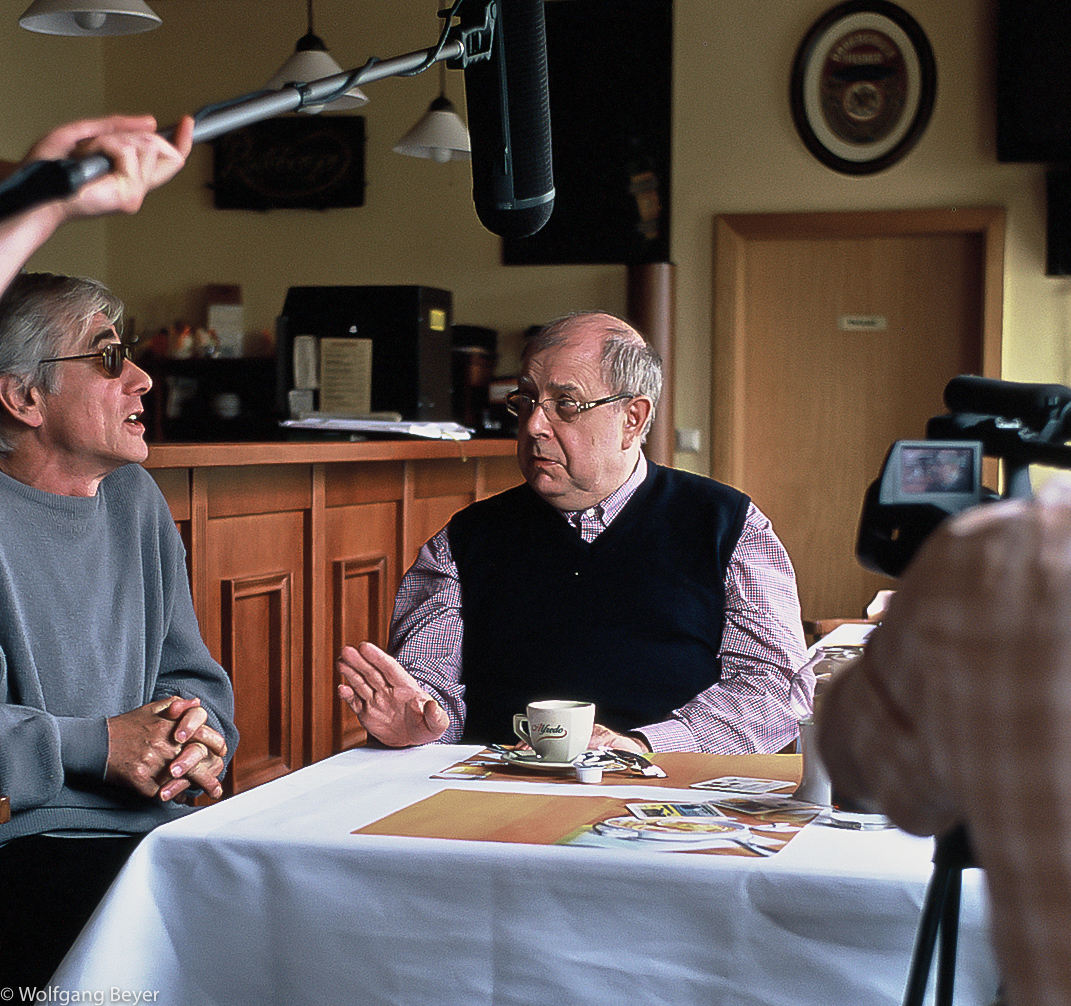
Christian Pulz (middle) and Eduard Stapel (left) in an interview (2011) with filmmakers Jochen Hick and Andreas Strohfeldt, during the making of the film Unter Männern – schwul in der DDR

In Friedrichshain, a further major impulse in the East German lesbian and gay movement arises in the context of the East German peace movement of the late 1970s and early 1980s. After having read Martin Siems' Coming out: Hilfen zur homosexuellen Emanzipation, former seminarian Christian Pulz, theologian Eduard Stapel, and Matthias Kittlitz formed the first "'Arbeitskreis Homosexualität' in der Evangelischen Studentengemeinde" (English: "Work-group Homosexuality" in the Lutheran Students' Congregation) in Leipzig. First contacts between future members were made while "cottaging" at a "tea room" near Leipzig City Hall. Meetings were held in Christan Pulz's flat in Leipzig until Pulz relocated to East-Berlin in 1983, where he continued to participate in the East German lesbian and gay movement as well as the East German peace, environmentalism and human rights movements (Opposition und Widerstand in der DDR).

Upon arriving in Berlin in 1983, Pulz founded an informal gay organization and inquired with several church communities about the use of their space for meetings. In the Spring of 1983, Pulz turned to the peace work group of the Church of the Samaritan in Berlin-Friedrichshain (Samariterkirche (Berlin)). Though there was some support from members of the parish, no separate gay work group was established initially, the reason being the (logistical as nd political) pressure which already existed on the church community due to the peace work group and the so-called "Blues Masses" (Blues-Messe); Blues, rock, and punk church services already being held at the church. In spite of this temporary setback, lesbian and gay activists remained in contact with the church community, and in April 1984, the first formal meeting of the Schwulen- und Lesbenarbeitskreise der DDR (English: Gay and Lesbian Work Group in the GDR) took place in the Samariterkirche (Berlin).

Christian Pulz organized the first public LGBT demonstration, sometimes hailed as the first Christopher Street Day, in the GDR. The event took the form of a meeting on May 21, 1983 at the Sachsenhausen Memorial and Museum. Thirteen participants attended and were briefly detained by members of the Ministry for State Security. This demonstration was the first LGBT protest demonstration (and the first known commemoration of the persecution of homosexuals under Nazism) by gays and lesbians in the GDR.

The protesters left the following entry in the Sachsenhausen Memorial's guest book:

"Today we commemorate the homosexual prisoners who were murdered in Sachsenhausen concentration camp. We were very much saddened that we didn't learn anything about their fate here."

In 1983, at the Church of the Samaritan's peace workshop, the group around Christian Pulz first appeared publicly under the motto "Lieber ein warmer Bruder, als ein kalter Krieger" (English: Better to be a "warm brother" (German pejorative for "gay man"), than a Cold Warrior). The slogan reverses a derisive remark made publicly by West German politician Franz Josef Strauss in 1970 in which Strauß expressed his conviction that it would be better to be a Cold Warrior. At this peace workshop, the group met Pastor Walter Hykel from the Philippus Chapel in Berlin-Alt-Hohenschönhausen. The first meeting of the work group took place at the Philippus Chapel during that same year. In this context, the group gave itself the name "Schwule in der Kirche – Arbeitskreis Homosexuelle Selbsthilfe" (English: Gays in the Church - Homosexual Self-Help Work Group), and Ulrich Zieger wrote the group's political position paper Zur Schwulen Realität in der DDR (English: On gay reality in the GDR).

With the assistance of Bärbel Bohley and Pastor Christa Sengespeick, the group turned to the Bekenntniskirche (Berlin) church in Alt-Treptow. The church was spacious, close to the city center, and the church council had confirmed the group as an official work group. The parish pastor Werner Hilse was a committed ally to the group.

As reform and protest movements inside East Germany gained momentum in the mid to late 1980s, so too did the disruptive, repressive and surveillance activities of the East German Ministerium für Staatssicherheit (MfS) colloquially known as Stasi, East Germany's secret police. East German activists in particular rested their hopes and expectations on the political changes of the late 1980s and early 1990s. For former East German lesbian and gay activists in particular, the discrepancy between the promises made by West German politicians and Western media and advertising, and the reality of life after the "Wende" is particularly marked. The general tendency in the official historiography to downplay the role of East Germans in the events of the time in favor of praise for the deeds of (primarily Western) politicians and invocation of the ostensible inevitability of this "End of History" as it is sometimes framed, pertains to LGBT East Germans in manifold fashion.

The Lesben- und Schwulenverband Deutschland (LSVD) was founded as the Schwulenverband der DDR (SVD) in East Germany by East German activists.

The neighborhood has gained notoriety for the frictions between far-right hooligans (often coming into the neighborhood from the neighborhoods to the south and east), and Friedrichhain's largely left oriented squatters and dissidents, frictions which date back well before 1990, increase in severity during the 1990s, and continue to smolder to this day (see death of Silvio Meier.)

In some ways, Friedrichshain in East Germany was not unlike the West Berlin sister-borough of Kreuzberg. It too was pressed up against the wall between East and West, just across the River Spree from its sister borough with whom present day Friedrichshain now forms one borough as Friedrichshain-Kreuzberg. Toward the end of the 1990s, the RAW-Friedrichshain, a former Reichsbahn repair depot, becomes a culture space with ever changing projects, and its very own drag bar Zum schmutzigen Hobby. (Note: https://zumschmutzigenhobby.de/) Simon-Dach-Straße's Himmelreich has been serving customers since 2003, (Note: https://www.himmelreich-berlin.de/) and the gay bar Große Freiheit 114 opened in 2005. (Note: https://www.grosse-freiheit-114.de/ Große Freiheit 114)

Since the border between East and West Berlin was opened in November 1989, the police have been trying to make Friedrichshain's squatters pay rent. The struggle between the residents of Mainzer Straße and rent-seeking landlords represented by the local authorities and law enforcement was emblematic for this process, which has not lost its actuality to this day. In October 2020, Berlin's last anaracha-queer-feminist house project, Liebig 34, was forcibly removed from the building they were renting. Local police had assembled a force of approximately 4,000 officers and special forces of the Landeskriminalamt Berlin (Berlin State Office of Criminal Investigations). The twenty members of the collective went quietly and calmly, under applause from their supporters.

Friedrichshain

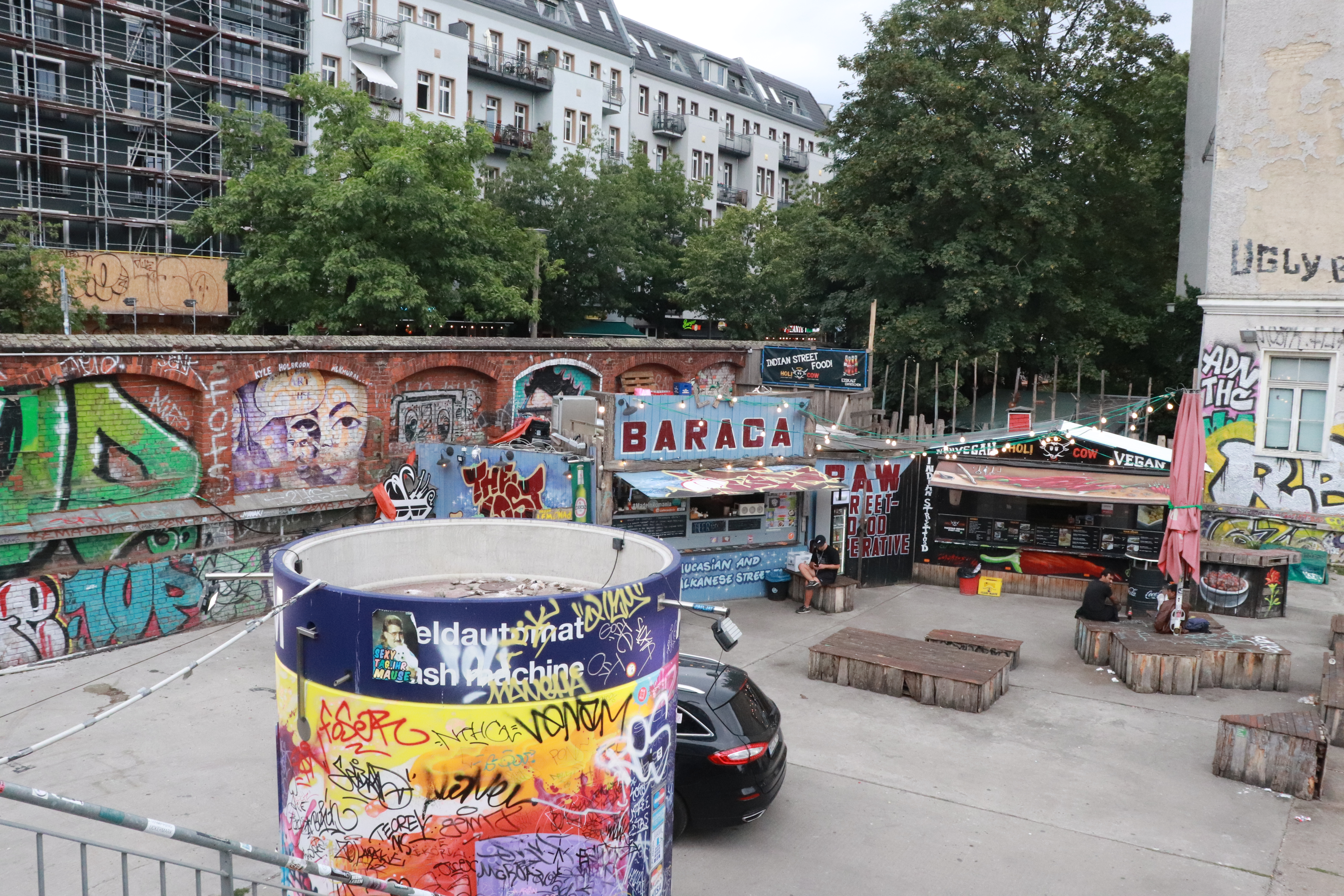
Arts & entertainment complex RAW-Friedrichshain, Warschauer Straße, corner of Revaler Straße

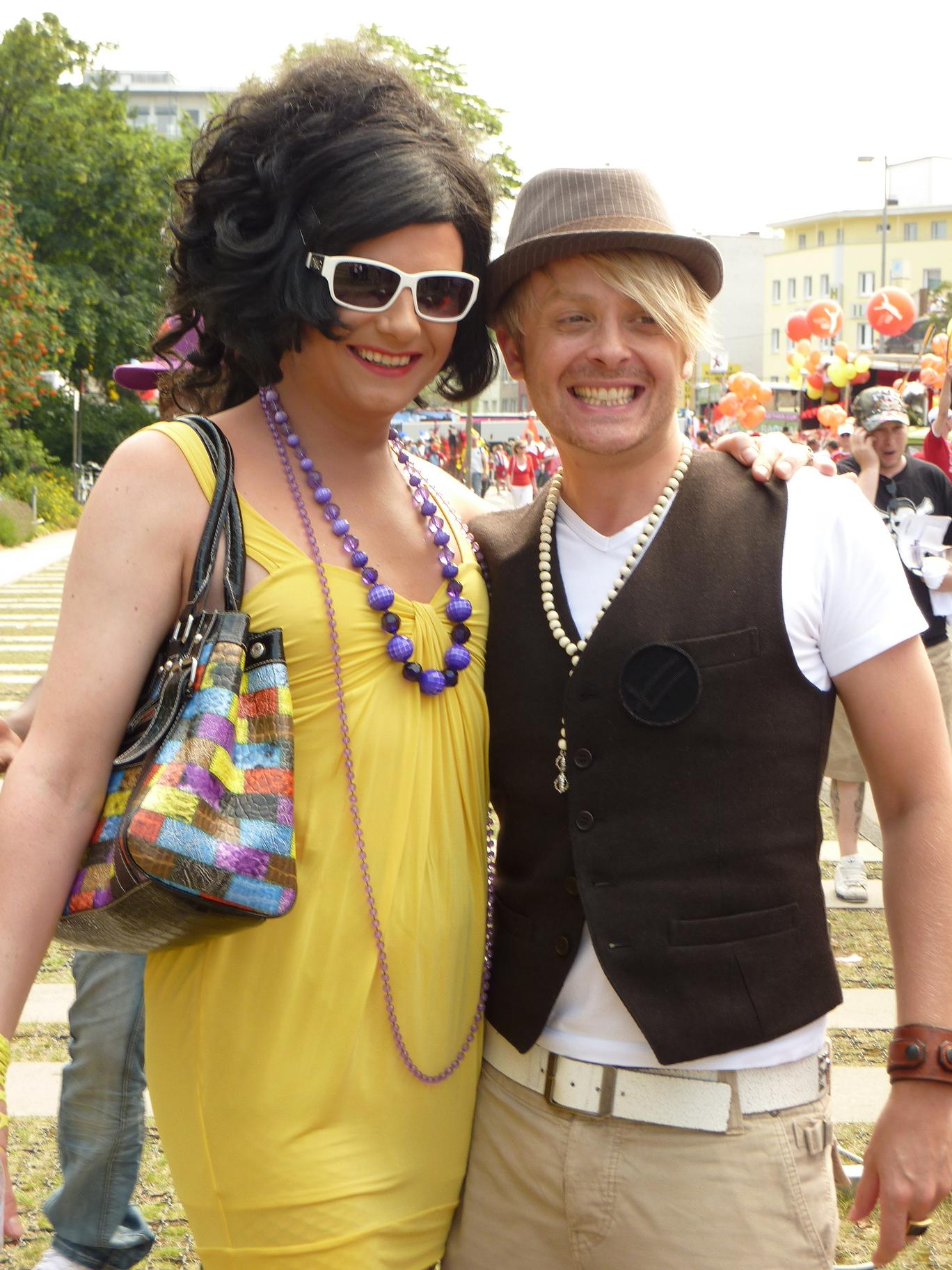
Drag Queen Nina Queer, owner of the bar Zum schmutzigen Hobby, Revaler Str. 99, and Ross Antony British singer/actor

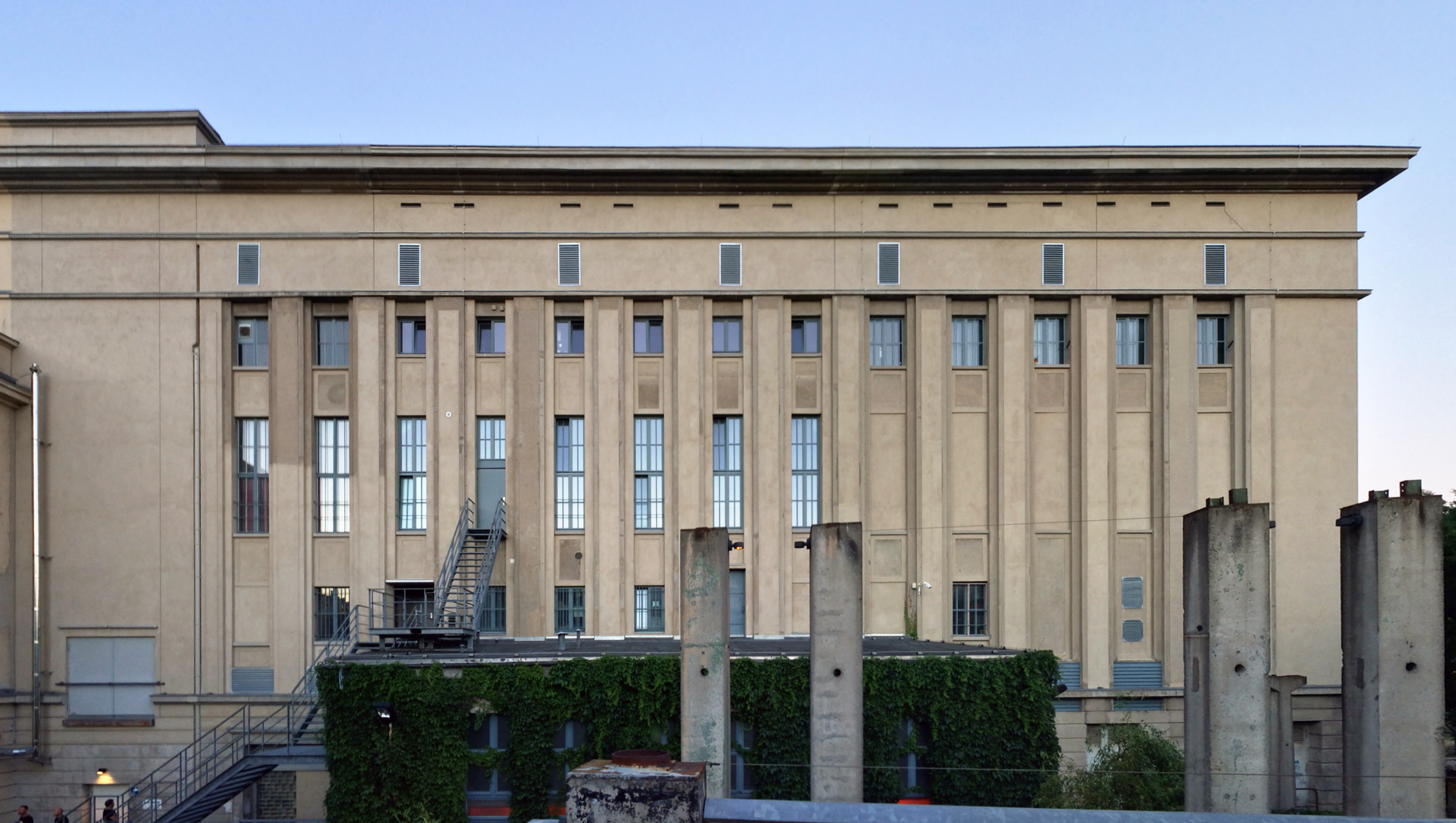
Entrance to Lab.oratory (bottom, left corner)

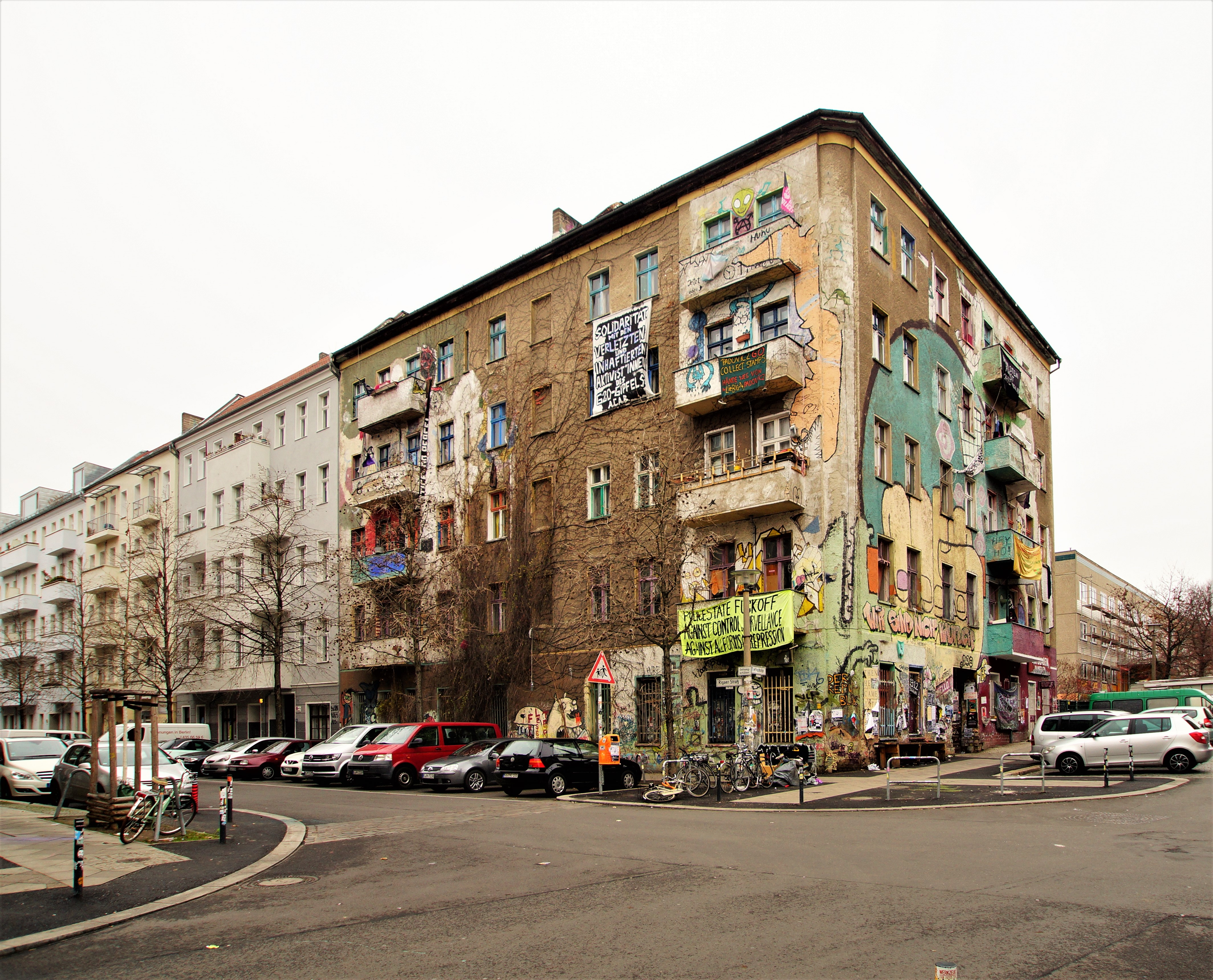
Anarcha-queer-feminist house project Liebig 34 (evicted October, 2020)

=== Neukölln ===
Over the past decade or two, a young and creative queer scene has developed across Weserstraße and southward toward Neukölln City Hall (Rathaus Neukölln). It is the location of historical strip clubs like Ficken3000 on Urbanstraße, as well as the club SchwuZ, which moved to Rollbergstraße 26 in Neukölln in November 2013. But on 23 October 2025, it was announced that the SchwuZ will close down on 1 November 2025, due to financial problems.

Neukölln

Silver Future, Weserstr. 206, intersectional queer feminist bar

K-fetisch, Wildenbruchstr. 86, collectively run coffee house with Küfa and queer feminist (FLINTA*) events

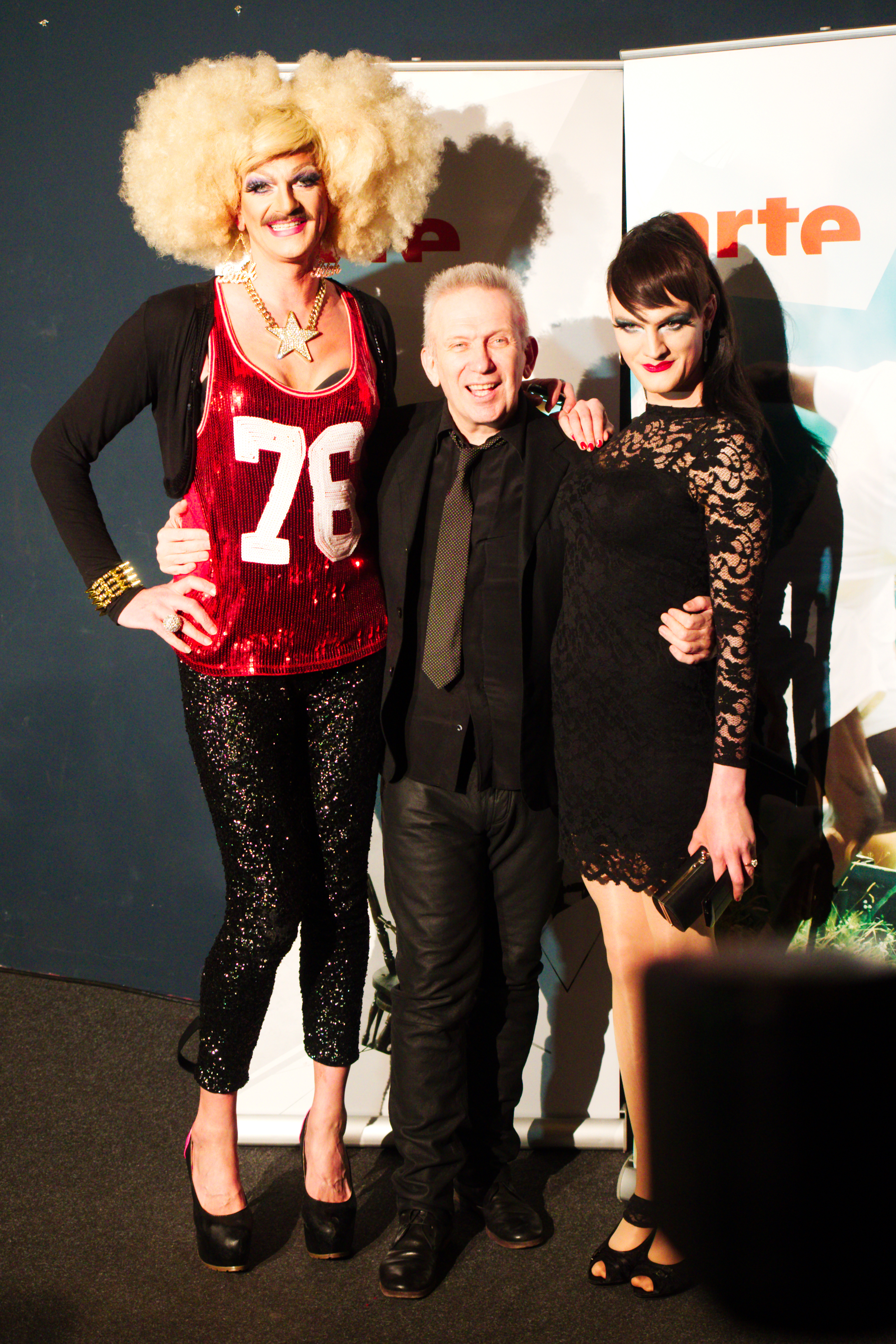
SchwuZ 2015 - Gloria Viagra, Jean-Paul Gaultier, Jackie-Oh Weinhaus

== Queer businesses ==
Rainbow bleachers on Maaßenstraße

A popular turn of phrase (sometimes falsely attributed to Franz von Suppé) is Du bist verrückt mein Kind. Du mußt nach Berlin (English: You are nuts, my Dear. You belong in Berlin, literally: You're crazy, my child. You must go to Berlin) dates back to the 1870s. The quip was not unlikely intended as an insult to Berliners by non-Berliners at first, but the residents of Berlin quickly made the adage their own. The unofficial Berlin local anthem Das ist die Berliner Luft, composed by Paul Lincke in 1904, alludes to the permissive reputation of the city in its second verse:

From Das ist die Berliner Luft, Paul Lincke (1904)
German	translation
... Wie kann man da für wenig Moos den dicken Wilhelm machen? Warum läßt man auf märk'schem Sand gern alle Puppen tanzen?... Das macht die Berliner Luft!	... How is it that, without much cash, you can act the fat Wilhelm? (dissolute & womanizing former king); Why is it that, on Brandenburg's sands, you can paint the whole town red?... Its the Berlin air!

Like many places in the world, not everyone in Berlin has been unreservedly enthusiastic about the city's image as a bastion of personal freedom of expression and open-mindedness. Historically speaking, except for in some very specific branches of business, being associated with overt sexuality was not necessarily good advertising. A company becoming associated with queerness had the potential to be put out of business. This began to change in the early 1990s. The business world, especially retail, began to realize that LGBTQ consumers (gay and bisexual men first and foremost) could be a very lucrative clientele.

Some of the first businesses to put small rainbow-colored stickers in their windows were pharmacies. As anti-retroviral drugs became available, pharmacies were eager to make queer customers aware that they were welcome. Prices for anti-retroviral medication, though high to the present day, were even higher in the early days of anti-retroviral therapy. Before too long, there were rainbow-stickers in the windows of various businesses, often independently of whether the business was queer-owned or operated, whether the business had past or present ties to the community, or whether there was any discernible queer-friendliness about the enterprise.

In today's Berlin, there are very few businesses that do not welcome, and many that actively cater to an LGBTQ clientele. One business sector that often gets overlooked or ignored regardless of location is prostitution. Sex workers are the topic of many art works from Berlin's Weimar period. The word "gay" is a historic euphemism for prostitution. Nevertheless, relationship between parts of the LGBTQ movement and community, and sex-work and sex-workers is historically ambivalent at best.

It is difficult to determine how much queer businesses have contributed to Berlin's €162.95 billion (official) GDP in 2021.

== Media ==
The lesbian magazine L-MAG and the queer magazines Siegessäule and Blu are based in Berlin. These three magazines also contain English articles and cover a wide variety of issues relating to gay life in Berlin and Germany, as well as politics and culture.

== Institutions ==
The Schwules Museum created on December 6, 1985, is the world's first LGBTIQ+ museum. It is located at Lützowstraße 73 on the district border between Schöneberg and the former borough of Tiergarten now incorporated into Berlin-Mitte. The museum is dedicated to archiving, studying, and presenting LGBTIQ+ history, culture and activism locally and around the world, past, present and future. For decades Schwules Museum was a volunteer collective that depended on the time and energy of its members, and on donations from the community. Since 2009, the museum has received additional funding from the Senate of Berlin. Exhibits, events, podium discussions and more approach a vast range of topics and points of view. For example, in partnership with Temple University and Computerspielemuseum (Video Game Museum, Berlin), in 2018-2019 the museum hosted the RAINBOW ARCADE exhibition, which explored the queer history of video games.

== Politics ==
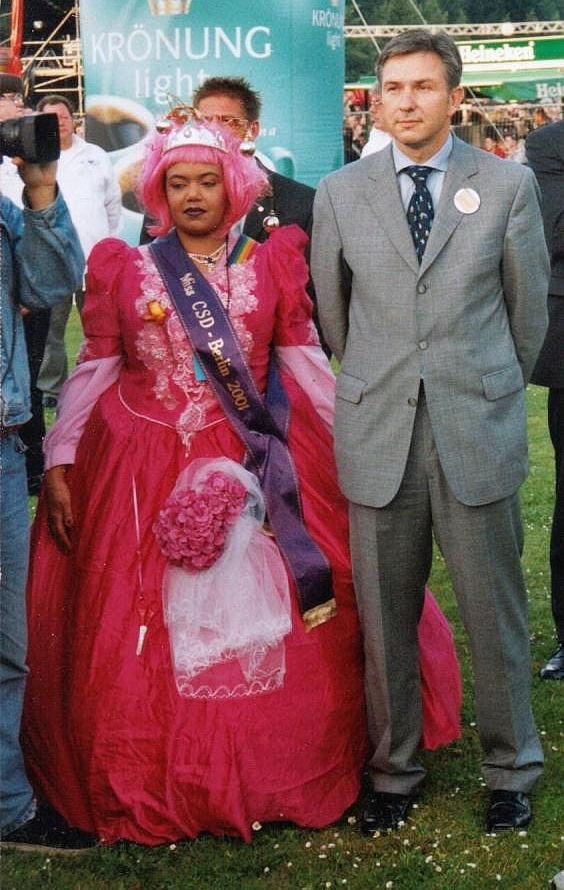
Klaus Wowereit, who served as Governing Mayor of Berlin from 2001 until 2014

Klaus Wowereit was the Governing Mayor of Berlin from 21 October 2001 until 11 December 2014. Wowereit came out during the 2001 elections and stated publicly on a party congress that he was gay, with the now famous sentence "I am gay - and that's good the way it is!". Later on, he described it as the most important sentence in his life. After his outing, Wowereit received a lot of support from fellow party colleagues and the wider public and eventually won the Berlin State Elections of 2001 and remained Governing Mayor of the city for nearly 13 years.

== Festivals ==
Berlin Pride is the gay pride parade in Berlin, the first took place in 1979. Other pride parades in Berlin are Dyke March and Kreuzberg Pride, also known as Transgenialer CSD, which ran from 1997 to 2013. In 2019, two alternative pride events are Libertarian CSD and Radical Queer March.

Other festivals include Folsom Europe, Easter Berlin, the Hustlaball and the Yo!Sissy Queer Music Festival.

== Notable residents ==
- Bini Adamczak (born 1979) – feminist, writer on communism and queer politics
- Seyran Ateş (born 1963) – lawyer and women's right activist, founder of the liberal Ibn Rushd-Goethe Mosque (which expressly welcomes LGBTIQ+ worshipers) in Berlin, imam (one of the world's very few female imams)
- Norbert Bisky (born 1970) – Berlin-based artist and figurative painter
- Tabea Blumenschein (1952–2020) – actress and artistic polymath who starred in Ulrike Ottinger's 1979 film Ticket of No Return (German: Bildnis einer Trinkerin)
- Adolf Brand (1874–1945) – publisher of Der Eigene (The Unique) the first gay journal in the world, published Berlin, 1896–1932
- Michael Brynntrup (born 1959) – media artist and pioneer of queer cinema
- Horst Buchholz (1933–2003) – actor, voice-over artist, the German Alain Delon
- Heiner Carow (1929–1997) – film director, screenwriter, director of Coming Out (1989), the first East German LGBT-themed film
- Martin Dannecker (born 1942) – sexologist, author, early founder of the German Lesbian & Gay rights movement, co-counder of Queer Nations e.V.
- Vaginal Davis (born 1969) – performing artist, painter, curator, composer, filmmaker, writer (residing in Berlin since 2006)
- Marlene Dietrich (1901–1992) – German-born American actress & singer (grave (Berlin): III. Städtischer Friedhof Stubenrauchstraße, section 17–486)
- Carolin Emcke (born 1967) – award-winning journalist and author, political theorist and activist
- Selli Engler (aka Selma Engler) (1899–1972) – lesbian activist of the 1920s and 1930s, writer, publisher of Die BIF – Blätter Idealer Frauenfreundschaften (Papers on Ideal Women Friendships)
- Frederick the Great (1712–1786) – Prussian ruler and expansionist, enlightened despot
- Matthias Freihof (born 1961) – television actor and director, played the role of Philipp Klarmann in Coming Out (Heiner Carow, 1989), the first East German LGBT-themed film (interview in German with Matthias Freihof)
- Matthias Frings (born 1953) – journalist, TV presenter and writer, well known to TV audiences in Germany as one of the moderators of the 1990s show Liebe Sünde–title is a pun on queer icon Zarah Leander sung song "Kann denn Liebe Sünde sein?" (English: can love be a sin?)
- Helga Sophia Goetze (aka Helga Sophia) (1922–2008) – artist, writer, sex-positive feminist, from 1983–early 2000s she held hourly "Ficken ist Frieden" (fucking is peace) vigils near the Kaiser Wilhelm Memorial Church (grave (Berlin): Alter St.-Matthäus-Kirchhof) (Note: EFEU e.V. list of graves of prominent Women in Alter St.-Matthäus-Kirchhof, Berlin-Schöneberg)
- Lotte Hahm (aka Charlotte Hedwig Hahm) (1890–1967) – prominent lesbian and trans activist from the 1920 through the Nazi period into the mid-1960s, organizer, club manager.
- O. E. Hasse (1903–1978) – film actor, director (grave in Berlin: Waldfriedhof Dahlem)
- Magnus Hirschfeld (1868–1935) – sexologist, reformer, founder of the WhK
- Christopher Isherwood (1904–1986) – British-American author
- Manuela Kay (born 1964) – author and journalist
- Ilse Kokula (born 1944) – teacher, author, lesbian activist
- Elmar Kraushaar (born 1950) – journalist, early gay activist & AIDS activist
- Kevin Kühnert (born 1989) – politician (SPD), general secretary of the Social Democratic Party of Germany (SPD) and member of the Bundestag representing Berlin-Tempelhof-Schöneberg (since 2021)
- Dirk Kummer (born 1966) – actor, plays the role of Matthias in Coming Out (Heiner Carow, 1989), the first East German LGBT-themed film
- Kitty Kuse (1904–1999) – helped Gertrude Sandmann hide from the Nazis in WWII, co-founder of the group L 74 (Lesbos 1974), writer/publisher lesbian periodical UKZ – Unsere kleine Zeitung (grave (Berlin): Alter St.-Matthäus-Kirchhof)
- Klaus Lederer (born 1974) – politician (Die Linke), member of the Abgeordnetenhaus of Berlin (since 2001), deputy mayor and senator for culture and Europe (since 2016)
- Yony Leyser (born 1985) – U.S. born film director living in Berlin
- Audre Lorde (1934–1992) U.S. black, lesbian-feminist writer and activist. During multiple stays in Berlin 1984-1992 strongly influenced German POC, and lesbian-feminist movements, documentary: Audre Lorde – The Berlin Years 1984 to 1992 by Dagmar Schultz, Ria Cheatom, Ika Hügel-Marshall and Aletta von Vietinghoff (2011) Watch trailer on Vimeo
- Marinus van der Lubbe (1909–1934) – Dutch born, young vagrant who under mysterious circumstances admitted to and was executed for setting the Reichstag fire, 1933
- Jeanne Mammen (1890–1976) – painter and illustrator, well known for her illustrations of The Songs of Bilitis (grave (Berlin): III. Städtischer Friedhof Stubenrauchstraße, Columbarium, Urn room 45, No. 97)
- Inge Meysel (1910–2004) – immensely popular and very outspoken actress, came out as bi at age 94 (2004)
- Charlotte von Mahlsdorf (1928–2002) – East German preservationist, trans activist, author (grave (Berlin): Waldkirchhof Mahlsdorf, section: W 402/403/404)
- Erich Mühsam (1879–1934) – poet, playwright, anarchist, revolutionary (grave (Berlin): Waldfriedhof Dahlem)
- Wolfgang Müller (born 1957) – artist, musician, author, co-founder (with Nikolaus Utermöhlen) of the band Die Tödliche Doris, author of the manifesto of the young West Berlin music and art scene Geniale Dilletanten (Merve Verlag, Berlin, 1982) following the 1981 music festival Festival Genialer Dilletanten in the Tempodrom, the book contains contributions by Gudrun Gut, Matthias Roeingh (later known as Dr. Motte), Tabea Blumenschein, Blixa Bargeld and Frieder Butzmann
- Ulrike Ottinger (born 1942) – filmmaker and photographer, well known for her Berlin Trilogy, Ticket of No Return (German: Bildnis einer Trinkerin, 1979), Freak Orlando (1981) and Dorian Grey in the Yellow Press (German: Dorian Grey im Spiegel der Boulevardpresse, 1984), (Ulrike Ottinger's website)
- Rosa von Praunheim (born 1942) – pioneer of queer cinema, activist
- Cristina Perincioli (born 1946) – film director, writer, multimedia producer and author, co-founder of West Berlin's first feminist health center the Feministische Frauen-Gesundheits-Zentrum e.V. Berlin (FFGZ) as Frauenzentrum Westberlin, Hornstraße 2, Berlin-Kreuzberg (former location) in 1973, and 1977 of West Berlin's Rape Hotline in 1977, Perincioli and her partner Cillie Rentmeister are the authors of the German TV film about a lesbian relationship, "Edith und Anna" aired on ZDF in 1975
- Friedrich Radszuweit (1876-1932) – publisher, author and LGBT activist, who was of major importance to the first homosexual movement.
- Hilde Radusch (1903–1994) – resistance fighter, communist and Socialdemocratic politician, women's rights activist, lesbian activist (memorial: Winterfeldt- / Eisenacherstraße) (grave (Berlin): Alter St.-Matthäus-Kirchhof)
- Rio Reiser (aka Ralph Christian Möbius) (1950–1996) – singer / songwriter, lead singer of Ton Steine Scherben, bard of the squatters movement and the Sponti protest movements in West Germany and Western Europe in general in the 1970s and 1980s (grave (Berlin): Alter St.-Matthäus-Kirchhof) (Note: EFEU e.V. map of queer-relevant graves in Alter St.-Matthäus-Kirchhof, Berlin-Schöneberg)
- Cillie Rentmeister (born 1948) – historian, culture scientist and researcher of cultural conditions of women and of gender, 1974-1977 member of Flying Lesbians, Europe's first women's rock band (more about Dr. Rentmeister on feministberlin.de (in German)
- Ernst Röhm (1887–1934) – openly gay, early member of the NSDAP, leader of its paramilitary SA, murdered at Hitler's command in the internal purge, Night of the Long Knives
- Ruth Margarete Roellig (1878–1969) – writer, author of the city guide Berlins lesbische Frauen (1928), Nazi collaborator
- Gertrude Sandmann (1893–1981) artist, lesbian Activist of Jewish background, co-founder of the group L 74 (Lesbos 1974) (Memorial: Eisenacher Straße 89 ) (grave (Berlin): Alter St.-Matthäus-Kirchhof)
- Manfred Salzgeber (1943–1994) – activist, pioneer of queer cinema, founder of Edition Salzgeber, co-founder of the Teddy Award (grave (Berlin): Alter St.-Matthäus-Kirchhof)
- Dagmar Schultz (born 1941) sociologist, filmmaker, publisher professor, maker of films on May Ayim (2007), and Audrey Lorde (2012), co-founder of West Berlin's first feminist health center (Feministische Frauen-Gesundheits-Zentrum e.V. Berlin (FFGZ), Hornstraße 2, Berlin-Kreuzberg (former location))
- Dr. Ursula Sillge (born 1946) – Lesbian activist and sociologist, groundbreaking Lesbian activist in East-Germany, early and erstwhile only Lesbian activist in the Homosexuelle Interessengemeinschaft Berlin (Homosexual Interest Group Berlin, HIB), founding member of the Sonntags-Club, organizer of a 1984 Humboldt University of Berlin Department of Social Sciences study On the Situation of Homophile Citizens in the GDR prompting far reaching changes in the official GDR government stance on LGBT concerns, remaining an important LGBT activist, as well as chronicler and archivist (See: Lila Archiv e.V.) of LGBT history and reality in East and West
- Renée Sintenis (1893–1965) – sculptor, medalist, graphic, creator of the Berlin Bear model for the Berlinale's Golden Bear (grave (Berlin): Waldfriedhof Dahlem)
- Wieland Speck (born 1951) – activist, cinematic polymath, panorama coordinator at the Berlinale, co-founder of the Teddy Award
- Karl Heinrich Ulrichs (1825–1895) lawyer, jurist, journalist, writer, early sexologist, coiner of the term "Unanian", often cited as the "first gay man", Karl-Heinrich-Ulrichs-Straße in Berlin-Schöneberg is named his honor (view on openstreetmap.org)
- Claire Waldoff (1884–1957) – cabaretist and chanteuse
- Anne Will (born 1966) – journalist, television moderator, host of Anne Will on NDR television–the most watched show on German TV in 2021
- Klaus Wowereit (born 1953) – politician (SPD), governing mayor of Berlin (2001–2014)
Residents of Berlin

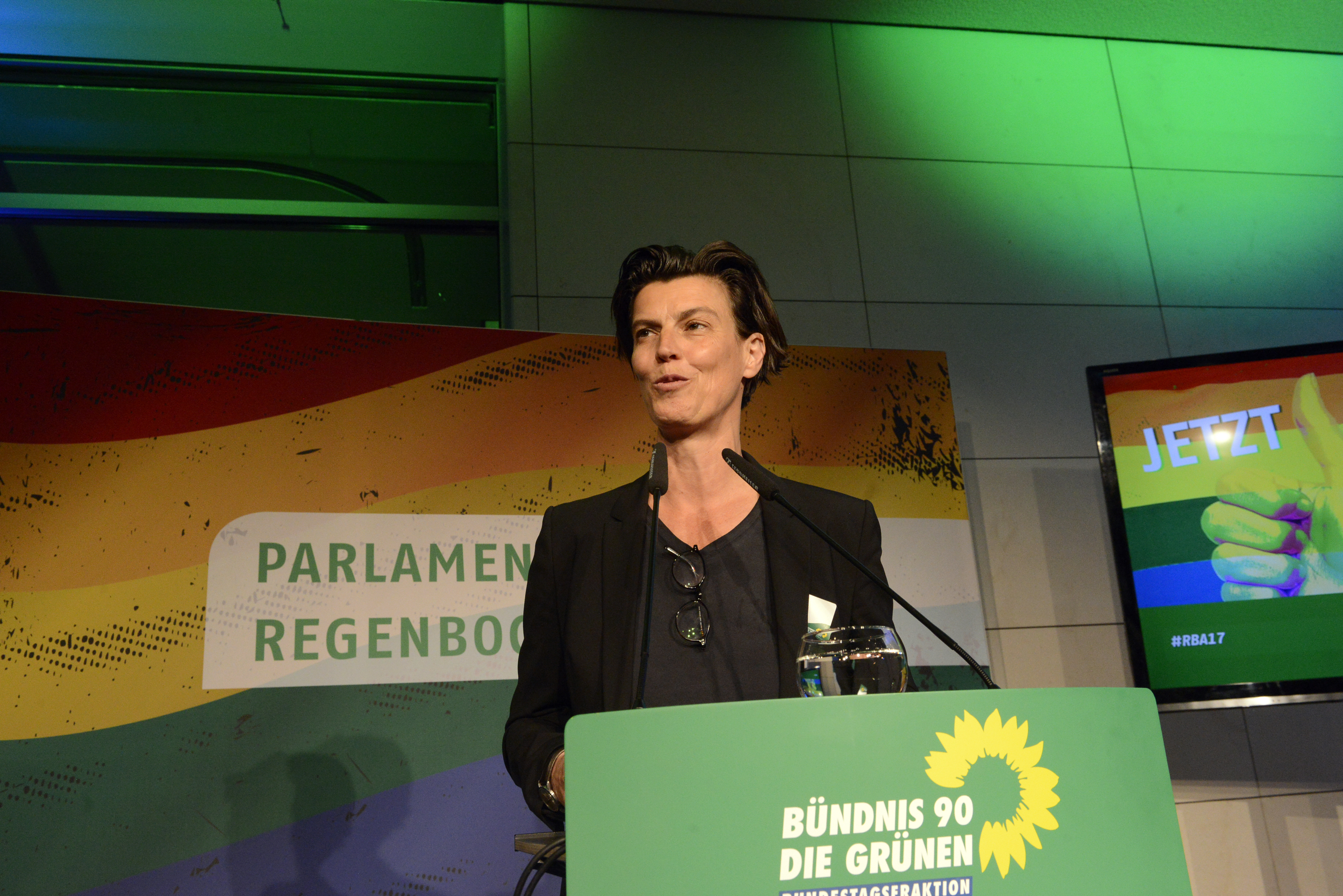
Author Carolin Emcke, Green Party celebration of marriage equality in 2017

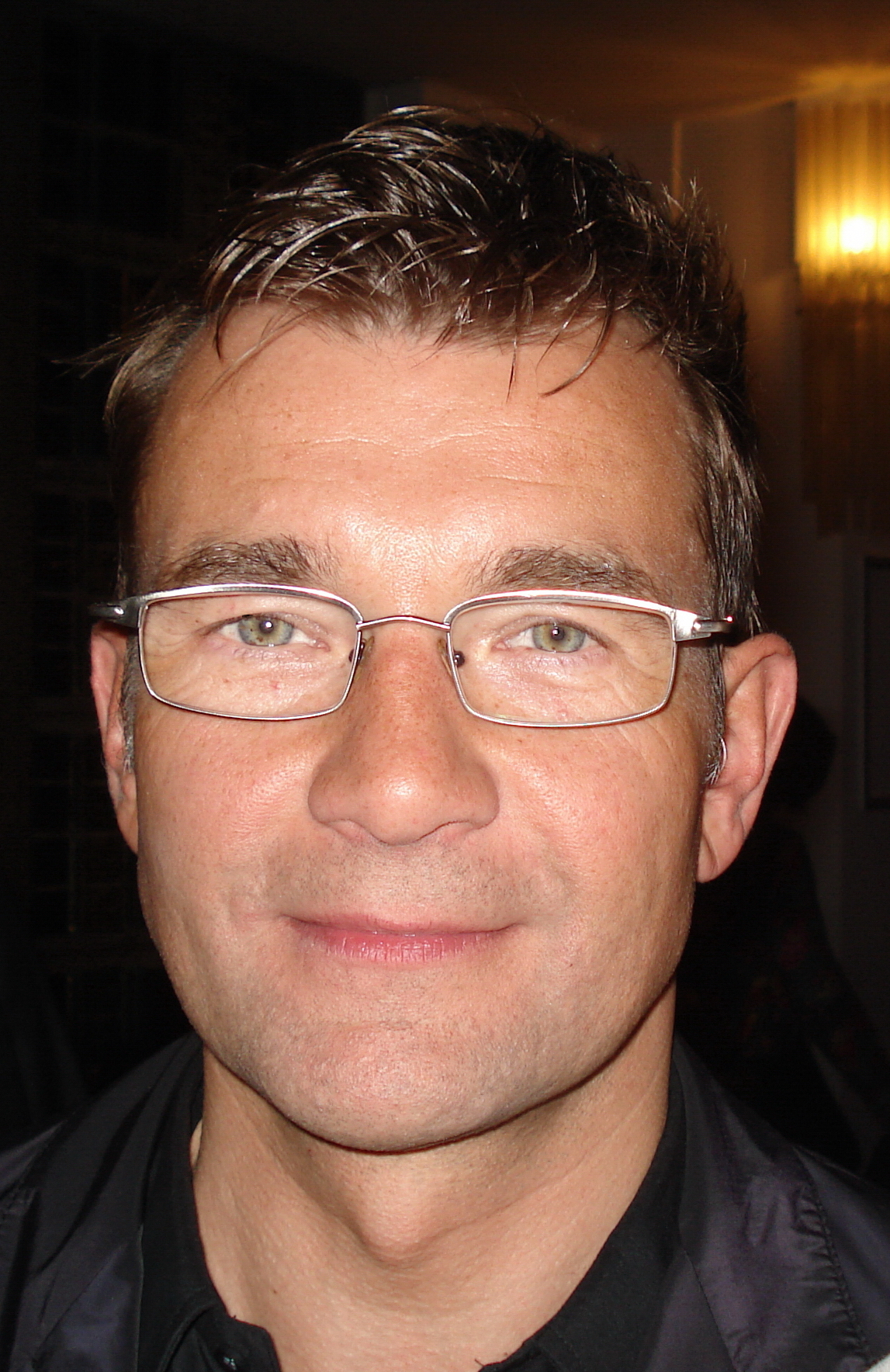
Matthias Freihof at the 25 Years Friedrichstadt-Palast Gala in Berlin in 2009

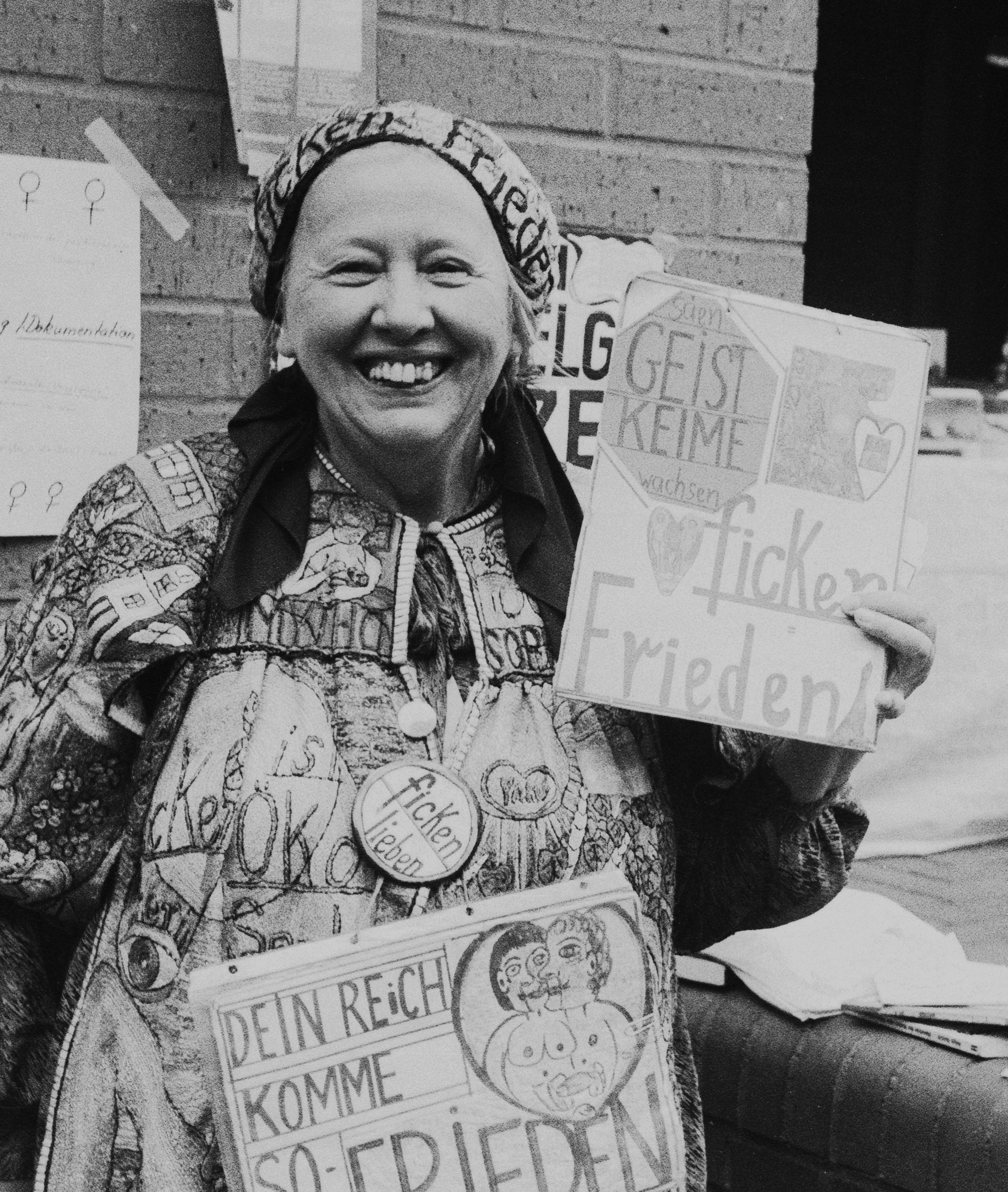
Sex-positive feminist Helga Goetze holding a vigil in 1987

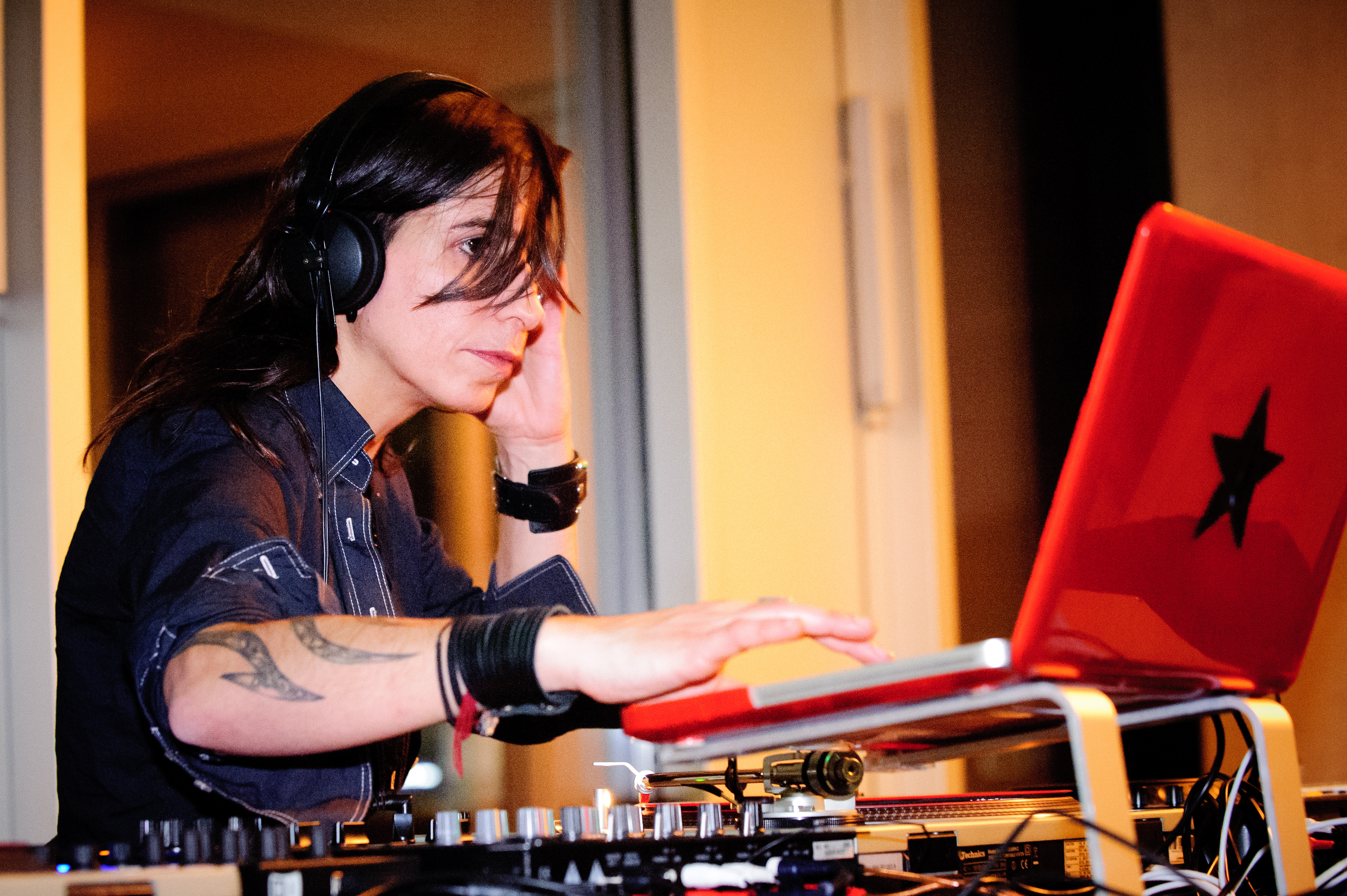
DJane Ipek (İpek İpekçioğlu) at the Anne Klein Women's Prize ceremony in 2012

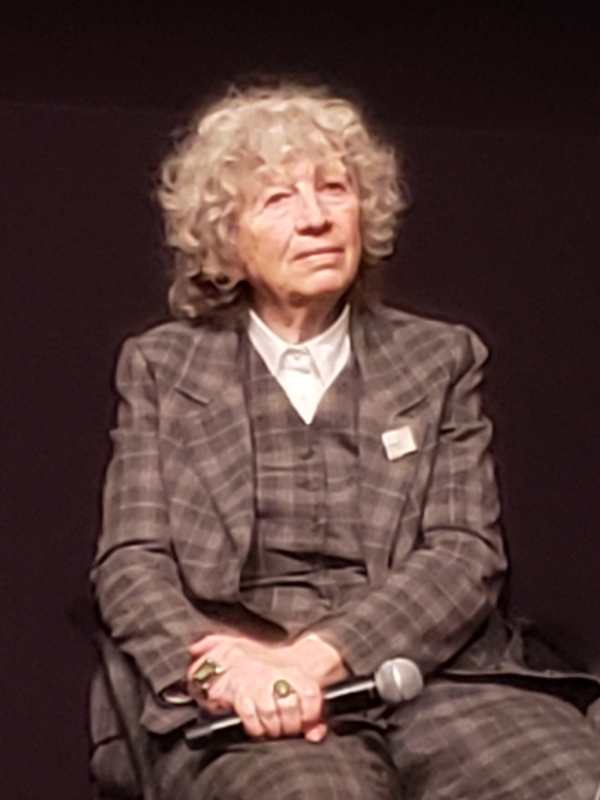
Ulrike Ottinger, Q&A session for Ticket of No Return, BAMPFA, University of California, Berkeley, 2019

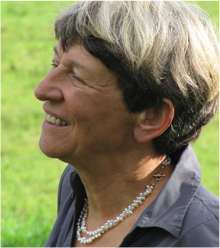
Cristina Perincioli in 2011

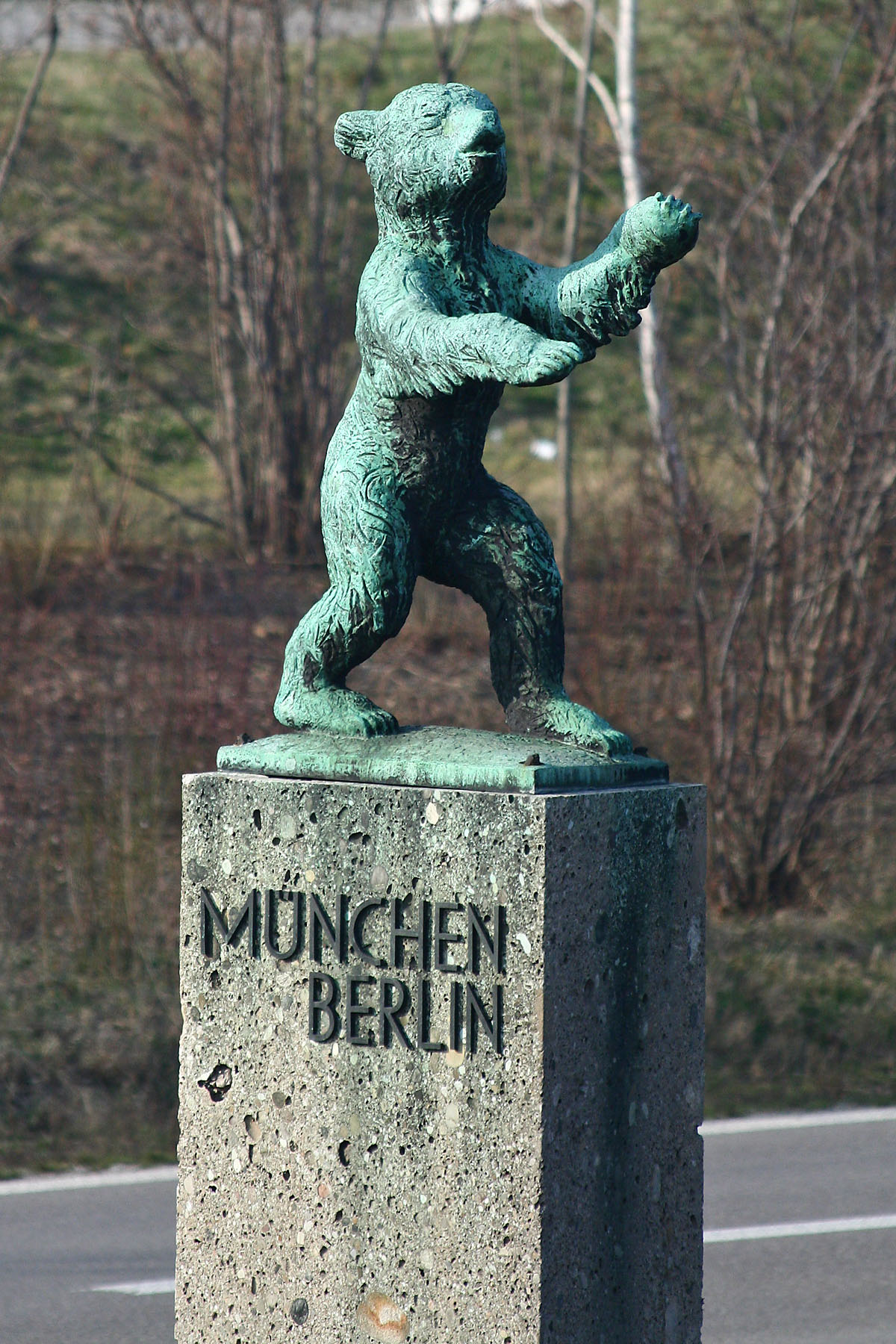
Sintenis bear (Bundesautobahn 9). Model for the Berlinale Golden Bear

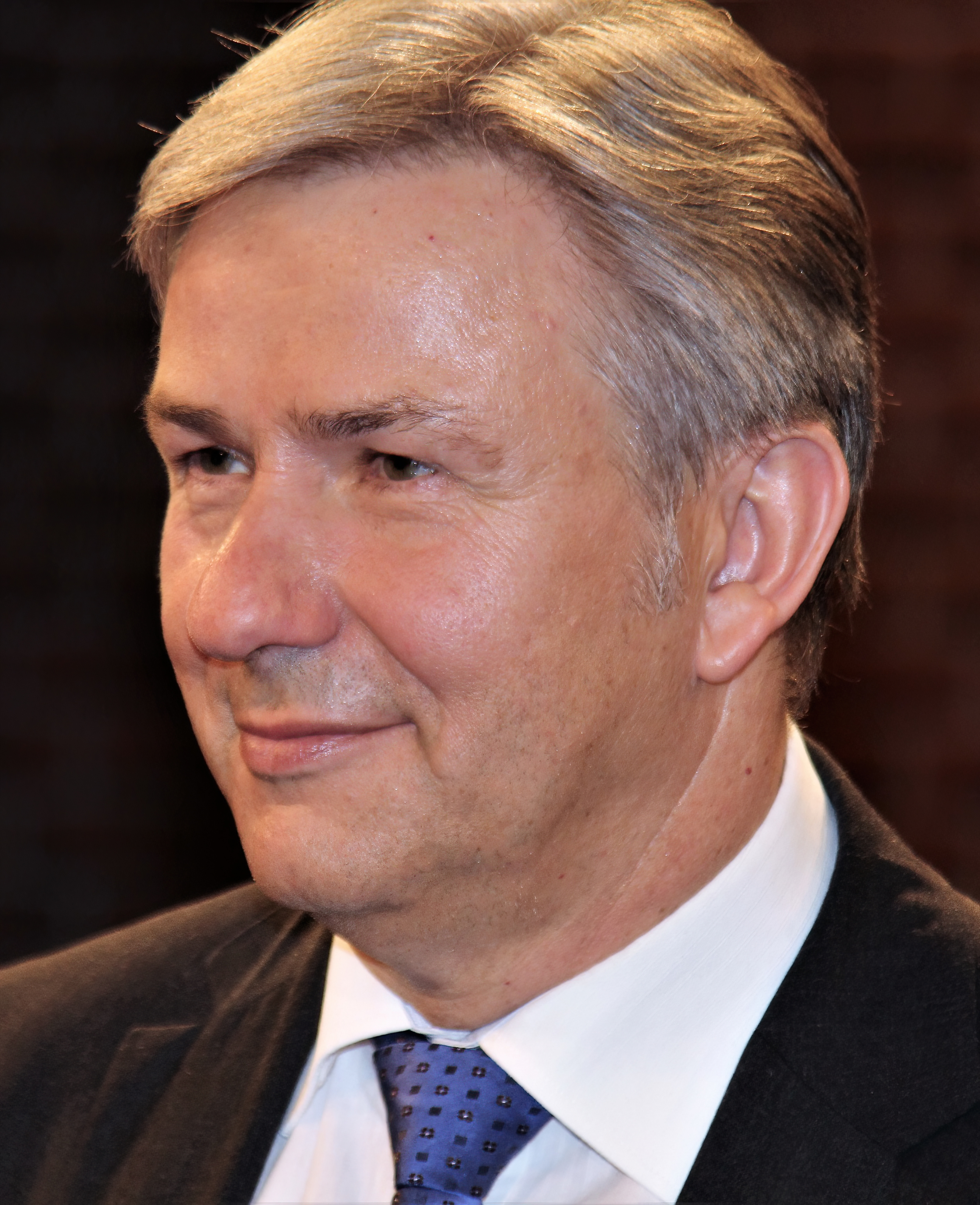
Klaus Wowereit in 2012, Governing Mayor of Berlin (2001-2014)

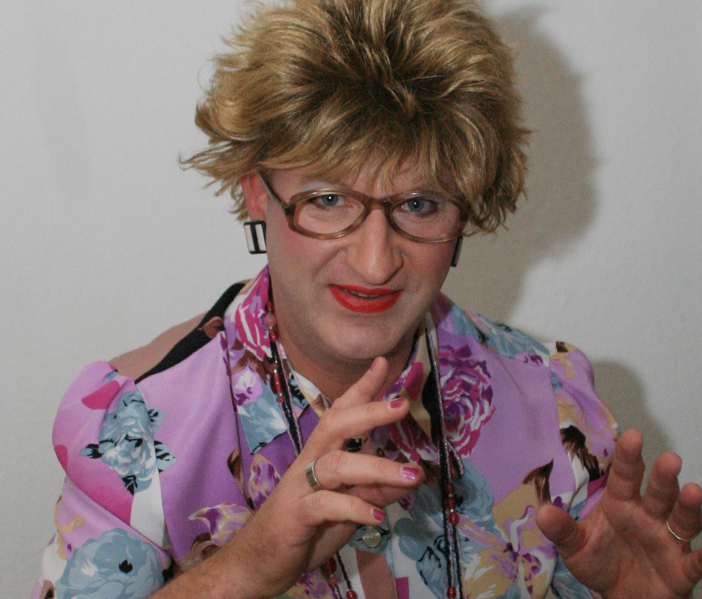
Ades Zabel as Edith Schröder in 2010

== See also ==
- LGBT rights in Germany
- Persecution of homosexuals in Nazi Germany and the Holocaust
- Schwules Museum
