= Elisabethenburg Palace =

- Schloss Elisabethenburg
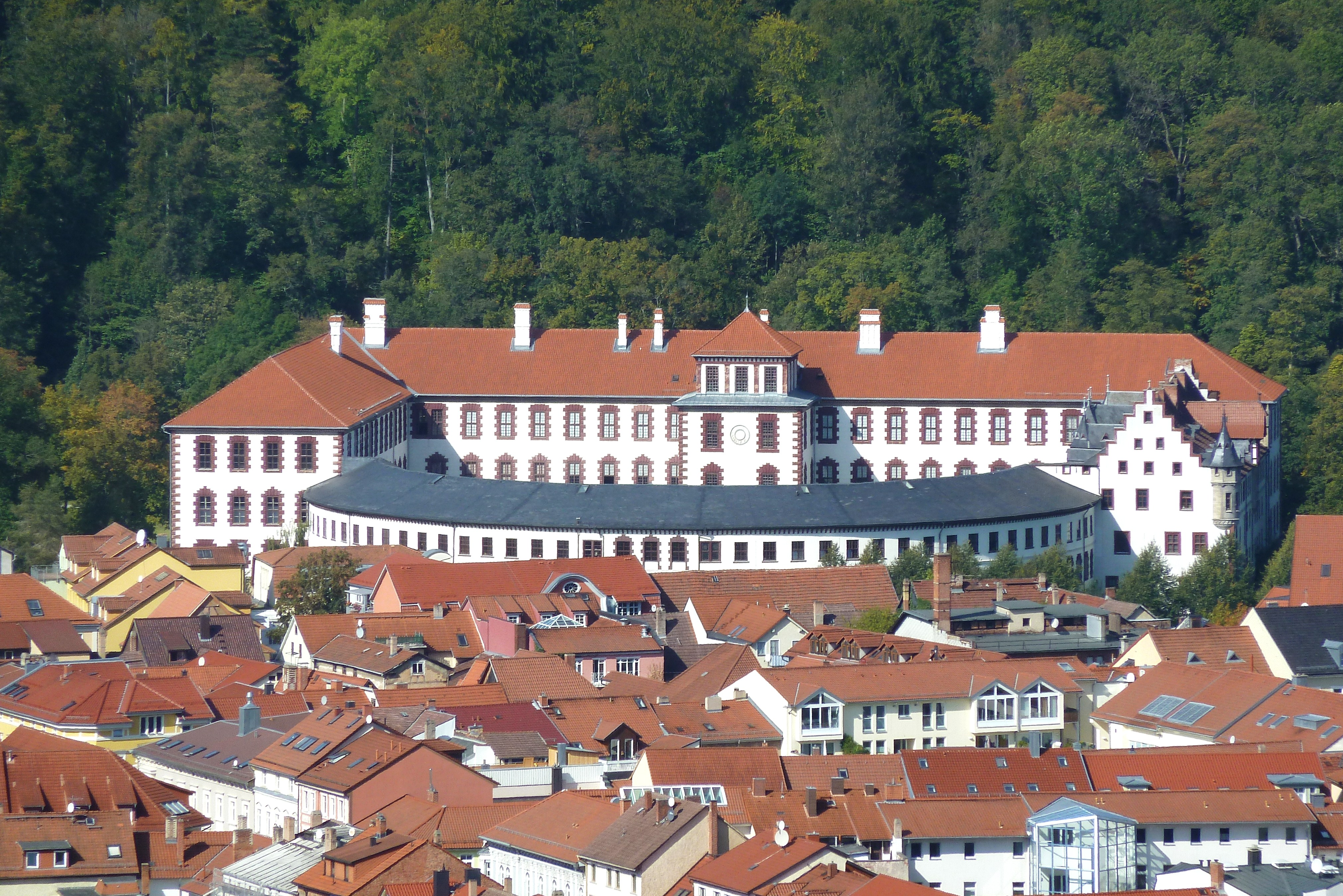

- Location within Thuringia Location within Germany

General information
- Architectural style: originally Baroque some later additions
- Location: Meiningen, Germany
- Coordinates: 50.570°N 10.413°E
- Construction started: 1682
- Completed: 1692
- Client: Bernhard I, Duke of Saxe-Meiningen

Elisabethenburg Palace (German: Schloss Elisabethenburg) is a Baroque palace located on the northwestern edge of Meiningen in Germany. Until 1918 it was the residence of the Dukes of Saxe-Meiningen. The castle now houses the Meininger Museum as well as the Max Reger archives, the Thuringian State Archives, the Max Reger music school, the Johannes Brahms concert hall, a restaurant, the tower Cafe, and the ceremonial rooms of the Meinigen City Council and Registry Office.

== History ==
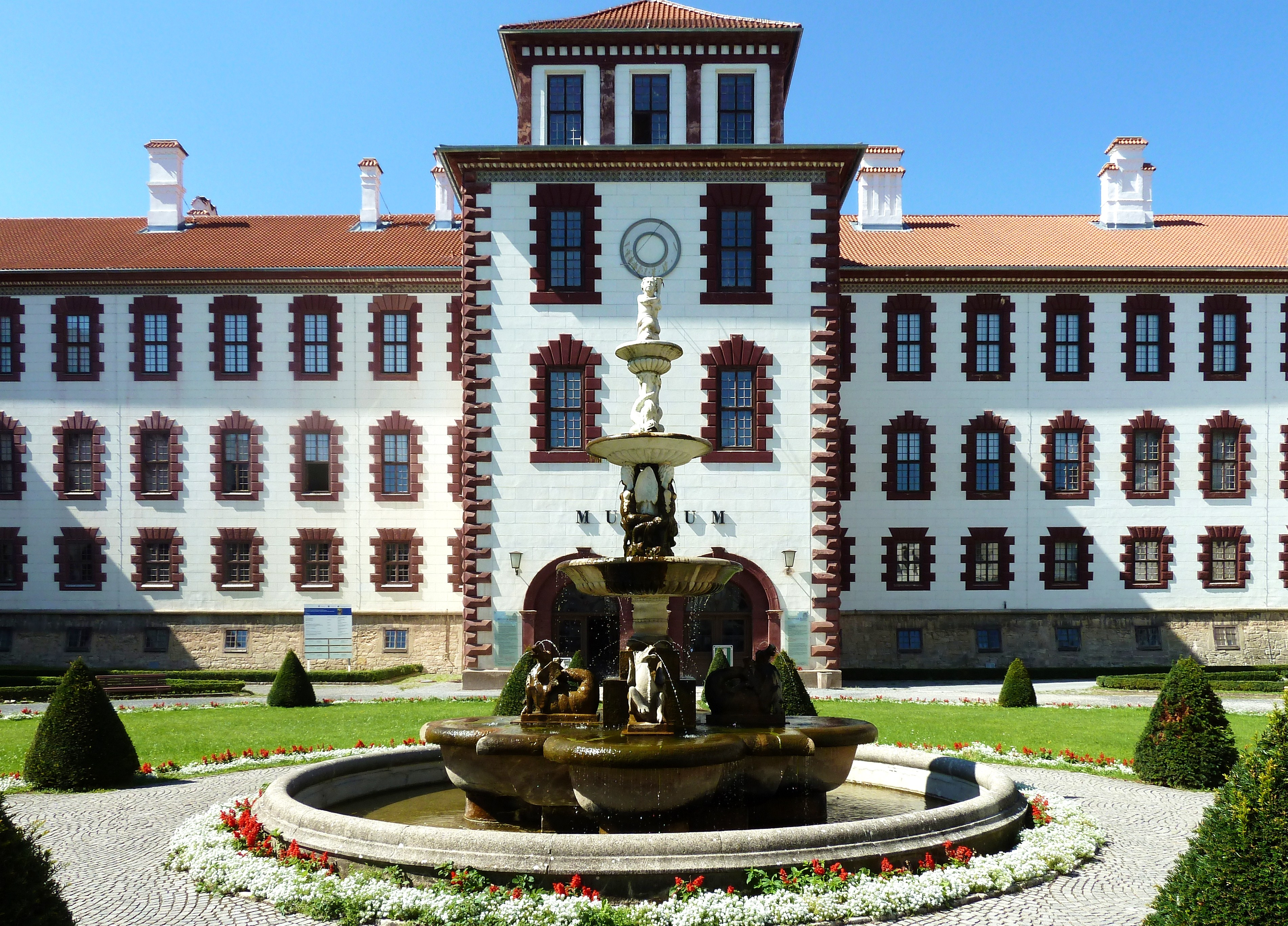
The main entrance of Elisabethenburg Palace

The palace was constructed by Bernard I, the first Duke of Saxe-Meiningen, between 1682 and 1692 on the site of a late-Gothic castle built in 1511, part (Bibrasbau, after Bishop Lorenz von Bibra) which was incorporated into the north wing of the present building. The new palace had three wings and a central tower which form an "E" shape when seen from above. Later this was interpreted as referring to the name of the Duke's second wife, Elisabeth Eleonore of Brunswick-Wolfenbüttel, thus giving the palace its current name.

The building was remodelled in the 19th century, and a dry moat added. The heavily rustic window surrounds, which now dominate the facade were added in 1845. Originally the windows had simple rectangular shaped frames made of sandstone. In 1918 a new Italian marble fountain was added. The interior decorations represent a gamut of architectural styles beginning with the Baroque frescoes commissioned by Bernard I through the Rococo and 19th century Empire styles.

The palace and its court orchestra have been associated with many famous musicians, and particularly with Hans von Bülow, Max Reger, and Johannes Brahms, who was a frequent guest there. The music archives hold a large collection of autograph scores, including many of Bach's, as well as a collection of historical instruments. The palace also has a very large court library, which was regularly used by Friedrich Schiller during his stay in the area.

== Burials in the Schlosskirche of the Holy Trinity ==
- Bernhard I, Duke of Saxe-Meiningen
- Marie Hedwig of Hesse-Darmstadt
- Elisabeth Eleonore of Brunswick-Wolfenbüttel
- Ernst Ludwig I, Duke of Saxe-Meiningen
- Dorothea Marie of Saxe-Gotha-Altenburg
- Margravine Elisabeth Sophie of Brandenburg (1674–1748)
- Ernst Ludwig II, Duke of Saxe-Meiningen
- Karl Friedrich, Duke of Saxe-Meiningen
- Friedrich Wilhelm, Duke of Saxe-Meiningen
- Anton Ulrich, Duke of Saxe-Meiningen

== See also ==
- List of music museums
