= Princess Luise Dorothea of Saxe-Meiningen =

Luise Dorothea
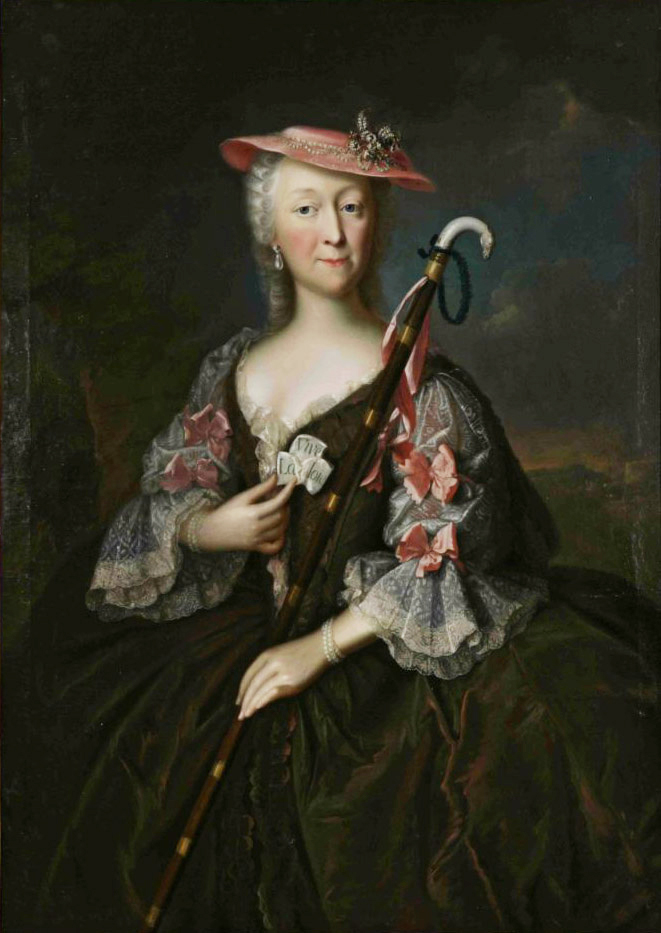

Duchess consort of Saxe-Gotha-Altenburg
- Tenure: 23 March 1732 – 22 October 1767
- Born: 10 August 1710; Coburg
- Died: 22 October 1767 (aged 57); Gotha
- Spouse: Frederick III, Duke of Saxe-Gotha-Altenburg (m. 1729)
- Issue: Frederick, Hereditary Prince of Saxe-Gotha-Altenburg; Prince Ludwig; Princess Fredericka Luise; Ernst II; Princess Sophie; Prince August
- House: Saxe-Meiningen
- Father: Ernest Louis I, Duke of Saxe-Meiningen
- Mother: Dorothea Marie of Saxe-Gotha-Altenburg

Luise Dorothea of Saxe-Meiningen (10 August 1710 – 22 October 1767) was a member of German royalty. She was born in Meiningen, the daughter of Ernst Ludwig I, Duke of Saxe-Meiningen and Dorothea Marie of Saxe-Gotha. She was Duchess of Saxe-Gotha-Altenburg as the wife of Frederick III, Duke of Saxe-Gotha-Altenburg.

== Marriage and issue ==
On 17 September 1729 in Meiningen, Luise married Frederick III, Duke of Saxe-Gotha-Altenburg, her first cousin. They had nine children:

1. Frederick Louis, Hereditary Prince of Saxe-Gotha-Altenburg (b. Gotha, 20 January 1735 – d. Gotha, 9 June 1756).
2. Louis (b. Gotha, 25 October 1735 – d. Gotha, 26 October 1735).
3. stillborn son (Gotha, 25 October 1735), twin of Louis.
4. stillborn twin sons (1739).
5. Fredericka Louise (b. Gotha, 30 January 1741 – d. Gotha, 5 February 1776).
6. Ernest II, Duke of Saxe-Gotha-Altenburg (b. Gotha, 30 January 1745 – d. Gotha, 20 April 1804).
7. Sophie (b. Gotha, 9 March 1746 – d. Gotha, 30 March 1746).
8. August (b. Gotha, 14 August 1747 – d. Gotha, 28 September 1806).

Luise died in Gotha, aged 57.

== Ancestry ==
Ancestors of Princess Luise Dorothea of Saxe-Meiningen

8. Ernest I, Duke of Saxe-Gotha
4. Bernhard I, Duke of Saxe-Meiningen
9. Princess Elisabeth Sophie of Saxe-Altenburg
2. Ernst Ludwig I, Duke of Saxe-Meiningen
10. George II, Landgrave of Hesse-Darmstadt
5. Marie Hedwig of Hesse-Darmstadt
11. Sophia Eleonore of Saxony
1. Luise Dorothea of Saxe-Meiningen
12. Ernest I, Duke of Saxe-Gotha (=8)
6. Frederick I, Duke of Saxe-Gotha-Altenburg
13. Princess Elisabeth Sophie of Saxe-Altenburg (=9)
3. Dorothea Marie of Saxe-Gotha
14. August, Duke of Saxe-Weissenfels
7. Magdalena Sibylle of Saxe-Weissenfels
15. Anna Maria of Mecklenburg-Schwerin

Princess Luise Dorothea of Saxe-Meiningen House of Saxe-Meiningen Cadet branch of the House of Wettin Born: 10 August 1710 Died: 22 October 1767
German royalty
Preceded by Magdalena Augusta of Anhalt-Zerbst	Duchess consort of Saxe-Gotha-Altenburg; 23 March 1732 – 22 October 1767	Vacant Title next held by Charlotte of Saxe-Meiningen
