= Gründerzeit Museum =

Museum in Berlin, Germany

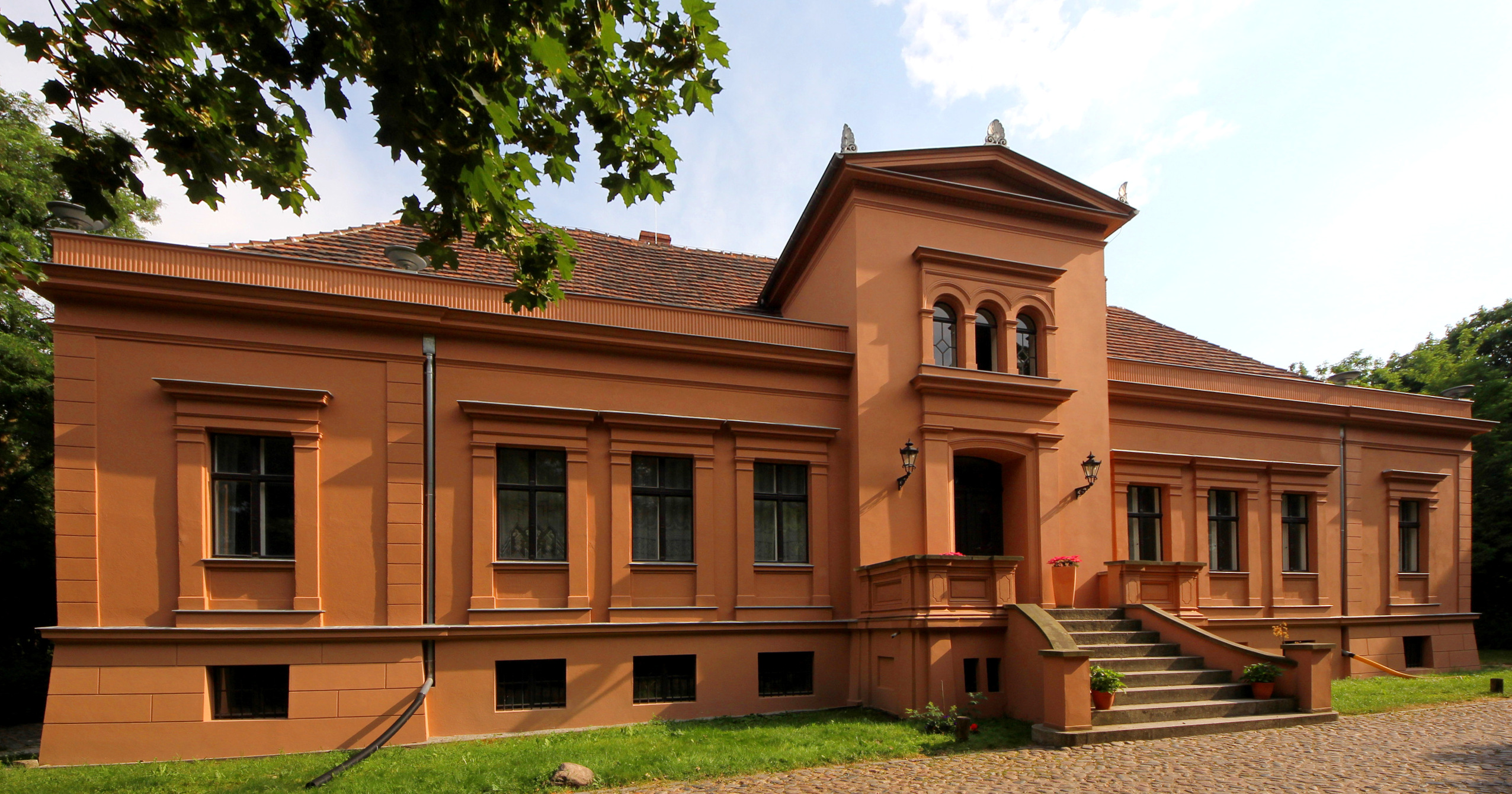
The Gutshaus Mahlsdorf

The Gründerzeit Museum at Gutshaus Mahlsdorf is a museum in Berlin, Germany. It is dedicated to the objects, home furnishings, and material culture of the German Gründerzeit period, which coincided with the middle and late 19th century. The collection is housed within the historic Gutshaus Mahlsdorf, or Mahlsdorf Manor House, in the Mahlsdorf district of Berlin. The Gründerzeit Museum is also known for its association with its founder, Charlotte von Mahlsdorf (1928-2002), who saved the manor house from demolition, restored it to its former appearance, and curated displays featuring her own private collection.

== History of the Museum ==
Charlotte von Mahlsdorf had been fascinated by 19th century furniture, antiques, and other goods since childhood. As a teenager during World War II, she was employed by a local secondhand dealer, and began to build her own collection.

Items on display in the Gründerzeit Museum

The Gutshaus Mahlsdorf was built in Mahlsdorf around 1815. Following the division of Berlin and Germany along the Iron Curtain, Mahlsdorf was a part of East Berlin. Charlotte von Mahlsdorf moved into the Gutshaus in 1958, and began the work of restoring and preserving the house, which had previously been slated for demolition. In 1960, von Mahlsdorf opened the house to the public as the Gründerzeit Museum.

In 1974, the East German government unsuccessfully attempted to seize control of the museum, and a defiant von Mahlsdorf began giving away items from the collection to museum visitors, as an act of Protest.

In 1991, following German reunification, a Pride festival held at the museum was attacked by a large group of Neo-Nazis. Convinced that she could not stay in Germany, Charlotte von Mahlsdorf chose immigration to Sweden, taking much of her collection with her. The museum reopened in 1997, through the efforts of the city of Berlin, and a volunteer association. Following von Mahlsdorf's death in 2002, much of her collection was returned to the Gründerzeit Museum.

== Collection ==
Exhibits in the Gründerzeit Museum in the Mahlsdorf Manor House

The collection of the Gründerzeit museum includes clocks, domestic and kitchen appliances, utensils, dishes, candlesticks, light fixtures, mirrors, musical instruments, gramophones, furniture, and other items that would have furnished a bourgeois home of the Gründerzeit period. Of particular note is the collection of "musical automata" including player pianos, music boxes, early jukeboxes, and other antique machines for making or reproducing music. At one point, the collection filled 23 rooms of the Gutshaus. The museum boasts both a grand ballroom, and an ornate garden park.

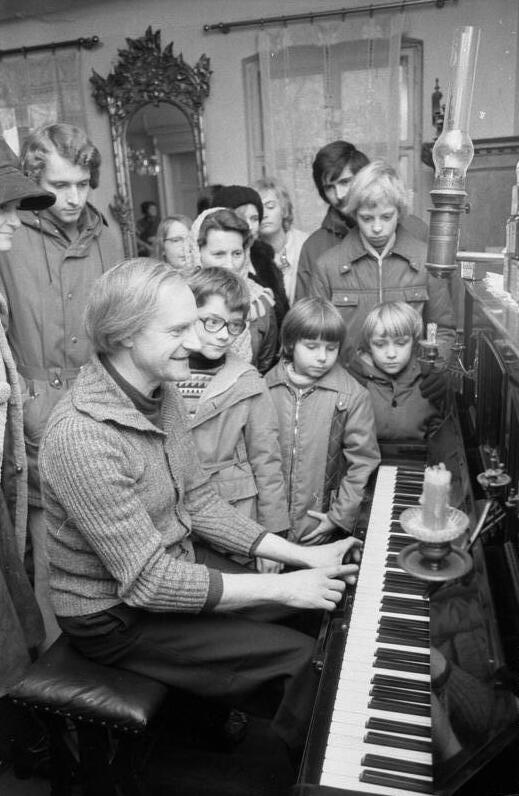
Charlotte von Mahlsdorf demonstrates an instrument for guests at the Gründerzeit Museum, 1977

Another unique feature of the museum is the Mulackritze, a traditional Berlin bar, with a front and back room. When the building housing the bar was condemned in 1963, Charlotte von Mahlsdorf ensured that its interiors were preserved, transported, and entirely recreated inside the Gutshaus Mahlsdorf. During the Cold War, the Mulackritze became a meeting spot for East Berlin's clandestine LGBTQ community.

Today, the museum is open to visitors who take a guided tour.

== Cultural significance ==
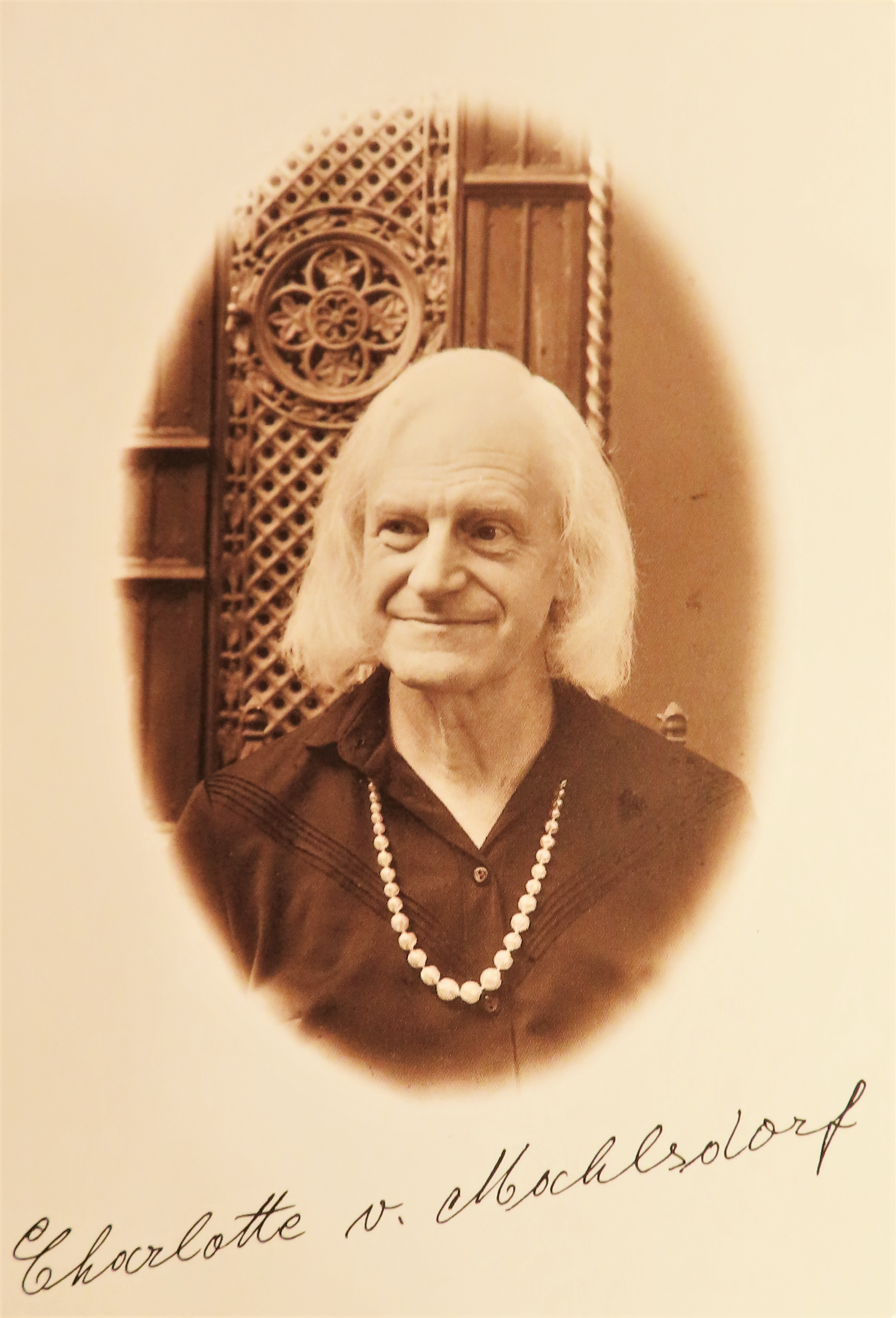
Charlotte von Mahlsdorf, founder and curator of the Gründerzeit Museum

Charlotte von Mahlsdorf remains a notable figure in the history of LGBTQ culture in Berlin, and the Gründerzeit Museum is depicted in numerous biographical works regarding her life, including the 1992 Rosa von Praunheim film I Am My Own Woman, and the Tony nominated play I Am My Own Wife (by Doug Wright), as well as von Mahlsdorf's own autobiography (also called I Am My Own Wife).
