= Ursula Sillge =

German sociologist and lesbian activist (born 1946)

- Born: 1946 (age 79–80); Untermaßfeld, Thuringia, East Germany
- Other name: Uschi Sillge
- Occupations: Farmer, sociologist, activist
- Years active: 1970s–present

Ursula Sillge (born 1946) is a German sociologist and LGBT activist. She organized the first national lesbian gathering in East Germany, and between 1970 and 1990 was one of the main lesbian activists in the country, pressing authorities to recognize the rights and allow visibility of the LGBT community. In 1986, she founded the Sunday Club in Berlin. It was the only secular association representing homosexuals in the 1980s, though it was not officially recognized. The organization became the first legal association to represent the LGBT community in East Germany when it was allowed to register in 1990. Sillge resigned as director of the Sunday Club in 1991 to found the LGBT archive known as the Lila Women's Archives. After the fall of the Berlin Wall, she was able to earn her doctorate. In addition to running the archives, she has published several works about homosexuality and women behind the Iron Curtain.

== Early life and education ==
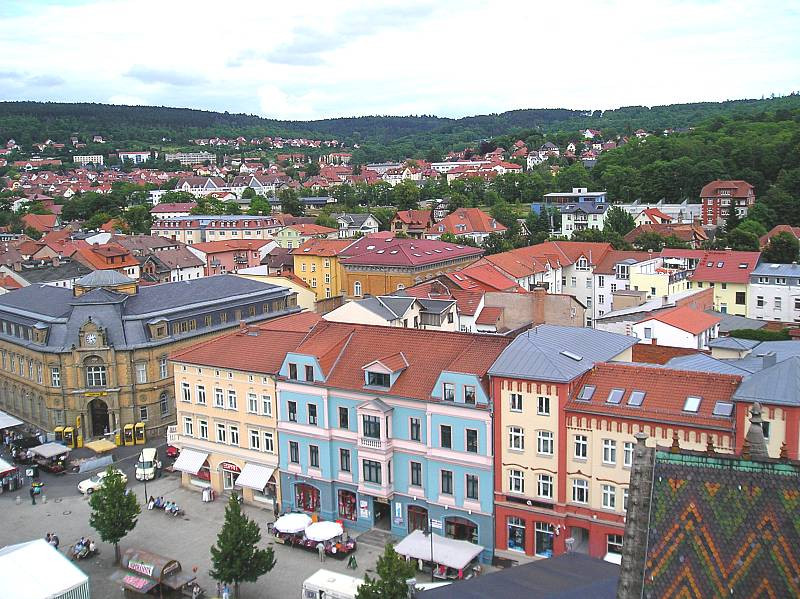
Meiningen

Ursula Sillge was born in 1946 in Untermaßfeld, a municipality in the state of Thuringia, which at the time was administered as part of the Soviet occupation zone (after October 1949 East Germany). She grew up in Meiningen, and was typically known as Uschi. Beginning in 1963, she trained in animal husbandry with a specialty in breeding cattle, earning her state certification in 1966. Sillge recognized that she was attracted to women around the age of 20, but had no way to determine if she was the only person who felt that way. She scheduled an appointment with a marriage counselor, who though shocked at her admission that she wanted a girlfriend, suggested that she advertise for pen pal. She took the advice and felt as if she had been given a lifeline, when three women answered. From 1968 through 1972, she attended Humboldt University of Berlin, earning a degree in agricultural engineering.

Between 1972 and 1977, Sillge worked as a research assistant at Humboldt University. During this time, the Homosexuelle Interessengemeinschaft Berlin (Homosexual Interest Group Berlin, HIB) formed in 1973 and began lobbying for gay and lesbian rights. As most of its members were males concerned with their own issues, in 1976 Christiane Seefeld attempted to set up a lesbian branch of the HIB. The lesbian branch did not materialize and when in the late 1970s Sillge began participating in HIB social events, she was often the only woman. Because the LGBT activists' groups were typically dominated by men and women's issues were dismissed, Sillge began leading a circle of lesbians who regularly met at the House of Health. The group disbanded when the physicians and psychologists who worked at the facility began making demands that in exchange for giving them space for meetings, the women should allow medical testing and analysis of themselves.

== Career ==
=== Efforts at organization (1978–1982) ===
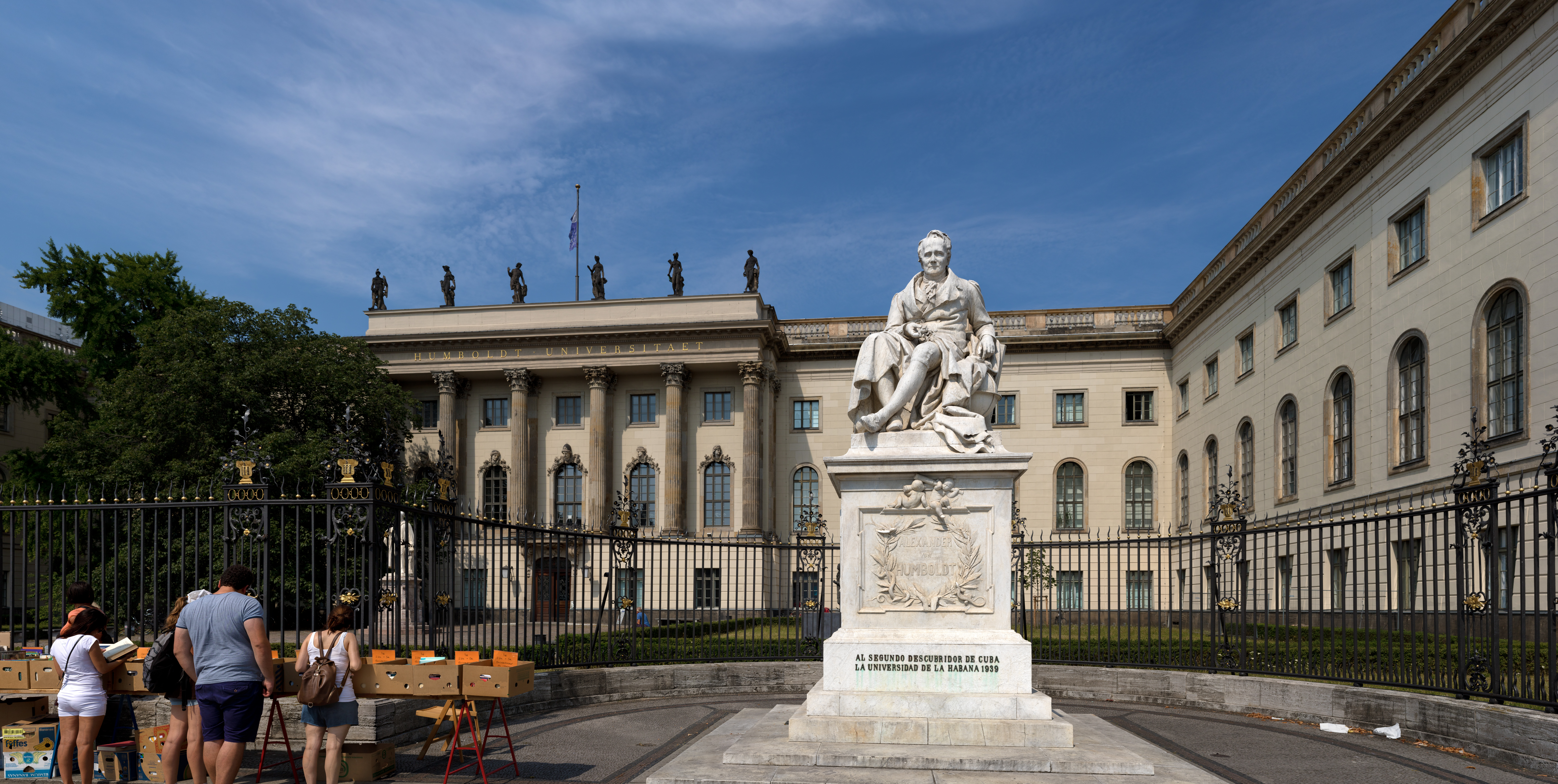
Humboldt University in Berlin

In 1978, Sillge who had begun working as a housing manager, organized the first national lesbian gathering which was to be held in the Gründerzeit Museum, a venue operated by Charlotte von Mahlsdorf, where HIB events often took place. After she sent out invitations, the police arrested and interrogated her, but decided to allow the event to proceed. Despite their assurances, on 8 April when the lesbians began arriving, the police refused to allow them to gather at the venue, forcing HIB to try to organize other events over the weekend. Sillge's apartment became the center of their activities for those who had traveled to participate. The police barred von Mahlsdorf from hosting any similar gatherings. Petitions to various authorities made it clear that there was no support for a social and educational center for homosexuals. The final decision by the Council of Ministers in September 1979 led HIB members to decide to dissolve the organization. The government position, according to scholar Geoffrey Giles, was that separate meeting spaces for the LGBT community were unnecessary because state social organizations allowed anyone to participate.

Sillge became a court clerk in 1979, but left the following year, when she began writing and publishing for the journal Task. Most LGBT groups after the demise of HIB began affiliating with church groups, holding awareness sessions. An agreement of 1978, between the government and individual Protestant churches, officially granted autonomy to churches in East Germany, including the authority to integrate marginalized groups into society by providing them with social services. From 1982, various churches welcomed alternative groups like LGBT, human rights, peace, and women's rights activists, offering them space to meet which was protected from state interference. The motivation of the various churches was to attract new members, but also to serve their own members by providing information on the focal topics of the groups. The Stasi, the state security service, planted undercover spies in the church focus groups to gather information and create discord between the groups and the church.

=== Establishing the Sunday Club (1983–1989) ===
Sillge participated in the church groups, but wanted to be independent from religious ties. In 1983, she began a sociology course, enrolling through a distance learning program at Karl Marx University, Leipzig, but was not allowed to complete her degree at either Humboldt or Karl Marx Universities because of a Stasi directive. When told by officials that for the government to sanction LGBT meetings, scientific studies would be needed, Sillge made arrangements with the social sciences department of Humboldt University to establish a research group on homosexuality in 1984. This group produced On the Situation of Homophile Citizens in the GDR in 1985, which showed high rates of suicide and discrimination against gays. It argued that failing to address their issues was a direct cause of many of them requesting to leave the country. It also suggested that counseling and educational services should be provided and that discriminatory laws about relationships and housing should be examined.

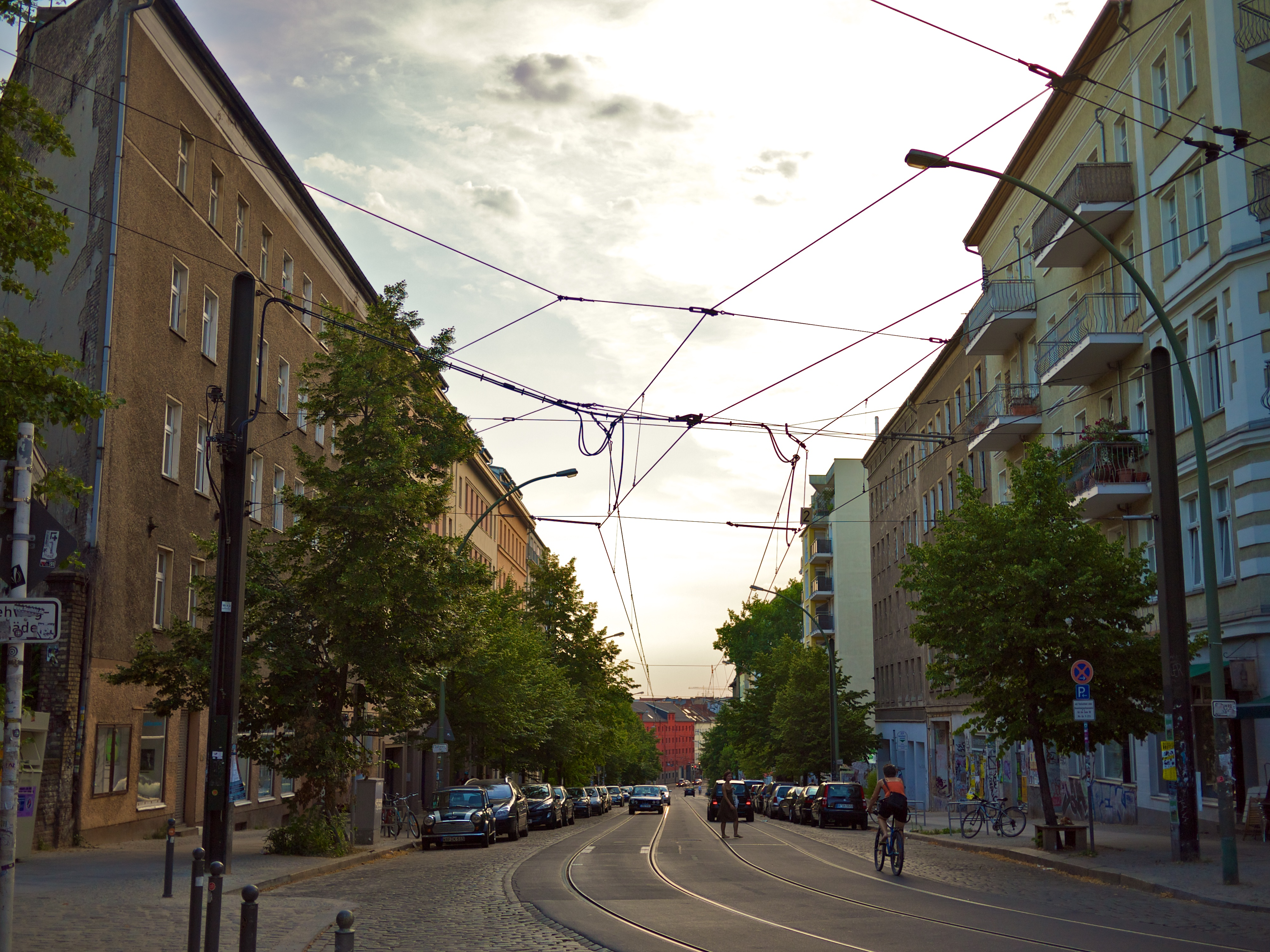
Veteranenstraße in Berlin

In 1986, Sillge got permission to hold social events on Sundays at the Mittzwanziger-Klub on Veteranenstraße, because the venue had no other tenant on that day. After the first year, the organization lost the space because of a renovation project and did not have a permanent meeting place until 1988, when their gatherings began to be held at the Kreiskulturhaus (District Cultural Center) in the Mitte district of Berlin. The events became known as the Sunday Club by 1987. It was the only secular organization for the LGBT community in East Germany, and Sillge served as its director until 1991.

The Sunday Club was open to both men and women and consciously aimed to integrate homosexuals into the socialist society, pressing for both their visibility and rights. Sillge's contention was that by integrating homosexuals, the government would lessen the strength of the churches and would gain support from a large community of people who had traditionally been excluded. As director, Sillge pressured government officials from the Politburo to the army and from the Socialist Unity Party of Germany to the city council to allow the LGBT community to legally meet and organize. She cultivated ties with activists in the west by speaking at universities in Cologne and Münster, hoping to secure educational materials for club members. Sillge also petitioned authorities to allow scholarly sexology reports to be brought in for members to use for research and to allow gay men and women to post companionship advertisements. Her efforts resulted in a large library of material on homosexuality becoming available in East Germany, which she shared with people in the community. In addition, she mailed circulars about the group's events and kept a wide correspondence to help members find solutions for personal problems.

These activities made Sillge a target of the Stasi, which routinely kept lists of personal ads in newspapers and magazines posted by homosexuals. Their dossier on her noted that since 1983, she had demanded that state authorities recognize the rights of homosexuals, but was not a party member and had no full-time employment. Sillge acknowledged to writer Liesa Hellman that she was unemployed in the period and learned after reading the Stasi's file on her after unification that it was because they had spread a rumor that she was an operative.

By the end of the 1980s the government reversed its position on the political demands of the LGBT community, reasoning that if the state allowed them to organize and addressed their issues, the need for the church alliances would cease. Among changes were striking the section of the penal code that specified different ages of consent for heterosexual and homosexual relations, allowing gay chapters to organize in the Free German Youth, and unofficially recognizing the Sunday Club as an LGBT lobbying organization. Sillge and her partner were able to live together and co-parent Sillge's daughter. Despite changes in the government's stance, the Stasi continued to surveil LGBT community members, particularly Sillge as she was deemed to be hostile and in opposition to the state.

=== After reunification (1990–present) ===
The Sunday Club (sonntags|club), 28 Greifenhagener Straße in Berlin-Prenzlauer Berg

Despite the desire of many East Germans for reunification, Sillge was skeptical because if the West German constitution was adopted, it would mean a loss of rights for the LGBT community. At the time, the West German constitution prohibited abortion and retained language making the age of consent different for homosexual and heterosexual relationships. The Sunday Club finally gained official status as an association in 1990, after the fall of the Berlin Wall. In 1991, in Berlin, Sillge founded the Lila Women's Archive, which aims to collect documents related to lesbians and women's rights activists.

Her book, Un-Sichtbare Frauen: Lesben und ihre Emanzipation in der DDR (Invisible Women: Lesbians and Their Emancipation in the GDR), the first publication from the inside to address lesbianism in East Germany, was released that year. It is considered by historian David Brandon Dennis to be one of the major works written by insiders about the LGBT movement in East Germany. She and her partner operated a hostel to cover their expenses and those of the archive. The following year, she earned her PhD in philosophy at Humboldt University. In 1993, she became the chair of the Women's advisory board for the Berlin-Prenzlauer Berg and in 1994 ran as a Bundestag candidate for the district. Though their hostel operated in Berlin for many years, in 2010, Sillge and her life partner relocated to Thuringia. She and Ingeborg Buck operate the archives there from a former boarding school. She has published several articles and books about homosexuality and women behind the Iron Curtain.

== Legacy ==
The Sunday Club relocated in 1999 to 28 Greifenhagener Straße in Berlin-Prenzlauer Berg and continues to provide counseling referral and educational services to the LGBT community. In 2008, a documentary film Das Burlebübele mag i net (I Don't Like the Bumpkin) was produced for a video seminar "Parallel Biographies East/West" in the Department of Cultural Studies at the Humboldt University by Anke Schwarz, Sandra "Luka" Stoll and Roman Klarfeld. The film compared the life journeys of two lesbian activists — Sillge from East Berlin and Cristina Perincioli from West Berlin — during the 1970s and 1980s. (Note: In the lyrics of the similarly titled East German children's Folksong, "Es Burlebübele mag i net" (Swiss version "Es Burebüebli mah-n-i-nit") the singer rejects the country bumpkin, the son of the gentleman, and any imperfect rascal who makes mistakes, preferring to stay single until death.) Samuel Clowes Huneke, who wrote a book in 2022 contrasting the experiences of the LGBT community in East and West Germany, called Sillge "one of the main queer activists in East Germany in the 1970s and 1980s".

== Selected works ==
- Sillge, Ursula (1991). Un-Sichtbare Frauen: Lesben und ihre Emanzipation in der DDR [Invisible Women: Lesbians and Their Emancipation in the GDR] (in German) (1. Auflage ed.). Berlin: LinksDruck Verlags. ISBN 978-3-86153-012-1.
- Sillge, Ursula (1991). "'Wenn du kein Kind hättest, würde ich denken, du bist eine Lesbe!' Zur Situation lesbischer Frauen in der DDR vor und nach der "Wende" ['If You Didn't Have a Child, I Would Think You Were a Lesbian!': On the Situation of Lesbian Women in the GDR before and after Reunification]". In Streib, Uli (ed.). Von nun an nannten sie sich Mütter: Lesben und Kinder [From Now on They Called Each Other Mothers: Lesbians and Children] (in German) (1. Auflage ed.). Berlin: Orlanda Frauenverlag. pp. 135–146. ISBN 978-3-922166-73-3.
- Sillge, Ursula; Arnold, Monika (1996). Miss Marples Schwestern: historische Spurensuche nach Frauen vor Ort [Miss Marple's Sisters: Finding Historical Traces of Local Women] (in German) (2., erw. Aufl ed.). Hamburg, Germany: Hamburg Frauengeschichtsgruppe im Stadtteilarchiv Ottensen. ISBN 978-3-931823-00-9.
- Sillge, Ursula (2007). Namhafte Brandenburgerinnen [Brandenburg Independent Women's Association] (in German). Berlin: Unabhängiger Frauenverband Brandenburg. OCLC 837670398.
- Sillge, Ursula (2008). "Damals war's! Zu Bedingungen, Strukturen und Definitionen der lesbisch-schwulen Bewegung in der DDR: Ein Rückblick aus der Distanz von 15 Jahren" [So It Was! On the Conditions, Structures and Definitions of the Lesbian and Gay Movement in the GDR: A Review from a Distance of 15 Years]. In Heinrich Böll Foundation (ed.). Lesben und Schwule in der DDR: Tagungsdokumentation. Lesben- und Schwulenverband in Deutschland (LSVD), Landesverband Sachsen-Anhalt e.V., Heinrich-Böll-Stiftung Sachsen-Anhalt 22–23 Oct. 2005, Magdeburg, Germany (in German). Halle (Saale), Germany: Heinrich Böll Stiftung Sachsen-Anhalt e.V. pp. 109–. ISBN 978-3-941061-00-2.

== See also ==
- LGBTQ rights in the German Democratic Republic
