= Karl Friedrich, Duke of Saxe-Meiningen =

Karl Friedrich
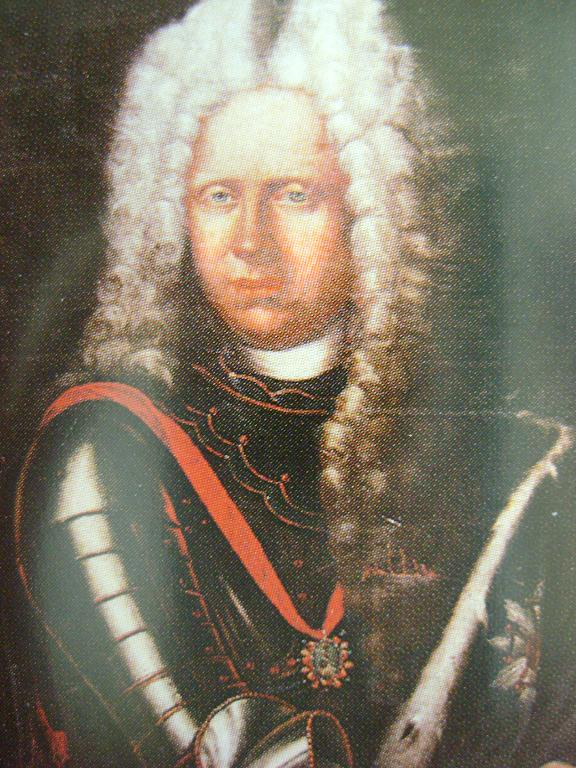
- Portrait, c. 1725–1743

Duke of Saxe-Meiningen
- Reign: 24 February 1729 – 28 March 1743
- Predecessor: Ernst Ludwig II
- Successor: Friedrich Wilhelm
- Born: 18 July 1712; Meiningen
- Died: 28 March 1743 (aged 30); Meiningen
- House: Saxe-Meiningen
- Father: Ernst Ludwig I, Duke of Saxe-Meiningen
- Mother: Dorothea Marie of Saxe-Gotha
- Religion: Lutheranism

Karl Friedrich, Duke of Saxe-Meiningen (Meiningen, 18 July 1712 – Meiningen, 28 March 1743), was a duke of Saxe-Meiningen.

He was the fourth but third surviving son of Ernst Ludwig I, Duke of Saxe-Meiningen and his first wife, Dorothea Marie of Saxe-Gotha-Altenburg.

Karl Friedrich inherited the duchy of Saxe-Meiningen when his father died in 1724, along with his older brother, Ernst Ludwig II, under the guardianship of his uncles Frederick Wilhelm and Anton Ulrich until 1733.

When his older brother died unmarried in 1729, Karl Frederick ruled alone until his death.

Like his brother, he never married, and, after his death, was succeeded by his uncle, Friedrich Wilhelm.

== Ancestry ==
Ancestors of Karl Friedrich, Duke of Saxe-Meiningen

8. Ernest I, Duke of Saxe-Gotha
4. Bernhard I, Duke of Saxe-Meiningen
9. Princess Elisabeth Sophie of Saxe-Altenburg
2. Ernst Ludwig I, Duke of Saxe-Meiningen
10. George II, Landgrave of Hesse-Darmstadt
5. Marie Hedwig of Hesse-Darmstadt
11. Sophia Eleonore of Saxony
1. Karl Friedrich, Duke of Saxe-Meiningen
12. Ernest I, Duke of Saxe-Gotha (=8)
6. Frederick I, Duke of Saxe-Gotha-Altenburg
13. Princess Elisabeth Sophie of Saxe-Altenburg (=9)
3. Dorothea Marie of Saxe-Gotha-Altenburg
14. August, Duke of Saxe-Weissenfels
7. Magdalena Sibylle of Saxe-Weissenfels
15. Anna Maria of Mecklenburg-Schwerin

Karl Friedrich, Duke of Saxe-Meiningen House of Saxe-Meiningen Cadet branch of the House of Wettin Born: 18 July 1712 Died: 28 March 1743
Regnal titles
Preceded by Ernst Ludwig II	Duke of Saxe-Meiningen; 1729–1743	Succeeded by Friedrich Wilhelm
