= Elisabeth Eleonore of Brunswick-Wolfenbüttel =

Duchess consort of Saxe-Meiningen (1658–1729)

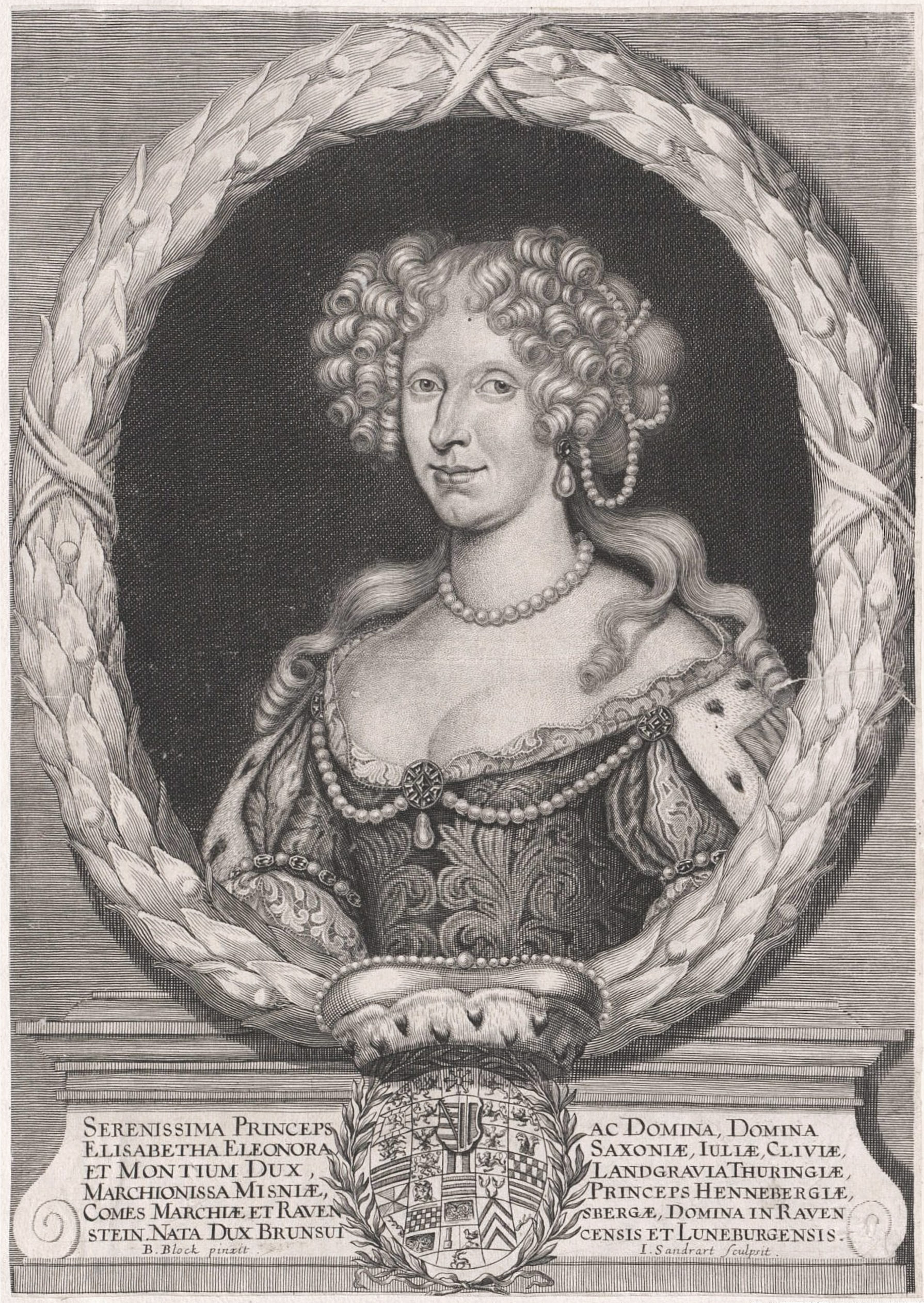

Duchess consort of Saxe-Meiningen
- Tenure: 25 January 1681 – 27 April 1706
- Born: 30 September 1658; Wolfenbüttel
- Died: 15 March 1729 (aged 70); Meiningen
- Spouse: John George of Mecklenburg-Schwerin (m. 1675; died 1675) Bernhard I, Duke of Saxe-Meiningen (m. 1681; died 1706)
- Issue: Anton Ulrich, Duke of Saxe-Meiningen
- House: Welf
- Father: Anthony Ulrich, Duke of Brunswick-Wolfenbüttel
- Mother: Elisabeth Juliane of Schleswig-Holstein-Sonderburg-Norburg

Elisabeth Eleonore of Brunswick-Wolfenbüttel (30 September 1658 – 15 March 1729) was the eldest daughter of Duke Anthony Ulrich of Brunswick-Wolfenbüttel and Elisabeth Juliane of Schleswig-Holstein-Sonderburg-Norburg.

== Life ==
Elisabeth Eleonore married twice. On 2 February 1675 in Wolfenbüttel, she married Prince Johann Georg of Mecklenburg-Schwerin (1629-1675), son of Adolphus Frederick I, Duke of Mecklenburg-Schwerin and Anna Maria of Ostfriesland, but he died accidentally poisoned five months later. On 25 January 1681 in Schöningen, she married Duke Bernard I of Saxe-Meiningen, son of Ernest I, Duke of Saxe-Gotha and his wife, Princess Elisabeth Sophie of Saxe-Altenburg. This was described as a happy marriage, although she did not share his interest in alchemy and in the military. Elisabeth Eleonore was very musical and her father was an author. She noticeably stimulated her husband's interest in music and literature.

After her husband's death, she sided with her stepson Ernest Louis I and his minister von Wolzogen, in his quest for sole rulership, ignoring the wish in Bernard I's testament that his sons share power. This led to 30 years of fraternal strife, during which Elisabeth Eleanor supported her stepson Ernest Louis, against her own son Anton Ulrich. Anton Ulrich had married morganatically to Philippine Elisabeth Cäsar, who was not of noble descent; Elisabeth Eleonore behaved very coolly towards her.

During Ernest Louis I's rule, Meiningen developed into a centre of musical culture; this is largely due to Elisabeth Eleonore. The family strife caused her to retreat from public life and concern herself more with religion. She wrote several hymns.

== Legacy ==
Elisabethenburg Palace in Meiningen was named after her.

== Issue ==
From her marriage to Bernhard I, she had five children:

1. Elisabeth Ernestine (3 December 1681 in Meiningen – 24 December 1766 in Gandersheim), Abbess of Gandersheim Abbey (1713–1766).
2. Eleonore Frederika (2 March 1683 in Meiningen – 13 May 1739 in Meiningen), a nun at Gandersheim.
3. Anton August (20 June 1684 in Meiningen – 7 December 1684 in Meiningen).
4. Wilhelmine Luise (19 January 1686 in Meiningen – 5 October 1753 in Bernstadt), married on 20 December 1703 to Charles, Duke of Württemberg-Bernstadt.
5. Anton Ulrich, Duke of Saxe-Meiningen (22 October 1687 in Meiningen – 27 January 1763 in Frankfurt).
