= Charlotte von Mahlsdorf =

German transgender woman (1928–2002)

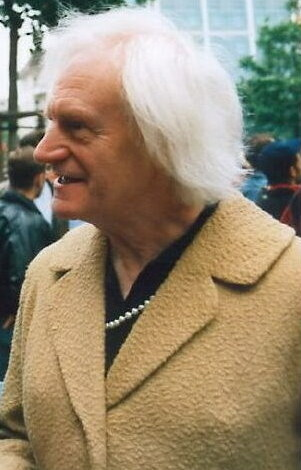
- Berlin Gay Pride Parade, 1994
- Born: 18 March 1928; Berlin-Mahlsdorf, Germany
- Died: 30 April 2002 (aged 74); Berlin, Germany

Charlotte von Mahlsdorf (18 March 1928 – 30 April 2002) was a well-known transgender woman in East Germany and founded the Gründerzeit Museum in Berlin-Mahlsdorf. Later she became a LGBT-icon in Germany because of Rosa von Praunheim's biopic I Am My Own Woman (1992).

When a local mansion was due for demolition, von Mahlsdorf was allowed to live there, and its contents became the basis for her collection of everyday household items from the Gründerzeit period (c. 1870s). The museum became a popular meeting-point for East Berlin’s gay community, to the disapproval of the East German regime (Stasi).

== Early years ==
Von Mahlsdorf was born to parents Max Berfelde and Gretchen Gaupp in Berlin-Mahlsdorf, Germany. At a very young age she began to play with gender roles and expressed more interest in the clothing and articles for girls. She helped a second-hand goods dealer clear out the apartments of deported Jews and sometimes kept items.

== Career ==
Von Mahlsdorf's collection evolved into the Gründerzeit Museum. She had become engaged in the preservation of the Gutshaus Mahlsdorf estate, which was threatened with demolition, and was awarded the manor house rent-free. In 1960, Von Mahlsdorf opened the museum of everyday articles from the Gründerzeit (the time of the founding of the German Empire) in the only partially-reconstructed Mahlsdorf manor house. The museum became well known in cinematic, artistic and gay circles. From 1970 on, the East Berlin homosexual scene often had meetings and celebrations in the museum.

In 1974 the East German authorities announced that they wanted to bring the museum and its exhibits under state control. In protest, von Mahlsdorf began giving away the exhibits to visitors. Thanks to the committed involvement of the actress Annekathrin Bürger and the attorney Friedrich Karl Kaul—and possibly also thanks to her enlistment as an inoffizieller Mitarbeiter (an unofficial collaborator) for Stasi, the secret East German police—the authorities' attempt was stopped in 1976 and she was able to keep the museum.

In 1991, neo-Nazis attacked one of her celebrations in the museum. Several participants were hurt. At this time, von Mahlsdorf announced she was considering leaving Germany.

In 1992, she received the Order of Merit of the Federal Republic of Germany (Bundesverdienstkreuz).

Her decision to leave Germany meant that she guided her last visitor through the museum in 1995, and in 1997 she moved to Porla Brunn, an old spa near Hasselfors, Sweden, where she opened (with moderate success) a new museum dedicated to the turn of the 19th century. The city of Berlin bought the Gründerzeit Museum, and by 1997 it had been opened again by the "Förderverein Gutshaus Mahlsdorf e. V.".

Her life could be described as that of an outsider who survived, no matter the ruling ideology, during the Nazi period, Communist-controlled East Germany, or, once the wall fell, modern Germany, as described in the article "The Sexual and Political Chameleon of Berlin: The Ambiguities of Charlotte von Mahlsdorf's Life in I Am My Own Wife.”

Von Mahlsdorf died from heart failure during a visit to Berlin on 30 April 2002.

== Legacy ==
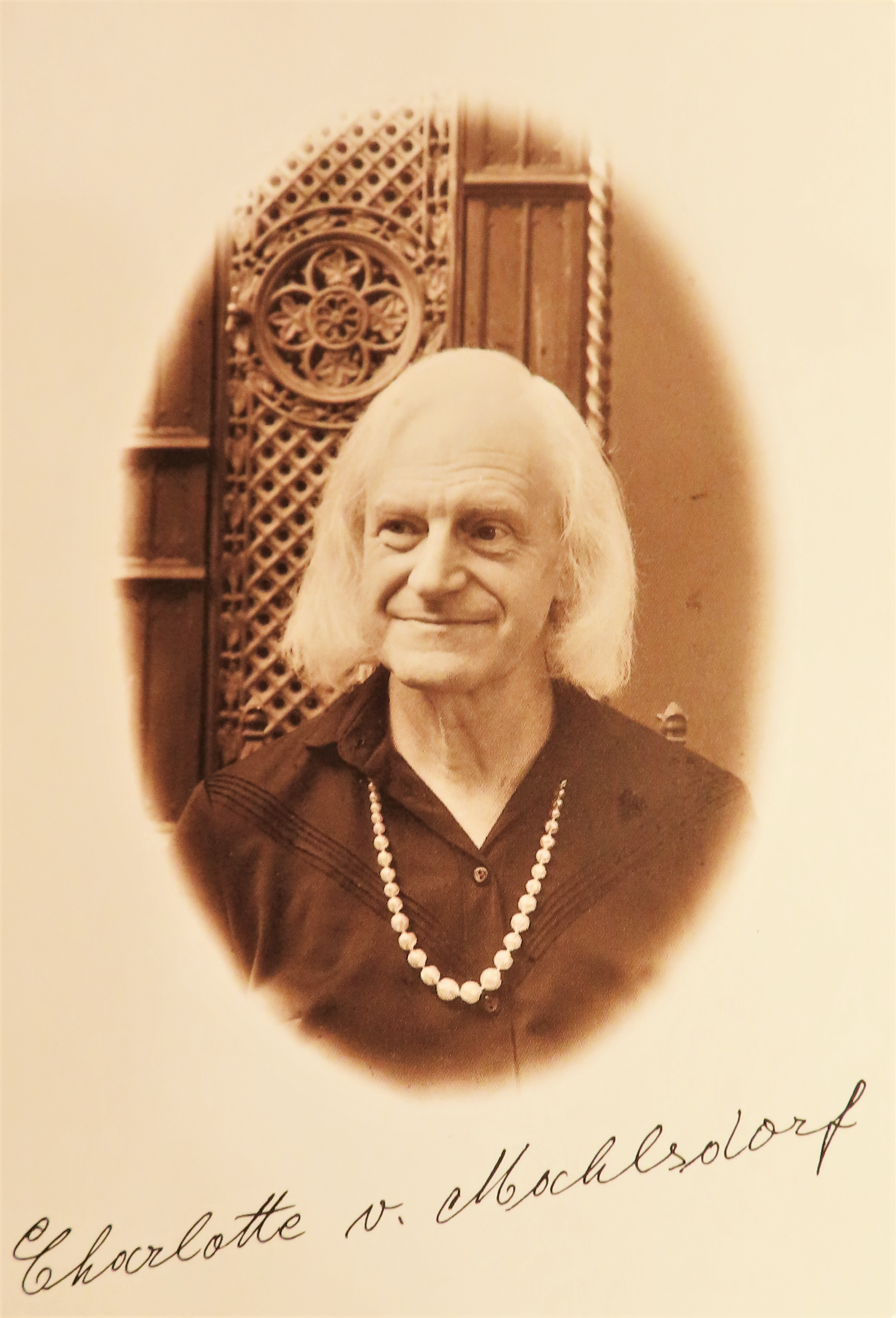
Charlotte von Mahlsdorf Autogramm

People still honour her memory, be it for her work as the founder of the Gründerzeit Museum, or for her public role as a transgender woman and her foregrounding of the persecution of homosexuals in both the Third Reich and East Germany. The appeal for a memorial to von Mahlsdorf, organized by the "Förderverein Gutshaus Mahlsdorf e. V." and the "Interessengemeinschaft Historische Friedhöfe Berlin" (Alliance of Historical Cemeteries in Berlin) was therefore a success.

The intention of the organizers was to erect a memorial with the inscription "Ich bin meine eigene Frau (I am my own woman) – Charlotte von Mahlsdorf – 18. März 1928 – 30. April 2002" on the first anniversary of Charlotte's death. Although Charlotte von Mahlsdorf had been known almost exclusively by her "stage name" in recent years, her relatives pushed through the inscription "Lothar Berfelde, 1928 – 2002, genannt Charlotte von Mahlsdorf. Dem Museumsgründer zur Erinnerung" (Lothar Berfelde, 1928 – 2002, known as Charlotte von Mahlsdorf. In memory of the [male] founder of the museum).

=== Documentary film ===
In 1992, German filmmaker Rosa von Praunheim made a film about von Mahlsdorf called I Am My Own Woman (Original title: Ich bin meine eigene Frau) with von Mahlsdorf appearing in the film.

=== Film ===
- Coming Out dir. Heiner Carow, 1989. Cameo role as barmaid.
- Charlotte in Schweden by filmmaker Rosa von Praunheim. In 2002, von Praunheim made a film about Charlotte's new life in Porla Brunn, Sweden.
- Charlotte by John Edward Heys, 2009. Screened at the 56th Internationale Kurzfilmtage Oberhausen, 2010.

=== Theatre plays ===
American playwright Doug Wright wrote the character play I Am My Own Wife based on von Mahlsdorf's life, based on interviews, personal correspondence, and biographical research. Since its initial run on- and off-Broadway in 2003, the play has garnered many major American theatre awards, including the Pulitzer Prize for Drama, Tony Award, the Drama Desk Award, Drama League Award, the Lucille Lortel Award, and the Lambda Literary Award for Drama.

German author Peter Süß, co-author and publisher of von Mahlsdorf's book, has made another play called Ich bin meine eigene Frau. The play had its premiere in spring 2006 at the Schauspiel Leipzig.

Larry Moss and Josef Ludwig Pfitzer made an adaptation of the Doug Wright play called Ich mach ja doch, was ich will (I still do what I want), that was shown at Teamtheater in May 2012 in Munich, Germany.

== Bibliography ==
- Mahlsdorf, Charlotte von (1992). Süß, Peter (ed.). Ich bin meine eigene Frau (in German) (1st ed.). Berlin: Edition Diá. ISBN 3-86034-109-X.
  - Mahlsdorf, Charlotte von; Hollander, Jean (translation) (1995). I Am My Own Woman: The Outlaw Life of Charlotte Von Mahlsdorf, Berlin's Most Distinguished Transvestite (translated 1st ed.). San Francisco: Cleis Press. ISBN 1573440108.
  - Mahlsdorf, Charlotte von; Hollander, Jean (translation) (2004). I Am My Own Wife: The True Story of Charlotte von Mahlsdorf (new ed.). San Francisco: Cleis Press. ISBN 1573442003.
- Mahlsdorf, Charlotte von (1997). Ab durch die Mitte (in German) (1st ed.). Munich: Deutscher Taschenbuch-Verlag (DTV). ISBN 3-423-20041-3.

== See also ==
- LGBTQ rights in the German Democratic Republic
