= Ernst Ludwig II =

Duke of Saxe-Meiningen from 1724 to 1729

Ernest Louis II
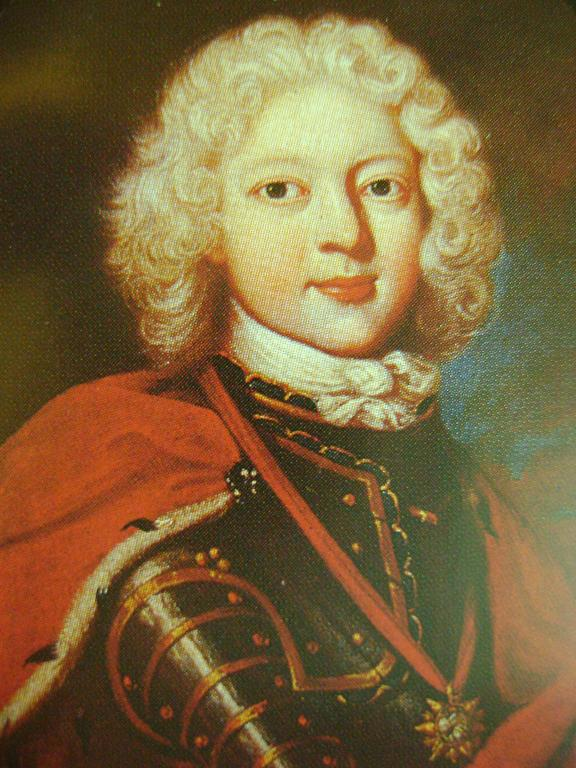
- Portrait, 1720s

Duke of Saxe-Meiningen
- Reign: 24 November 1724 - 24 February 1729
- Predecessor: Ernest Louis I
- Successor: Charles Frederick
- Born: 8 August 1709; Coburg
- Died: 24 February 1729 (aged 19); Meiningen
- House: Saxe-Meiningen
- Father: Ernest Louis I, Duke of Saxe-Meiningen
- Mother: Dorothea Marie of Saxe-Gotha
- Religion: Lutheranism

Ernst Ludwig II (Coburg, 8 August 1709 – Meiningen, 24 February 1729) was a duke of Saxe-Meiningen.

== Life ==
He was the third but second surviving son of Ernst Ludwig I, Duke of Saxe-Meiningen and his first wife, Dorothea Marie of Saxe-Gotha.

The death of his older brother Josef Bernhard (22 March 1724) made him the heir to the duchy of Saxe-Meiningen. When his father died seven months later (24 November 1724), Ernst Ludwig -15 years old- inherited the duchy along with his younger brother Karl Frederick.

Because the two princes were under age when their father died, their uncles Frederik Wilhelm and Anton Ulrich served as their guardians until 1733.

== Death ==
Ernst Ludwig died after reigning five years, only 19 years old and unmarried. He was succeeded by his younger brother, Karl Frederick.

== Ancestry ==
Ancestors of Ernst Ludwig II

8. Ernest I, Duke of Saxe-Gotha
4. Bernhard I, Duke of Saxe-Meiningen
9. Princess Elisabeth Sophie of Saxe-Altenburg
2. Ernst Ludwig I, Duke of Saxe-Meiningen
10. George II, Landgrave of Hesse-Darmstadt
5. Marie Hedwig of Hesse-Darmstadt
11. Sophia Eleonore of Saxony
1. Ernst Ludwig II, Duke of Saxe-Meiningen
12. Ernest I, Duke of Saxe-Gotha (=8)
6. Frederick I, Duke of Saxe-Gotha-Altenburg
13. Princess Elisabeth Sophie of Saxe-Altenburg (=9)
3. Dorothea Marie of Saxe-Gotha
14. August, Duke of Saxe-Weissenfels
7. Magdalena Sibylle of Saxe-Weissenfels
15. Anna Maria of Mecklenburg-Schwerin

Ernst Ludwig II House of Saxe-Meiningen Cadet branch of the House of Wettin Born: 8 August 1709 Died: 24 February 1729
Regnal titles
Preceded by Ernst Ludwig I	Duke of Saxe-Meiningen; 1724–1729	Succeeded by Karl Frederick
