= Sonntags-Club =

Group of lesbians, gays and bisexuals in the GDR

- Predecessor: Homosexuelle Interessengemeinschaft Berlin (HIB)
- Formation: 1986
- Founder: Ursula Sillge
- Purpose: Counseling, consciousness-raising, community-building and educational services for LGBTQ+ identifying persons and allies
- Headquarters: Geinfehegener Straße 28, Berlin, Germany
- Website: www.sonntags-club.de

The Sonntags-Club ('Sunday Club'), founded in 1987, was the first secular LGBT group in East Germany. The group originated out of the HIB (Homosexuelle Interessengemeinschaft Berlin) which was banned in the late 1970s by the socialist regime. The group became the Sonntags-Club in the 1980s when it went underground and began renting a meeting space only available on Sundays, hence the name. The club was located in East Berlin, and though never officially recognized in the German Democratic Republic, its members continued to advocate for LGBT rights and freedoms in the years to follow.

After the reunification of Germany, the Sonntags-Club was able to petition successfully for official status in 1990, and continues operation into the present day.

== History ==
The Sunday Club (sonntags|club), 28 Greifenhagener Straße in Berlin-Prenzlauer Berg.

=== 1970s ===
Since the partition of Germany at the end of World War II, the German Democratic Republic (GDR) restricted public debate on the topic of homosexuality, stalling advocacy on the topic. Stemming from previously held notions, homosexuality was considered a pathological condition and was criminalized. The lack of discourse around the topic in East Germany soon led to the first known private gay and lesbian groups of the 1970s. Considered the precursor to the Sonntags-Club, the HIB was one such group.

HIB, the group from which the Sonntags-Club emerged, was founded in the 1970s after the premiere of an underground LGBT film titled "Nicht der Homosexuelle ist pervers, sondern die Situation, in der er lebt" (It Is Not the Homosexual Who Is Perverse, But the Society in Which He Lives). It was the first group of its kind in the Eastern Bloc countries. The HIB had ties to multiple smaller LGBT groups across the Bloc, tying together queer individuals in the region. However, because of the GDR's refusal to grant official status to the organization, it was very difficult to find meeting space in an already difficult renting market (often space was only rented to official organizations). Consequently, most meetings were held in member's apartments or homes. This created precarious situations for its members because any permanent hosting of the group could result in police intervention. Still, the group continued to petition for official status from their first rejection in 1976 until its effective ban in 1979.

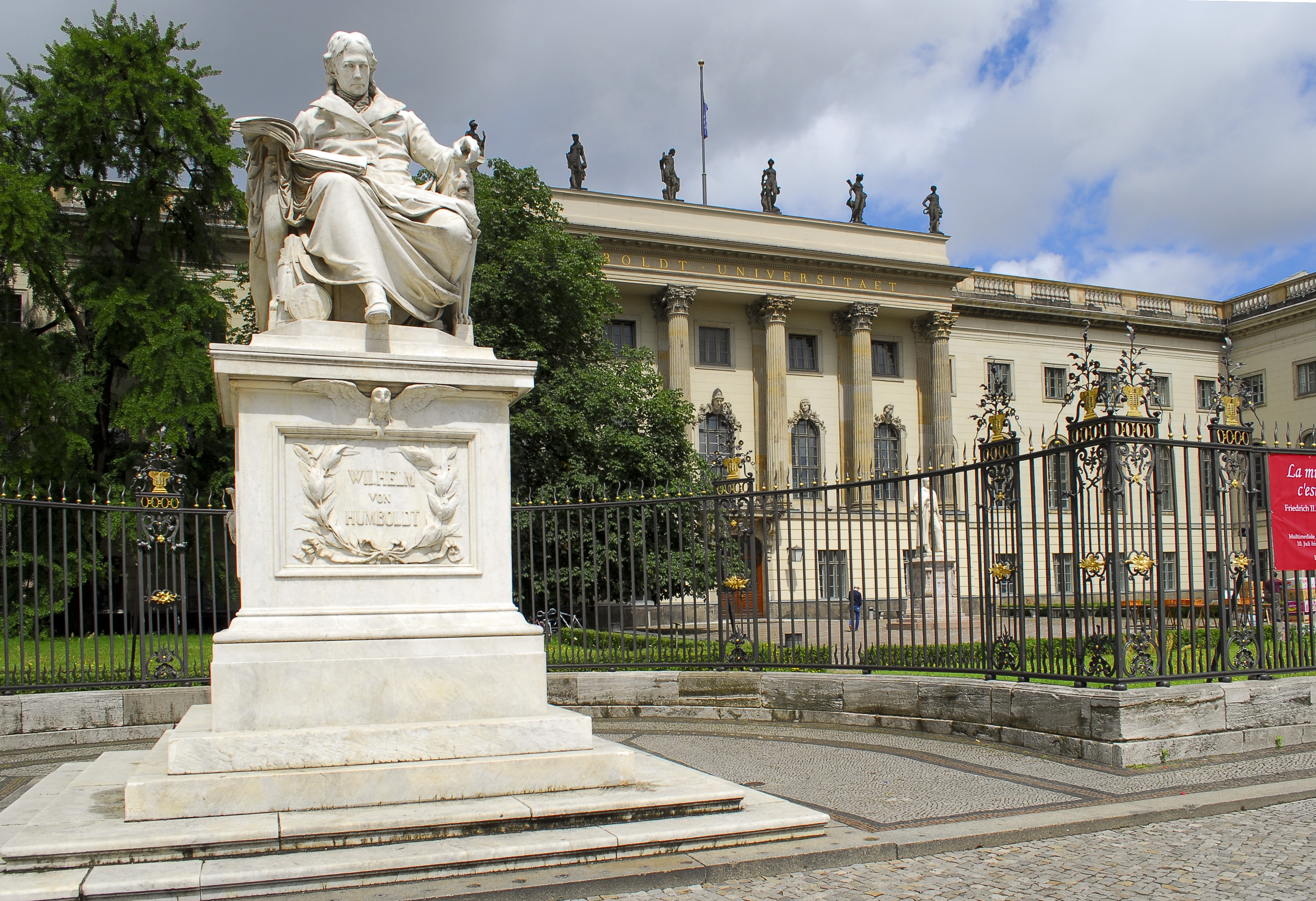
Humboldt University.

=== 1980s ===
After HIB's banning in 1979 one of its primary organizers Ursula Sillge broke off to establish her own LGBT group, the Sonntags-Club. In 1985, she organized the first events under the club's name – a youth event next to a small dance club in Berlin. In these early years of the group's formation, Sillge worked closely with Humboldt University to print materials. Despite these early informal events, the club was not officially formed until 1987. In this same year, the Sonntags-Club became affiliated with Haus der Kultur of Berlin-Mitte. Members from the HIB became involved with the new Sonntags-Club, including Peter Rausch, who led a discussion group on the topic of bisexuality.The organization was described as the "first independent lesbian group" and produced flyers for distribution. Though the group was originally created with lesbians in mind, it did grow to encompass more identities under the label of LGBTQ.

Along with the relaxing of social discourse on the topic of homosexuality, the 1980s saw more progressive state involvement with sexual minority groups. The state came to allow the establishment of gay and lesbian organizations within state and party institutions in the mid-80s, and the Sonntags-Club actively petitioned the city of Berlin for official recognition. In the late 1980s, the GDR government became more permissive to the discussion and recognition of sexual minorities within the socialist society. Even the Politburo suggested that government institutions openly support "homosexual integration" into society to curb illegal immigration from the state due to citizen concerns of human rights abuses. Despite this advice, no legal ratification came about before the fall of the Soviet Union and the subsequent dissolution of the GDR.

=== Post reunification ===
The months leading up to the reunification of Germany saw the first joint events between East and West LGBTQ German groups. West German activists were often surprised to find that East German groups were diverse, well organized, and populus.

The fall of the Berlin wall and the reunification stimulated concerns among East Germans that the gender and sexuality cultures they had cultivated separately from West Germany could be destroyed. These fears characterized the decade of the 1990s, especially considering the economic and political dominance of West German ways of being. The 90s were also tumultuous regarding the legality of homosexual acts. In the GDR, the infamous paragraph 175 had been overturned for a more moderate 151, but it was retained in the Federal Republic. Eastern Germans therefore feared the reintroduction of harsh measures of oppression as reunification came to fruition.

Unfortunately, the years following reunification did see an increase in homophobic violence in Germany, likely influenced by the economic and social upheaval that was occurring in the country at the time. The 2000s has been a more optimistic time for LGBTQ activism in Germany, however, with same sex civil unions being officially recognized in 2001 and same sex marriage guaranteed in 2017.

=== Present ===
The Sonntags-Club is still active today, though in a different capacity than its original form. Its current location is Geinfehegener Straße 28 in Berlin. The modern Sonntags-Club offers services in counseling (individual and groups), consciousness-raising, and community building. Additionally, all of its individual counseling can be accessed in both German and English. The center is open for any LGBTQ+ identifying person as well as family members, friends, or allies looking to be more involved. The Sonntags-Club can also provide services in the legal realm regarding LGBTQ+ issues, with lawyers on staff to help with concerns that involve equal rights.

In addition to the LGBTQ+ advocacy and counseling resources made available by the Sonntags-Club, they also run a public-facing café, the proceeds of which are donated to causes regarding LGBTQ+ individuals. Various community events are hosted here such as live music, film screenings, panels, and art exhibits. The Sonntags-Club supports LGBTQ+ initiatives internationally and locally in the Berlin context, particularly in the realm of under-told histories and writing contests. Almost exclusively volunteer driven, the club is a major resource for LGBTQ+ peoples in Berlin.

== Place within the Western LGBT movement ==
Although homosexuality was officially decriminalized in East Germany in 1968 and casual sex among heterosexuals was becoming commonplace, life remained difficult for East Germans who identified outside of the heteronormative system. The larger Western sexual revolution was driven by discourse and the commodification of sex, in part thanks to greater availability of birth control and abortions. While Western media was not allowed into East Germany, day visits by those part of western gay movements sparked working relationships, discourse, and organization of groups like the HIB. The founding of the HIB was inspired by pro-LGBT movements and media in Western Germany, specifically the film by Rosa von Praunheim, "Nicht der Homosexuelle ist pervers, sondern die Situation in der er lebt." The HIB was shaped both by socialist, working-class values and the liberation-focused narratives of western groups, such as the Homosexuelle Aktion Westberlin.

== Notable people ==
Ursula Sillge, born 1946, was the founder of the Sonntags-Club and former member of the HIB. She was extremely prolific in the East German queer scene, and sponsored countless events, fundraisings, and gatherings for youth. As a lesbian herself, Sillge was very active in the movement to include more lesbian voices in the discussion on LGBT discrimination and suffering. Much of her early activism as a member of HIB was lesbian specific, such as the lesbian meetings she began organizing in 1978. Sillge was critical and outspoken about the exclusion of lesbians in many advocacy groups that catered to gay men. After the HIB's dissolution and the formation of the Sonntags-Club Sillge became much more involved in general LGBT advocacy outside of the scope of lesbian affairs.

Peter Rausch was one of two founders of the Homosexuelle Interessengemeinschaft Berlin, the group that preceded the Sonntags-Club. He founded the group after seeing the film "Nicht der Homosexuelle ist pervers, sondern die Situation in der er lebt" with Michael Eggert, his co-founder. Peter Rausch continued his activism after the HIB's dissolution with the Sonntags-Club, leading a discussion group within the organization on bisexuality. Since the late 90s he has been involved in new media and has published texts such as "Die bisexuelle Natur des Menschen – eine soziale Chance." Recently, Rausch published his first novel titled HomoBlocker in 2014.

Michael Eggert, the cofounder of HIB, also remained active in LGBT activism after HIB's end – though he was more involved in religious organizations such as "Gays in the Church" than was Rausch. In 2013 a documentary film titled "OUT IN OST-BERLIN: LESBEN & SCHWULE IN DER DDR” (Out in East-Berlin: Lesbians and Gays in the GDR) Michael Eggert is featured in a prominent role. Both he and Rausch were outspoken about the flaws with East German society and the way in which queer individuals were made to conduct themselves as a result.

== See also ==
- Ursula Sillge
- Same sex marriage in Germany
- LGBT rights in Germany
