= I Am My Own Wife =

2003 play by Doug Wright

- Original Lyceum Theatre window card, 2003
- Original language: English
- Written by: Doug Wright
- Characters: Charlotte von Mahlsdorf, et al.
- Subject: A biography of Charlotte von Mahlsdorf
- Genre: Drama
- Setting: Berlin, Germany

Premiere
- Date: 27 May 2003
- Place: Playwrights Horizons; New York City, New York

I Am My Own Wife is a play by Doug Wright based on his conversations with the German antiquarian Charlotte von Mahlsdorf. The one-person play premiered Off-Broadway in 2003 at Playwrights Horizons. It opened on Broadway later that year. The play was developed with Moisés Kaufman and his Tectonic Theater Project, and Kaufman also acted as director. Jefferson Mays starred in the Broadway and Off-Broadway productions, playing some forty roles. Wright received the 2004 Pulitzer Prize for Drama for the work.

With his play I Am My Own Wife, Wright tied in with the film I Am My Own Woman by avant-garde director Rosa von Praunheim (1992). Film and play are based on von Mahlsdorf's autobiography, first issued in 1992, translated in 1995.

== Plot synopsis ==
I Am My Own Wife is an examination of the life of German antiquarian Charlotte von Mahlsdorf, who killed her father when she was a young child and survived the Nazi and Communist regimes in East Berlin as a transgender woman.

== Productions ==
I Am My Own Wife began with Moises Kauffman and Doug Wright at About Face Theatre in Chicago in 2002, and moved to Broadway in 2004 where it won the Tony Awards for Best Actor in a Play (Mays) and for Best Play. It was first produced as a workshop in July 2001 at the La Jolla Playhouse in La Jolla, California.

== Premieres ==
In 2004, the play had its European premiere at the Stockholm City Theatre, Stockholm, starring Björn Kjellman. In 2005, it had its American regional premiere at Ensemble Theatre of Cincinnati, starring Todd Almond. That production then traveled to Actors Theatre of Louisville and Florida Studio Theatre. In 2006, the play was staged in Hudson, New York at Stageworks/Hudson starring Broadway actor Jeffrey Kuhn, in Toronto, Ontario, at CanStage, with Stephen Ouimette in the starring role, in Vancouver, British Columbia, at the Playhouse Theatre with Canadian actor Tom Rooney, at the Saidye Bronfman Centre in Montreal with actor Brett Christopher, in Portland, Oregon, at the Gerding Theater starring actor Wade McCollum, in Portland, Maine, at the Portland Stage Company starring actor Tom Ford, and in Ann Arbor, Michigan, at the Performance Network Theatre starring actor Malcolm Tulip. In January 2007, the San Pedro Playhouse in San Antonio, Texas successfully mounted the play. It was also performed at the George Street Playhouse, New Brunswick, New Jersey from January 16, 2007, to February 11, 2007. It featured Mark Nelson, and was directed by Anders Cato. Vince Gatton performed the role in a production directed by Andrew Volkoff at Barrington Stage Company in 2008. A French translation (Ma femme, c'est moi) was performed in February 2009 at Théâtre du Rideau Vert in Montreal. It also ran at the Signature Theatre in Arlington, Virginia, starring Helen Hayes award winner Andrew Long, and directed by Alan Paul, and at Theater Three in Port Jefferson, New York, featuring Jeffrey Sanzel.

Between May 6 and May 23, 2009, it played in Tasmania at the Earl Arts Centre in Launceston, and the Theatre Royal, Hobart Backspace, produced by the Tasmanian Theatre Company and featuring Robert Jarman.

In the Czech Republic, the play was premiered in 2008 by Divadlo Letí in Prague, starring Pavol Smolárik. At the same time it was also staged by a Czech non-professional theater group with Libor Ulovec in the role. The latter was awarded the Best Czech Non-Professional Drama Performance 2009 and Libor Ulovec received (among others) the Best Czech Non-Professional Actor Prize 2009.

In Mexico it is starring by the actor Hector Bonilla who, on January 23, 2010, accomplished 100 performances, with 89 standing ovations by that time. It was also performed in Gettysburg, Pennsylvania, at Gettysburg Stage starring actor Eric Jones.

In Minneapolis, Minnesota, the play was part of the renowned Jungle Theater's 2011–2012 season. It was directed by Joel Sass in that venue, and Bradley Greenwald embodied the stageful of characters in an amazing tour de force performance. It ran from November 4 though December 18.

In Greece, I Am My Own Wife had its premiere in January 2011, in Bios Basement, Athens. It was produced by Degreezero Theatre Company, translated and directed by Iossif Vardakis and performed by Haris Attonis with the original music of Marietta Fafouti who also composed a special song for the show, named "Ich Erinnere Mich" — lyrics by Dimitris Dimopoulos. It went on for 20 performances and carried on for the following season, moving to 104 theatre, in Athens and opening in November 2011 for the second run. It has received great acceptance and outstanding critiques both for the whole of the show but for Haris Attonis' exceptional performance, as well. The play itself and the story of Charlotte are very well-timed with the political and social situation in Greece. The staging itself is very minimal and it has been considered to be one of the most emotional presentations, internationally and there have been innovations like the beard and the lack of the head scarf, for the very first time. Haris Attonis won the 2012 Best Male Theatre Performance Award for I Am My Own Wife in Athens Voice Best Choice and Audience Awards and Marietta Fafouti won the 2012 Best Original Theatre Music for I Am My Own Wife in the Gay Theatre Awards.

I Am My Own Wife returned to Chicago's About Face Theatre in November 2016 in a re-imagined production directed by artistic director Andrew Volkoff using four actors and featuring Delia Kropp in the role of Charlotte von Mahlsdorf. This production marks the first known professional performance of the role by a trans actor. It was met with high praise from area critics as well as the author.

I Am My Own Wife opened on March 14, 2019, at Out Front Theatre Company in Atlanta, Georgia featuring Peter Smith playing all roles in the show. This production marked the first professional production where a trans/gender-non-conforming performer portrays all characters in the piece.

A production in 2020 at the Long Wharf Theatre, New Haven, starred Mason Alexander Park.

I Am My Own Wife opened at Spokane's Stage Left Theater on April 9, 2021. Transgender actress Maeve Griffith performed all roles. The play was directed by Troy Nickerson. The production was performed worldwide over the Internet due to COVID-19 restrictions.

== Awards and nominations ==
- 2004: Drama Desk Award for Best New Play
- 2004: Drama League Award for Best Play
- 2004: Lucille Lortel Awards Outstanding Solo Show
- 2004: Pulitzer Prize for Drama
- 2004: Tony Award for Best Play (Won)
- 2004: Tony Award for Best Lead Actor in a Play (Jefferson Mays) (Won)
- 2004: Tony Award for Best Direction of a Play
- 2004: Lambda Literary Award for Drama
