= Dorothea Marie of Saxe-Gotha-Altenburg =

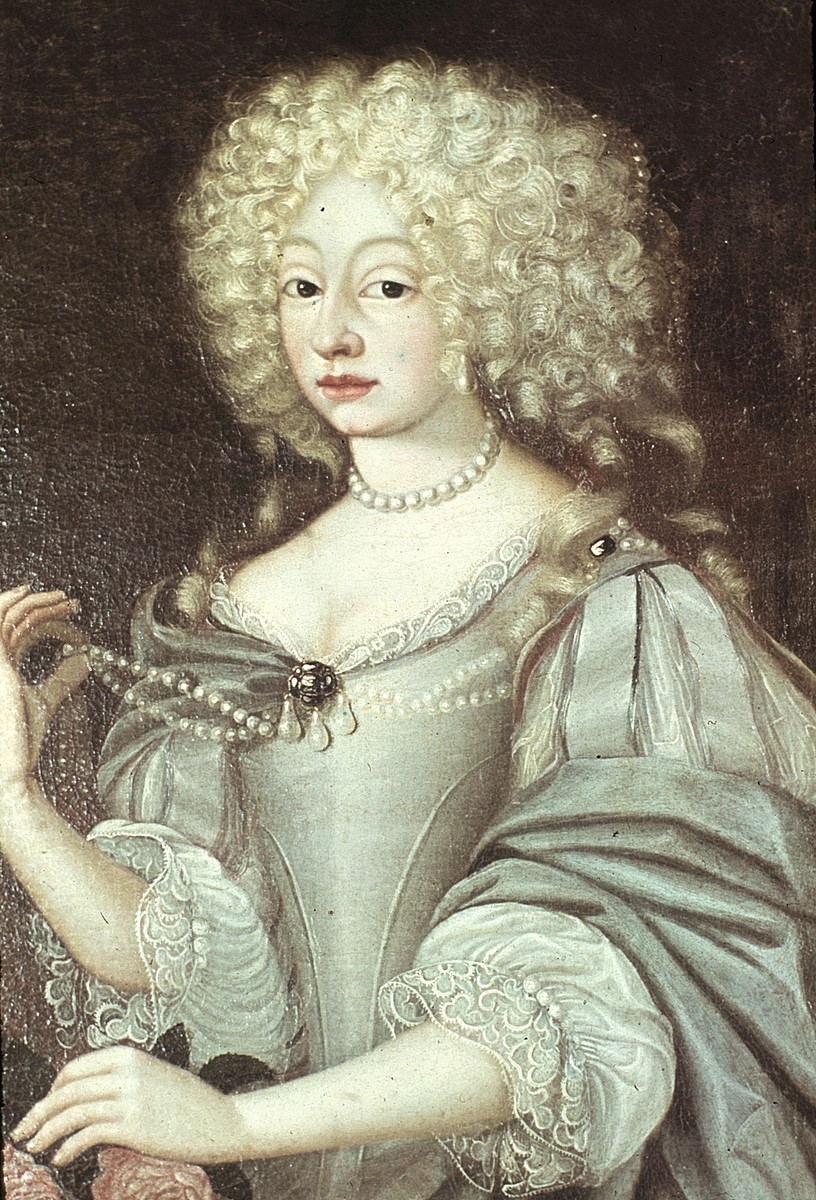

Duchess consort of Saxe-Meiningen
- Tenure: 27 April 1706 – 18 April 1713
- Born: 22 January 1674; Gotha
- Died: 18 April 1713 (aged 39); Meiningen
- Spouse: Ernst Ludwig I, Duke of Saxe-Meiningen (m. 1704)
- Issue: Joseph Bernhard, Hereditary Prince of Saxe-Meiningen; Prince Friedrich August; Ernest Louis II; Luise Dorothea, Duchess of Saxe-Gotha-Altenburg; Charles Frederick
- House: Saxe-Gotha-Altenburg
- Father: Frederick I, Duke of Saxe-Gotha-Altenburg
- Mother: Magdalena Sybille of Saxe-Weissenfels

Dorothea Marie of Saxe-Gotha-Altenburg (22 January 1674 – 18 April 1713) was Duchess of Saxe-Meiningen as the first wife of Ernst Ludwig I, Duke of Saxe-Meiningen. She was the daughter of Frederick I, Duke of Saxe-Gotha-Altenburg and his first wife, Magdalena Sybille of Saxe-Weissenfels. She married Ernst Ludwig I on the 19 September 1704.

== Issue ==
1. Josef Bernhard (b. Meiningen, 27 May 1706 d. Rome, 22 March 1724)
2. Friedrich August (b. Meiningen, 4 November 1707 d. Meiningen 25 Dec 1707)
3. Ernst Ludwig II, Duke of Saxe-Meiningen (b. Coburg, 8 August 1709 d. Meiningen, 24 February 1729)
4. Luise Dorothea (b. Meiningen, 7 December 1710 d. Gotha, 22 October 1771) married on 17 September 1729 to Frederick III, Duke of Saxe-Gotha-Altenburg
5. Karl Frederick, Duke of Saxe-Meiningen (b. Meiningen, 18 July 1712 d. Meiningen, 28 March 1743).

Dorothea Marie of Saxe-Gotha-Altenburg House of Saxe-Gotha-Altenburg Cadet branch of the April Born: 22 January Died: 1674 18
Royal titles
Preceded by Elisabeth Eleonore of Brunswick-Wolfenbüttel	Duchess consort of Saxe-Meiningen; 27 April 1706–18 April 1713	Vacant Title next held by Elisabeth Sophie of Brandenburg
