= Prince August of Saxe-Gotha-Altenburg =

German prince (1747–1806)

Prince August
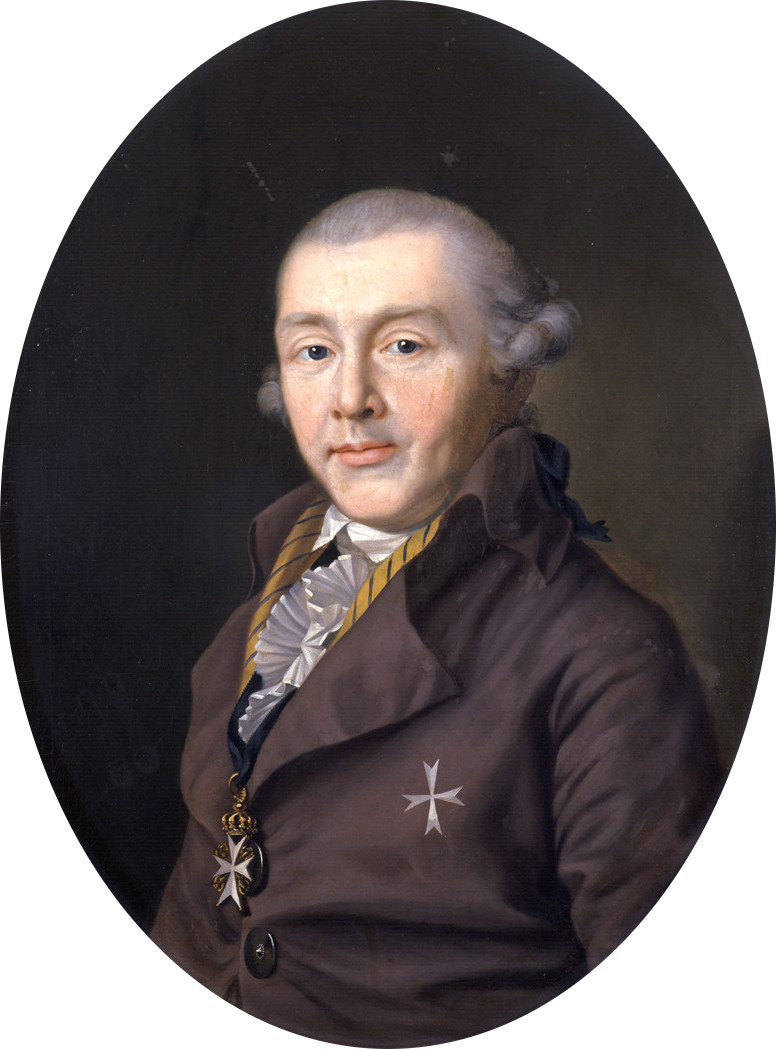
- August of Saxe-Gotha-Altenburg by Ernst Christian Specht, 1795
- Born: 14 August 1747; Gotha, Thuringia, Germany
- Died: 28 September 1806 (aged 59); Gotha, Thuringia, Germany
- House: Saxe-Gotha-Altenburg
- Father: Frederick III, Duke of Saxe-Gotha-Altenburg
- Mother: Princess Luise Dorothea of Saxe-Meiningen

Prince August of Saxe-Gotha-Altenburg (14 August 1747, in Gotha – 28 September 1806, in Gotha) was a German prince of the Saxe-Gotha-Altenburg line of the Ernestine Wettins and a patron of the arts during the Age of Enlightenment.

== Life ==
He was the youngest child of Frederick III, Duke of Saxe-Gotha-Altenburg and his wife Princess Luise Dorothea of Saxe-Meiningen. Their mother made sure both August and his brother Ernest received a good education in literature, science and cameralism. He and Ernest also travelled to the Netherlands and England between 1768 and 1769.

August's parents had planned a military career for him, but he gave this up in 1769, handing over his Gotha infantry regiment in 's-Hertogenbosch to his nephew Frederick. August then took a Grand Tour to Italy from 1771 to 1777 and got to know Voltaire in Geneva. In 1777 he was also in London as one of three godparents to Princess Sophia of the United Kingdom, his first cousin once removed (Sophia's father's mother Augusta was August's father's younger sister).

Considered to be an enlightened, open-minded and progressive prince, he gathered a witty circle around him at his palace in Gotha from 1778 onwards. He was also considered as one of the most important translator of French literature into Weimar Classicism. He also had a lively correspondence with Johann Wolfgang von Goethe, Johann Gottfried Herder and Christoph Martin Wieland, being considered a particular supporter of Wieland, to whose Oberon he was especially devoted.

== Sources ==
- (in German) Prince August of Saxe-Gotha-Altenburg In: Allgemeine Deutsche Biographie (ADB). Band 1, Duncker & Humblot, Leipzig 1875, S. 681.
- (in German) Götz Eckardt (Hrsg.): Das italienische Reisetagebuch des Prinzen August von Sachsen-Gotha-Altenburg, des Freundes von Herder, Wieland und Goethe. Stendal 1985
