= Ernst Ludwig I =

Duke of Saxe-Meiningen from 1706 to 1724

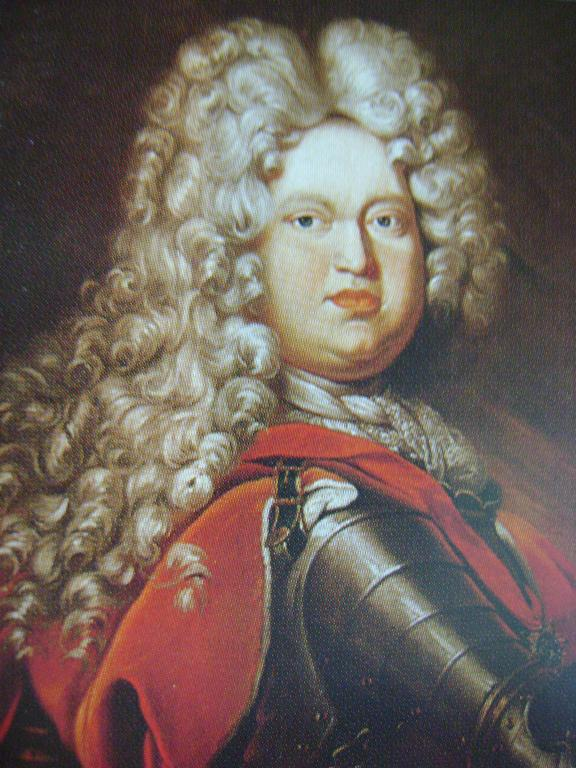
- Early 18th-century portrait

Duke of Saxe-Meiningen
- Reign: 27 April 1706 – 24 November 1724
- Predecessor: Bernhard I
- Successor: Ernest Louis II
- Born: 7 October 1672; Gotha
- Died: 24 November 1724 (aged 52); Meiningen
- Spouse: Dorothea Marie of Saxe-Gotha (m. 1704; died 1713) Elisabeth Sophie of Brandenburg (m. 1714)
- Issue: Prince Joseph Bernhard, Hereditary Prince of Saxe-Meiningen; Prince Friedrich August; Ernest Louis II; Luise Dorothea, Duchess of Saxe-Gotha-Altenburg; Charles Frederick
- House: Saxe-Meiningen
- Father: Bernhard I, Duke of Saxe-Meiningen
- Mother: Marie Hedwig of Hesse-Darmstadt
- Religion: Lutheranism

Ernst Ludwig I, Duke of Saxe-Meiningen (7 October 1672 – 24 November 1724) was a German (Saxon) nobleman.

== Biography ==
He was born in Gotha, the eldest son of Bernhard I, Duke of Saxe-Meiningen, and his first wife, Marie Hedwig of Hesse-Darmstadt.

After the death of his father in 1706, Ernst Ludwig inherited the duchy of Saxe-Meiningen jointly with his brother, Frederick Wilhelm, and his half-brother, Anton Ulrich. His father, in his will, had stipulated that the duchy never be divided and that it be governed jointly by his sons.

The oldest brother, Ernst Ludwig, strove to establish autonomy for himself and his descendants. Immediately after the death of his father, Ernst Ludwig signed a contract with his brothers; in consideration of certain inducements, the brothers had to leave the government of the duchy in his hands. This introduction of primogeniture failed, however; his brothers managed to govern again after Ernst Ludwig's death, acting as guardians for his sons.

Ernst Ludwig married Dorothea Marie of Saxe-Gotha-Altenburg, his cousin in Gotha on 19 September 1704. They had five children:

1. Josef Bernhard (b. Meiningen, 27 May 1706 – d. Rome, 22 March 1724) died aged 17 without issue.
2. Friedrich August (b. Meiningen, 4 November 1707 – d. Meiningen, 25 December 1707) died in infancy.
3. Ernst Ludwig II, Duke of Saxe-Meiningen (b. Coburg, 8 August 1709 – d. Meiningen, 24 February 1729).
4. Luise Dorothea (b. Meiningen, 10 August 1710 – d. Gotha, 22 October 1767), married on 17 September 1729 to Frederick III, Duke of Saxe-Gotha-Altenburg.
5. Karl Frederick, Duke of Saxe-Meiningen (b. Meiningen, 18 July 1712 – d. Meiningen, 28 March 1743).

In Schloss Ehrenburg, Coburg on 3 June 1714, Ernst Ludwig married his second wife, Elisabeth Sophie of Brandenburg. They had no children.

He died in Meiningen in 1724.

== Ancestors ==
Ancestors of Ernst Ludwig I

8. John II, Duke of Saxe-Weimar
4. Ernest I, Duke of Saxe-Gotha
9. Dorothea Maria of Anhalt
2. Bernhard I, Duke of Saxe-Meiningen
10. John Philip, Duke of Saxe-Altenburg
5. Princess Elisabeth Sophie of Saxe-Altenburg
11. Elisabeth of Brunswick-Wolfenbüttel
1. Ernst Ludwig I, Duke of Saxe-Meiningen'
12. Louis V, Landgrave of Hesse-Darmstadt
6. George II, Landgrave of Hesse-Darmstadt
13. Magdalene of Brandenburg
3. Marie Hedwig of Hesse-Darmstadt
14. John George I, Elector of Saxony
7. Sophia Eleonore of Saxony
15. Magdalene Sybille of Prussia

Ernst Ludwig I House of Saxe-Meiningen Cadet branch of the House of Wettin Born: 7 October 1672 Died: 24 November 1724
Regnal titles
Preceded by Bernhard I	Duke of Saxe-Meiningen; 1706–1724	Succeeded by Ernst Ludwig II
