= Teamtheater =

Theatre in Munich, Bavaria, Germany

Coordinates: 48°08′00″N 11°34′28″E

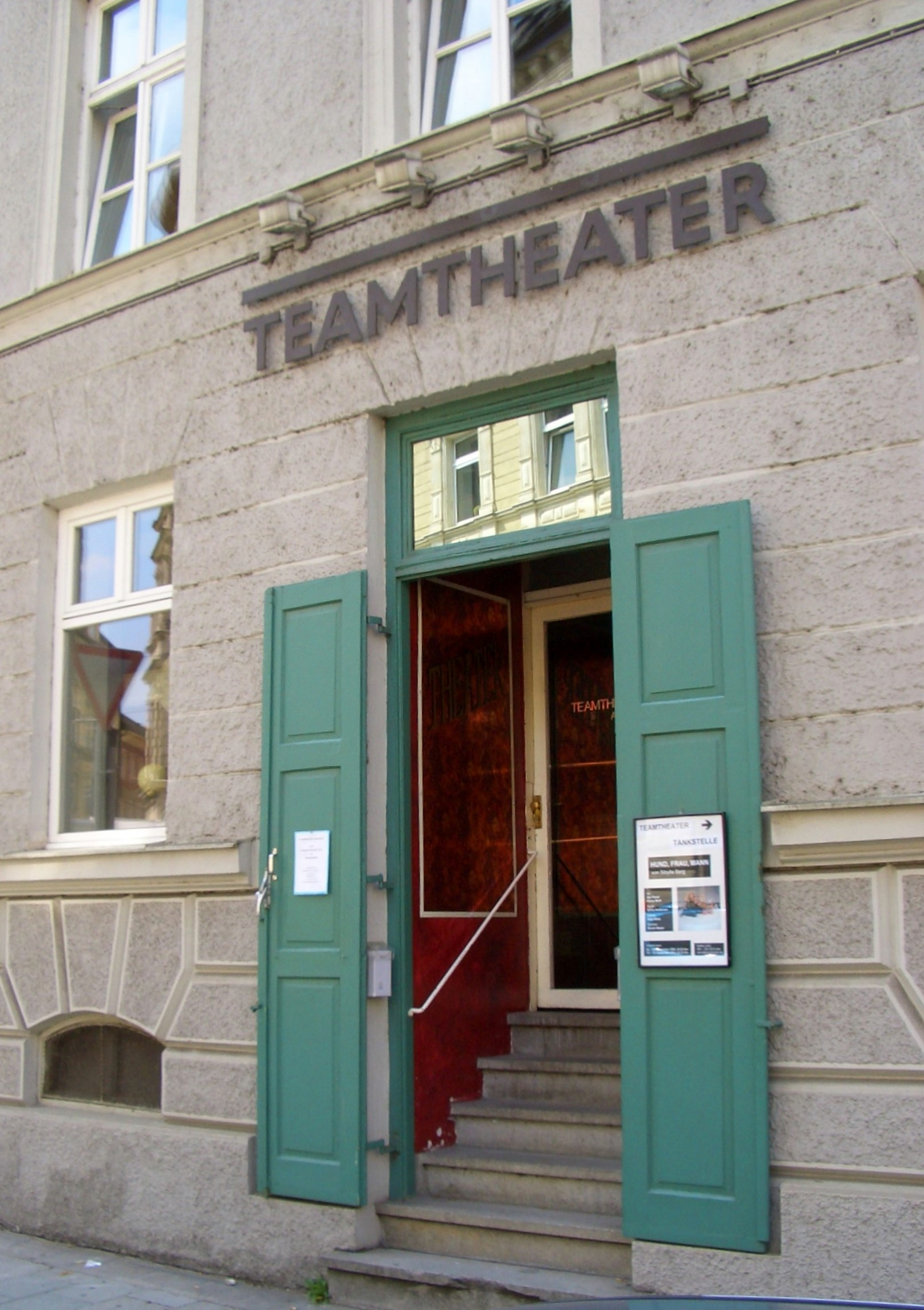
Teamtheater entrance

Teamtheater is a theatre in Munich, Bavaria, Germany former known as Theater am Einlaß.
