= Untermaßfeld =

- Municipality
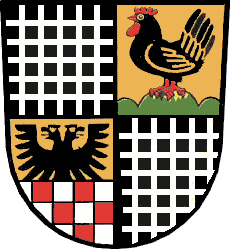
- Coat of arms

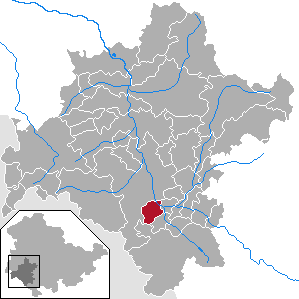
- Location of Untermaßfeld within Schmalkalden-Meiningen district
- Interactive map of Untermaßfeld
- Location within Germany Location within Thuringia
- Coordinates: 50°32′N 10°25′E
- Country: Germany
- State: Thuringia
- District: Schmalkalden-Meiningen

Government
  - Mayor (2022–28): Michael Trampler

Area
  - Total: 10.79 km^{2} (4.17 sq mi)
- Elevation: 295 m (968 ft)

Population (2025-12-31)
  - Total: 1,220
  - Density: 113/km^{2} (293/sq mi)
- Time zone: UTC+01:00 (CET)
  - Summer (DST): UTC+02:00 (CEST)
- Postal codes: 98617
- Dialling codes: 036949
- Vehicle registration: SM

Untermaßfeld is a municipality in the district Schmalkalden-Meiningen, in Thuringia, Germany.

== Notable people ==
- Ursula Sillge
