= John Edward Heys =

American actor

John Edward Heys (born April 24, 1954) is an American independent filmmaker, actor and writer who lives and works in Berlin.

== Life and career ==
John Edward Heys was born and raised in New Jersey. Upon his father's death two days after Heys' 12th birthday, he was enrolled and educated (grades 7 thru 12) at a private boarding school in northern New Jersey. After graduating from secondary school, Heys moved to Miami Shores, Florida, to the home of his maternal aunts.

After two semesters of college majoring in Liberal Arts, Heys moved to New York City in 1968 and became part of the East Village and West Village alternative life and LGBTQ culture. In August 1969, he founded America's first bi-monthly newspaper for the LGBTQ community, Gay Power, the official title totaling 24 issues, and was editor until August 1970. One of its covers was created by Robert Mapplethorpe. The newspaper also contained illustrations by Touko Laaksonen, better known as Tom of Finland, and featured contributors such as Arthur Bell, Taylor Mead, Charles Ludlam, Pudgy Roberts, Bill Vehr, Pat Maxwell, Clayton Cole, as well as columns from all of the active LGBSTG groups, from the most conservative Mattachine Society to the most radical The Gay Liberation Front, and all the other groups in between. Heys created several one-man performance pieces and acted with Cookie Mueller, H.M. Koutoukas, Charles Ludlam, Ethyl Eichelberger and as part of the Angels of Light NYC Group, which Hibiscus founded after moving to NYC. Heys was a subject for artists Peter Hujar, Francesco Clemente, Charles Ludlam, Richard Banks, Frank Moore and numerous other photographers. Heys was a close friend and muse of photographer Peter Hujar and the subject of many portraits. Hujar once remarked upon Heys' resemblance to Diana Vreeland, "I can take a picture of her and another of you and there is a resemblance". In Berlin he was a friend of Charlotte von Mahlsdorf, the Neue Deutsche Welle (New Wave) band Die Tödliche Doris, and radical gay activist Napoleon Seyfarth. Heys made two films of Charlotte von Mahlsdorf and one of Napoleon Seyfarth and was the subject of an 8mm short film that Wolfgang Mueller made in 1984 in the legendary 1930s bordello, Pensione Florian.

Heys' films have been screened at many worldwide film festivals.

== Theater (actor) ==
- Le Bourgeois Avant Garde, 1982
- Galas, 1983
- Sounds in The Distance, 1984, by David Wojnarowicz The Berlin Debut in 1984, and a second production in Brooklyn, New York, late 1980s
- Salammbo, 1985, by Charles Ludlam
- The Roman Polanski Story, by Gary Indiana, Heys portraying Polanski.
- Homage to Diana Vreeland Heys portrayed Diana Vreeland in several solo performances at LaMama ETC
- The Woman with Pearls, 1980's
- Nose to Nose, with Suzanne Fletcher NYC, 1980's
- Poverty in the Penthouse - La Mamounia, Berlin 1984- NYC, late 1980s
- Nerris the Nurse, to Ethyl Eichelberger's Medea. (Premier) Club 57 NYC, approximately performances, at Snafu, Paradise Garage, other venues. 1980's
- Cookie Mueller & John Heys Together at Last, Cafe Schmidt, NYC, March 1981

== Film actor ==
- John Heys Singt, directed by Wolfgang Müller
- Final Reward, directed by Rachid Kerdouche, 1978
- Triple Bogey on a Par Five Hole, directed by Amos Poe
- Agnes und Sein Bruder, Oscar Rolle-Berlin early 2000s

== Theatre (director) ==
- The Human Voice, starring Alba Clemente, NYC Early 1990s

== Filmmaker ==
- The Moroccan Bride, 1987 Premiere, Millennium, NYC
- Charlotte in Sweden, 1998 Premiere Berlinale -Panorama
- Golden Earrings, 2000 Premiere at original Arsenal -Berlin
- Alarm, 2001 Festival circuit
- Cooch Dance, 2008 Berlinale
- The La Ronde Superclub, 2008 Berlinale
- Das Ende des Schweins ist der Anfang der Wurst ("End of the Pig and Start of the Sausage"), 2009, Napoleon Seyfarth, Documentary, Premiere Berlinale-Panorama
- Charlotte, 2009 Festival circuit
- Warum Madam Warum, 2011, with Zazie De Paris, Premiere Berlinale -Panorama
- A Lazy Summer Afternoon with Mario Montez, 2011 Premiere Berlinale-Panorama
- "The Actress" with Zazie De Paris, 2013
- Madame Arthur, 2015, Shortfilm with Zazie de Paris
- "The Lift" 2018
- "STROLL." 2021

== Film festivals ==
- Berlinale Panorama, Berlin 2009
- 56. Internationale Kurzfilmtage, Oberhausen 2010
- Oslo Gay and Lesbian Film Festival, Oslo 2011,
- LLAMALEH - Uruguay International Film Festival of Sexual and Gender Diversity, Montevideo 2011
- Paris Gay, Lesbian, Trans Film Festival - Chéries-Chéris, Paris 2011
- The Barcelona International Gay and Lesbian Film Festival, Barcelona 2011
- Annual Pink Screens, Brussels 2011
- Berlinale Panorama, Berlin 2012
- Rio Festival Gay de Cinema, Rio de Janeiro 2012
- OutView Film Festival, Athens 2012
- Künstlerhaus Mousonturm, Frankfurt am Main 2012
