= Bernhard I of Saxe-Meiningen =

Duke of Saxe-Meiningen from 1691 to 1706

Bernhard I
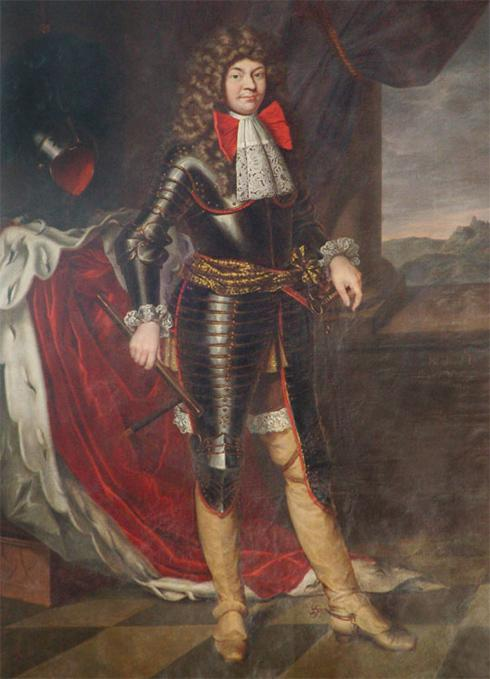
- Portrait, 1690s

Duke of Saxe-Meiningen
- Reign: 2 August 1691 – 27 April 1706
- Predecessor: New creation
- Successor: Ernst Ludwig I
- Born: 10 September 1649; Gotha
- Died: 27 April 1706 (aged 56); Meiningen
- Spouse: Marie Hedwig of Hesse-Darmstadt (m. 1671; died 1680) Elisabeth Eleonore of Brunswick-Wolfenbüttel (m. 1681)
- Issue: Ernst Ludwig I Prince Bernhard; Prince Johann Ernst; Princess Marie Elisabeth; Prince Johann Georg; Frederick Wilhelm; Prince Georg Ernst; Princess Elisabeth Ernestine; Princess Eleonore Frederika; Prince Anton August; Wilhelmine Luise, Duchess of Württemberg-Bernstadt; Anton Ulrich
- House: Wettin (Ernestine line) (by birth); Saxe-Meiningen (founder)
- Father: Ernst I, Duke of Saxe-Coburg-Altenburg
- Mother: Elisabeth Sophie of Saxe-Altenburg
- Religion: Lutheran

Bernhard I, Duke of Saxe-Meiningen (10 September 1649 – 27 April 1706) was a duke of Saxe-Meiningen.

== Biography ==
He was the sixth but third surviving son of Ernst I, Duke of Saxe-Coburg-Altenburg and Elisabeth Sophie of Saxe-Altenburg.

After the death of his father, in 1675, the duchy was jointly governed by him and his brothers; but the duchy was divided five years later (in 1680); as a result of this divisionary treaty, Bernhard received Meiningen, Wasungen, Salzungen, Untermassfeld, Frauenbreitungen and Ichtershausen. Bernhard became the founder of the Saxe-Meiningen line.

The building of an official residence in Meiningen began immediately. The residence was finished in 1692 and was called Schloss Elisabethenburg, in honor of Bernhard's second wife. Like his brother Ernst, Bernhard's financial stability in his duchy was remarkable. The sales of chamber goods and the additional charge of taxes to the population were the result.

Bernhard's will ordered the indivisibility of the duchy, but not Primogeniture. This allowed his sons to govern the duchy jointly after his death.

== Issue ==
He married in Schloss Friedenstein, Gotha, on 20 November 1671 Marie Hedwig of Hesse-Darmstadt. They had seven children:

1. Ernst Ludwig I, Duke of Saxe-Meiningen (b. Gotha, 7 October 1672 – d. Meiningen, 24 November 1724).
2. Bernhard (b. Gotha, 28 October 1673 – d. Brussels, 25 October 1694) died age 20 without issue.
3. Johann Ernst (b. Gotha, 29 December 1674 – d. Gotha, 8 February 1675) died in infancy.
4. Marie Elisabeth (b. Ichtershausen, 11 August 1676 – d. Ichtershausen, 22 December 1676) died in infancy.
5. Johann Georg (b. Ichtershausen, 3 October 1677 – d. Ichtershausen, 10 October 1678) died in infancy.
6. Frederick Wilhelm, Duke of Saxe-Meiningen (b. Ichtershausen, 16 February 1679 – d. Meiningen, 10 March 1746).
7. Georg Ernst (b. Ichtershausen, 26 March 1680 – d. of smallpox, Meiningen, 1 January 1699) died age 18 without issue.

He married secondly in Schöningen on 25 January 1681 Elisabeth Eleonore of Brunswick-Wolfenbüttel daughter of Anthony Ulrich, Duke of Brunswick-Wolfenbüttel. They had five children:

1. Elisabeth Ernestine (b. Meiningen, 3 December 1681 – d. Gandersheim, 24 December 1766), Abbess of Gandersheim Abbey (1713–1766), never married or had issue.
2. Eleonore Frederika (b. Meiningen, 2 March 1683 – d. Meiningen, 13 May 1739), a nun at Gandersheim, never married or had issue
3. Anton August (b. Meiningen, 20 June 1684 – d. Meiningen, 7 December 1684) died in infancy.
4. Wilhelmine Luise (b. Meiningen, 19 January 1686 – d. Bernstadt, 5 October 1753), married on 20 December 1703 to Charles, Duke of Württemberg-Bernstadt.
5. Anton Ulrich, Duke of Saxe-Meiningen (b. Meiningen, 22 October 1687 – d. Frankfurt, 27 January 1763).

== Ancestry ==
Ancestors of Bernhard I of Saxe-Meiningen

8. Johann Wilhelm, Duke of Saxe-Weimar
4. John II, Duke of Saxe-Weimar
9. Dorothea Susanne of Simmern
2. Ernest I, Duke of Saxe-Gotha
10. Joachim Ernest, Prince of Anhalt
5. Dorothea Maria of Anhalt
11. Eleonore of Württemberg
1. Bernhard I, Duke of Saxe-Meiningen
12. Frederick Wilhelm I, Duke of Saxe-Weimar
6. Johann Philipp, Duke of Saxe-Altenburg
13. Anna Maria of the Palatinate-Neuburg
3. Elisabeth Sophie of Saxe-Altenburg
14. Henry Julius, Duke of Brunswick-Lüneburg
7. Elisabeth of Brünswick-Wolfenbüttel
15. Elizabeth of Denmark

Bernhard I of Saxe-Meiningen House of Saxe-Meiningen Cadet branch of the House of Wettin Born: 10 September 1649 Died: 27 April 1706
Regnal titles
Preceded by New creation	Duke of Saxe-Meiningen; 1675–1706	Succeeded by Ernst Ludwig I
