= Friedrich Wilhelm, Duke of Saxe-Meiningen =

Friedrich Wilhelm
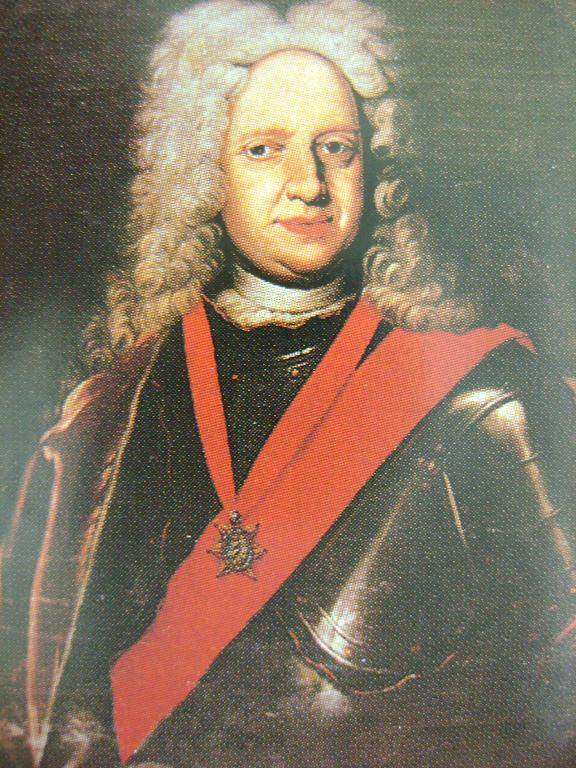
- Portrait, c. 1740

Duke of Saxe-Meiningen
- Reign: 28 March 1743 – 10 March 1746
- Predecessor: Karl Frederick
- Successor: Anthony Ulrich
- Born: 16 February 1679; Ichtershausen
- Died: 10 March 1746 (aged 67); Meiningen
- House: Saxe-Meiningen
- Father: Bernhard I, Duke of Saxe-Meiningen
- Mother: Marie Hedwig of Hesse-Darmstadt

Friedrich Wilhelm, Duke of Saxe-Meiningen (16 February 1679 in Ichtershausen – 10 March 1746 in Meiningen), was a duke of Saxe-Meiningen.

== Life ==
He was the fifth son of Bernhard I, Duke of Saxe-Meiningen and his first wife, Marie Hedwig of Hesse-Darmstadt.

When his father died in 1706, according to his will, he inherited the duchy of Saxe-Meiningen with his older full-brother, Ernst Ludwig I, and his younger half-brother, Anton Ulrich.

But, shortly after, Ernst Ludwig signed a contract between himself and his brothers, and they were compelled to leave full control of the duchy in his hands.

When Ernst Ludwig died (1724), Friedrich Wilhelm and Anton Ulrich took again the government of the duchy as guardians of his nephews until 1733.

After the death of his nephew, Karl Frederick (1743), he inherited the duchy of Saxe-Meiningen.

Friedrich Wilhelm never married and died after only three years of reigning. He was succeeded by his younger half-brother, Anton Ulrich.

== Ancestors ==
Ancestors of Friedrich Wilhelm, Duke of Saxe-Meiningen

8. John II, Duke of Saxe-Weimar
4. Ernest I, Duke of Saxe-Gotha
9. Dorothea Maria of Anhalt
2. Bernhard I, Duke of Saxe-Meiningen
10. John Philip, Duke of Saxe-Altenburg
5. Princess Elisabeth Sophie of Saxe-Altenburg
11. Elisabeth of Brunswick-Wolfenbüttel
1. Friedrich Wilhelm, Duke of Saxe-Meiningen
12. Louis V, Landgrave of Hesse-Darmstadt
6. George II, Landgrave of Hesse-Darmstadt
13. Magdalena von Brandenburg
3. Marie Hedwig of Hesse-Darmstadt
14. John George I, Elector of Saxony
7. Sophia Eleonore of Saxony
15. Duchess Magdalene Sibylle of Prussia

Friedrich Wilhelm, Duke of Saxe-Meiningen House of Saxe-Meiningen Cadet branch of the House of Wettin Born: 16 February 1679 Died: 10 March 1746
Regnal titles
Preceded by Karl Frederick	Duke of Saxe-Meiningen; 1743–1746	Succeeded by Anton Ulrich
