= Frederick III of Saxe-Gotha-Altenburg =

Duke of Saxe-Gotha-Altenburg from 1732 to 1772

Frederick III
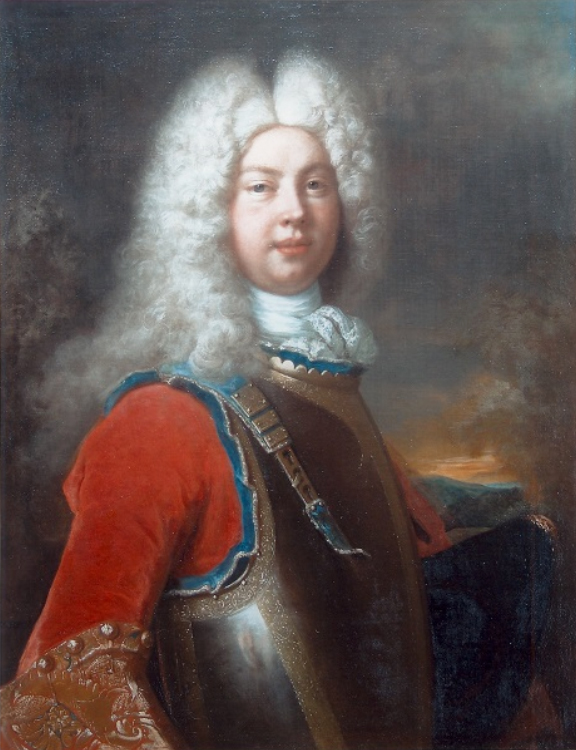

Duke of Saxe-Gotha-Altenburg
- Reign: 23 March 1732 – 10 March 1772
- Predecessor: Frederick II
- Successor: Ernst II
- Born: 14 April 1699; Gotha
- Died: 10 March 1772 (aged 72); Gotha
- Spouse: Princess Luise Dorothea of Saxe-Meiningen (m. 1729; died 1767)
- Issue: Frederick, Hereditary Prince of Saxe-Gotha-Altenburg; Prince Ludwig; Princess Fredericka Luise; Ernst II; Princess Sophie; Prince August
- House: Saxe-Gotha-Altenburg
- Father: Frederick II, Duke of Saxe-Gotha-Altenburg
- Mother: Magdalene Augusta of Anhalt-Zerbst

Frederick III, Duke of Saxe-Gotha-Altenburg (14 April 1699 – 10 March 1772), was a duke of Saxe-Gotha-Altenburg.

== Biography ==
He was born in Gotha, the eldest son of Frederick II, Duke of Saxe-Gotha-Altenburg and Magdalene Augusta of Anhalt-Zerbst.

After the death of his father, in 1732, Frederick III assumed the duchy of Saxe-Gotha-Altenburg.

In 1734 he began a flourishing soldier trade with the Emperor, to the Prince of Waldeck and to the King of Prussia, which put him into the position to create a tax in his own duchy. The duchy had to suffer for Frederick with difficulty in the Seven Years' War. In 1747/1748, Frederick entered war with his neighbour, duke Anton Ulrich of Saxe-Meiningen, an uncle of his wife. The so-called "War of Wasungen", named after a town in the duchy Saxe-Meiningen, was officially caused by a hierarchy conflict between nobles at the princely court in Meiningen in the course of which a noble couple had been illegally arrested. Following the emperor's command, Frederick sent his troops to free the captives. For him, this was an occasion to partly occupy his wife's homeland that was ruled by the elderly Anton Ulrich. This duke did not only prefer to live far away in Frankfurt but was also unequally married. The rising question of legal succession induced Frederick to send about 10% of his army to Saxe-Meiningen until in 1748 the Prussian King Frederick II. mediated a compromise.

Frederick's attempts to be appointed as a member of the Danish Order of the Elephant, a fellowship of which both his father and his grandfather had been members, failed in 1734 due to ceremonial difficulties. After his sister's marriage with Frederick, Prince of Wales, he became knight of the Order of the Garter in 1741. In 1732, he had already received the Polish Order of the White Eagle that was sent to him by post.

== Issue ==
In Gotha on 17 September 1729, Frederick married Luise Dorothea of Saxe-Meiningen, his first cousin. They had nine children:

1. Frederick Louis, Hereditary Prince of Saxe-Gotha-Altenburg (b. Gotha, 20 January 1735 – d. Gotha, 9 June 1756) died unmarried.
2. Louis (b. Gotha, 25 October 1735 – d. Gotha, 26 October 1735) died young.
3. stillborn son (Gotha, 25 October 1735), twin of Louis.
4. stillborn twin sons (1739).
5. Fredericka Louise (b. Gotha, 30 January 1741 – d. Gotha, 5 February 1776) died unmarried.
6. Ernest II, Duke of Saxe-Gotha-Altenburg (b. Gotha, 30 January 1745 – d. Gotha, 20 April 1804).
7. Sophie (b. Gotha, 9 March 1746 – d. Gotha, 30 March 1746) died young.
8. August (b. Gotha, 14 August 1747 – d. Gotha, 28 September 1806).

From 1748 to 1755 he was regent of the Duchy of Saxe-Weimar-Eisenach on behalf of Ernest Augustus II. From 1750, he acted as regent alongside his kinsmen Franz Josias, Duke of Saxe-Coburg-Saalfeld. He died in Gotha, aged 72.

== Ancestors ==
Ancestors of Frederick III of Saxe-Gotha-Altenburg

8. Ernest I, Duke of Saxe-Gotha
4. Frederick I, Duke of Saxe-Gotha-Altenburg
9. Princess Elisabeth Sophie of Saxe-Altenburg
2. Frederick II, Duke of Saxe-Gotha-Altenburg
10. August, Duke of Saxe-Weissenfels
5. Magdalena Sibylle of Saxe-Weissenfels
11. Anna Maria of Mecklenburg-Schwerin
1. Frederick III, Duke of Saxe-Gotha-Altenburg
12. John VI, Prince of Anhalt-Zerbst
6. Prince Charles of Anhalt-Zerbst
13. Sophie Augusta of Holstein-Gottorp
3. Princess Magdalena Augusta of Anhalt-Zerbst
14. August, Duke of Saxe-Weissenfels (= 10)
7. Sophie of Saxe-Weissenfels
15. Anna Maria of Mecklenburg-Schwerin (= 11)

Frederick III of Saxe-Gotha-Altenburg House of Wettin Born: 14 April 1699 Died: 10 March 1772
Regnal titles
Preceded by Frederick II	Duke of Saxe-Gotha-Altenburg; 1732–1772	Succeeded by Ernst II
