= I Am My Own Woman =

- Theatrical release poster
- Directed by: Rosa von Praunheim
- Written by: Valentin Passoni
- Starring: Charlotte von Mahlsdorf; Ichgola Androgyn; Jens Taschner
- Cinematography: Lorenz Haarmann
- Edited by: Mike Shephard
- Music by: Joachim Litty
- Production company: Rosa von Praunheim Filmproduktion
- Release date: 1992
- Running time: 91 minutes
- Country: Germany
- Language: German

I Am My Own Woman (German: Ich bin meine eigene Frau ) is a 1992 German docudrama film directed by Rosa von Praunheim. The film attracted international attention and was shown at the Berlin International Film Festival and the Toronto Film Festival in 1993, for example.

== Plot ==
The trans woman Charlotte von Mahlsdorf recounts incidents from her eventful life. Now elderly, she runs the Gründerzeit Museum, fulfilling her dream of living as a woman from the turn of the 20th century. Scenes of her life are dramatized. Two actors play the young and middle-aged Charlotte and she plays herself in old age.

Life was difficult for Charlotte, growing up as Lothar Berfelde in Nazi Germany during World War II. An effeminate boy, Lothar enjoyed cleaning and dusting at the home of a benevolent great uncle; an early desire to live as a woman finally found an outlet on a vacation to Eastern Prussia in the household of "aunt" Luise, a transgender man, who allows the youth to try out female outfits and dress at home as a girl, and giving Lothar the book The Transvestite by Dr Magnus Hirschfeld to read. Luise also respects the youth's privacy when he finds him having sex in the barn with a farm boy.

Back in Berlin, after the death of a great uncle, the young Lothar is found at the complete mercy of his brutal father. Trying to save his mother and himself from his father's punishments and threats, Lothar bludgeons his father to death, a crime for which he is psychiatrically evaluated and imprisoned. The defeat of Germany during the war and the Allied invasion sets the boy free. Wandering through the street of Berlin, he barely escapes being killed as a deserter by German soldiers.

By 1946, Lothar has come to identify herself as a feminine being in a masculine body. She lives now full-time as a woman under the name Charlotte von Mahlsdorf, "Charlotte" or "Lottchen" being similar to Lothar, and Mahlsdorf referring to the section of Berlin where she lives. She moves into the destroyed Friedrishfelde castle and spends years and a lot of hard work trying to restore it. But eventually, she is expelled by the East German authorities. Working as a domestic in the household of Herbert von Zitzenau, an elderly equestrian officer, she is seduced by her employer and they start a sexual relationship. She explains that she preferred older lovers feeling protected by them the way women do. That affair lasted several years until Zitzenau's health declined and death.

Even though life for gays is difficult under the communist regime of East Germany, they find their way around. Cruising a public restroom, Charlotte meets Joechen, a lover with whom she could be a real woman. Their relation with sadomasochistic role-playing last for 27 years until Joechen's death.

For more than 30 years, Charlotte manages to live her life as a woman in East Germany. She preserves the entire contents of East Berlin's first (and only for many years) gay bar, after the DDR government closed the bar, and moved to demolish the building. Its contents were transferred to the Gründerzeit Museum in Mahlsdorf run by Charlotte and a lesbian couple. In 1989 the elderly Charlotte, very much active, takes a role in the first East German gay film: Heiner Carow's Coming Out. Its premiere coincides with the fall of the Berlin Wall. But even in a unified Germany Charlotte has to face many problems. The German government takes the Gründerzeit Museum and its contents from Charlotte's hands and she and her gay friends are attacked by neo-Nazis during the first joint East–West gay and lesbian gathering. In 1992 her labor is recognized when she receives the Order of Merit of the Federal Republic of Germany for furthering the cause of sexual freedom.

== Cast ==
Two actors play the young and middle-aged Charlotte, and she plays herself in the later years.

- Charlotte von Mahlsdorf - Herself
- Jens Taschner – Lothar age 15-17
- Ichgola Androgyn - Charlotte age 20-40
- Robert Dietl - Herbert von Zitzenau

== Awards ==
1993: FIPRESCI Award at the International Film Festival Rotterdam

== Reception ==
"A moving picture." (Cinema Journal, 1992) "A celebration! Powerful, dramatic and original!" (Gay Times) "Anything but conventional!" (New York Times)
