= Marie Hedwig of Hesse-Darmstadt =

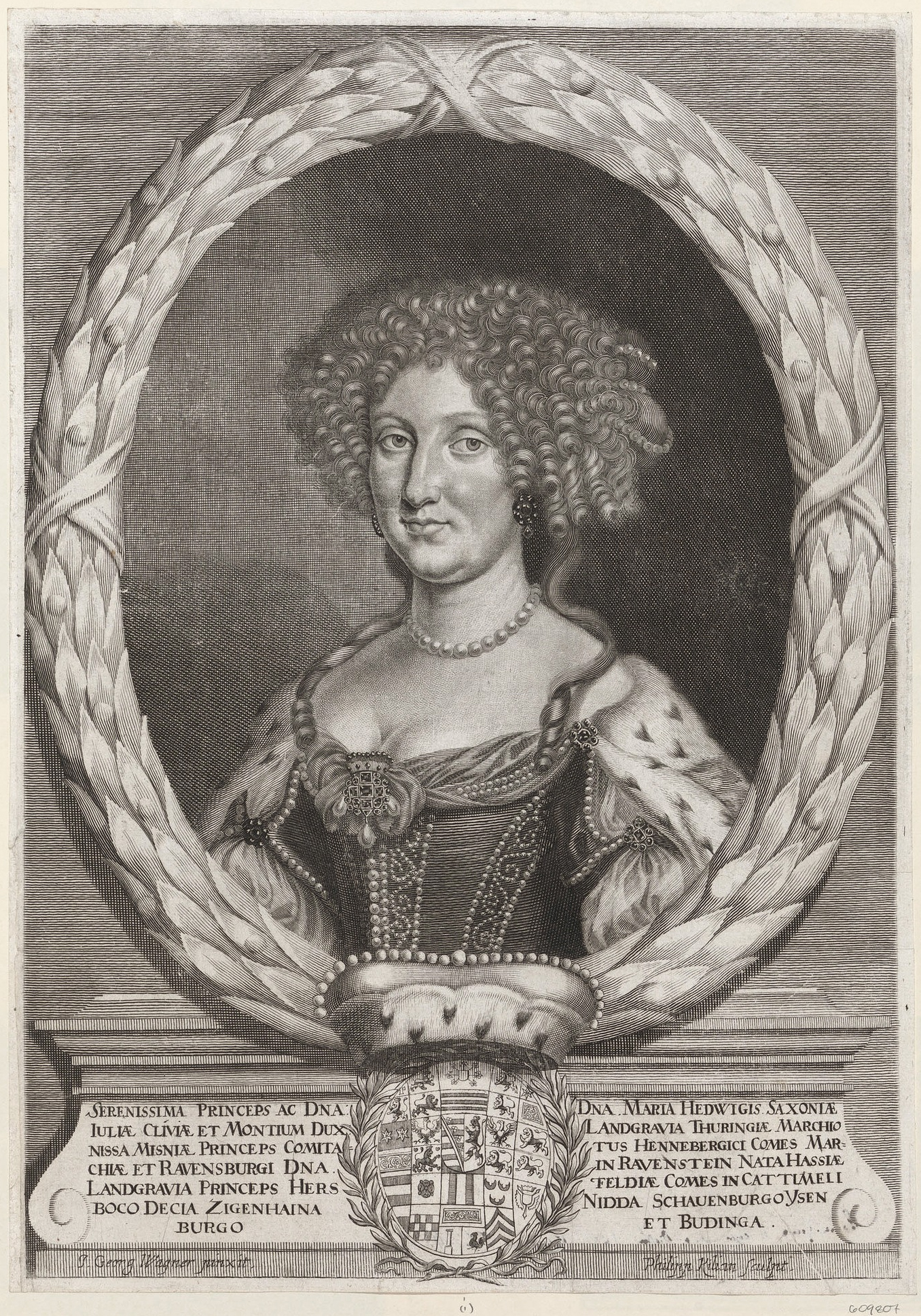

Duchess consort of Saxe-Meiningen
- Tenure: 26 March 1675 – 19 April 1680
- Born: 26 November 1647; Giessen
- Died: 19 April 1680 (aged 32); Ichtershausen
- Burial: City church in Meiningen
- Spouse: Bernhard I, Duke of Saxe-Meiningen (m. 1671)
- Issue: Ernst Ludwig I Prince Bernhard; Prince Johann Ernst; Princess Marie Elisabeth; Prince Johann Georg; Frederick Wilhelm; Prince Georg Ernst
Names
- Marie Hedwig of Hesse-Darmstadt
- House: Hesse-Darmstadt
- Father: George II, Landgrave of Hesse-Darmstadt
- Mother: Sophia Eleonore of Saxony

Marie Hedwig of Hesse-Darmstadt (26 November 1647 in Giessen – 19 April 1680 in Ichtershausen) was a landgravine of Hesse-Darmstadt by birth and a Duchess of Saxe-Meiningen by marriage.

== Life ==
She was the youngest daughter of Landgrave George II of Hesse-Darmstadt and his wife Sophia Eleonore, a daughter of Elector John George I of Saxony.

On 20 November 1671 at Friedenstein Castle in Gotha, she married Bernhard I, who at the time ruled Saxe-Gotha jointly with his brothers and later became the first Duke of Saxe-Meiningen. In 1676, the couple took up residence in Ichtershausen. Bernhard built a castle here, which he named Marienburg after Marie Hedwig.

In 1680, Bernhard I and his brothers divided Saxe-Gotha, and Bernhard became the first Duke of Saxe-Meiningen. His newly created duchy consisted of the former principality of Henneberg. The coat of arms of Henneberg showed a black hen. At the time, this was seen as a symbol of magic and witchcraft. Shortly before the scheduled move from their residence in Ichtershausen to Meiningen, Marie Hedwig stated that she would never enter the land of the black hen. She died later that year after giving birth to her seventh child and was buried in the crypt of the city church in Meiningen. She was only 32 years old and died nine weeks before the scheduled move to Meiningen.

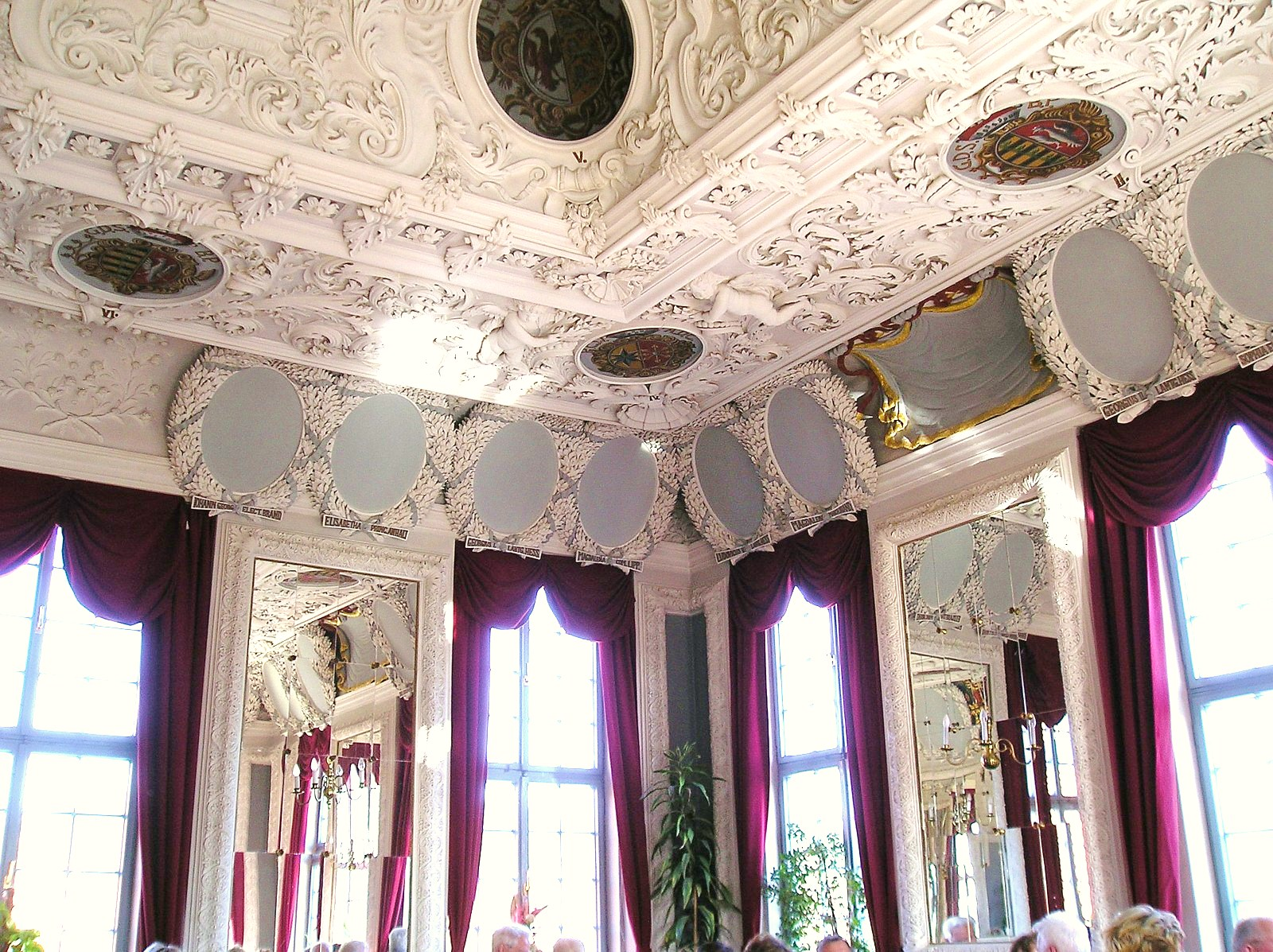
The Hesse hall in Elisabethenburg Palace

Bernhard I decorated the Hesse hall in Elisabethenburg Palace in Meiningen in a baroque style in her memory, and hung portraits of the two dynasties in this hall.

== Issue ==
Marie Hedwig was constantly pregnant during her marriage, giving birth almost once a year. Of her seven children, only two lived to maturity:

1. Ernest Louis (7 October 1672 in Gotha – 24 November 1724 in Meiningen)
2. Bernhard (28 October 1673 in Gotha – 25 October 1694 in Brussels), died in adolescence
3. John Ernest (29 December 1674 in Gotha – 8 February 1675 in Gotha), died in infancy
4. Marie Elisabeth (11 August 1676 in Ichtershausen – 22 December 1676 in Ichtershausen), died in infancy
5. John George (3 October 1677 in Ichtershausen – 10 October 1678 in Ichtershausen), died in infancy
6. Frederick Wilhelm (16 February 1679 in Ichtershausen – 10 March 1746 in Meiningen).
7. George Ernest (26 March 1680 in Ichtershausen – 1 January 1699 in Meiningen), died in adolescence of smallpox
