= Friedenstein Palace =

- Schloss Friedenstein
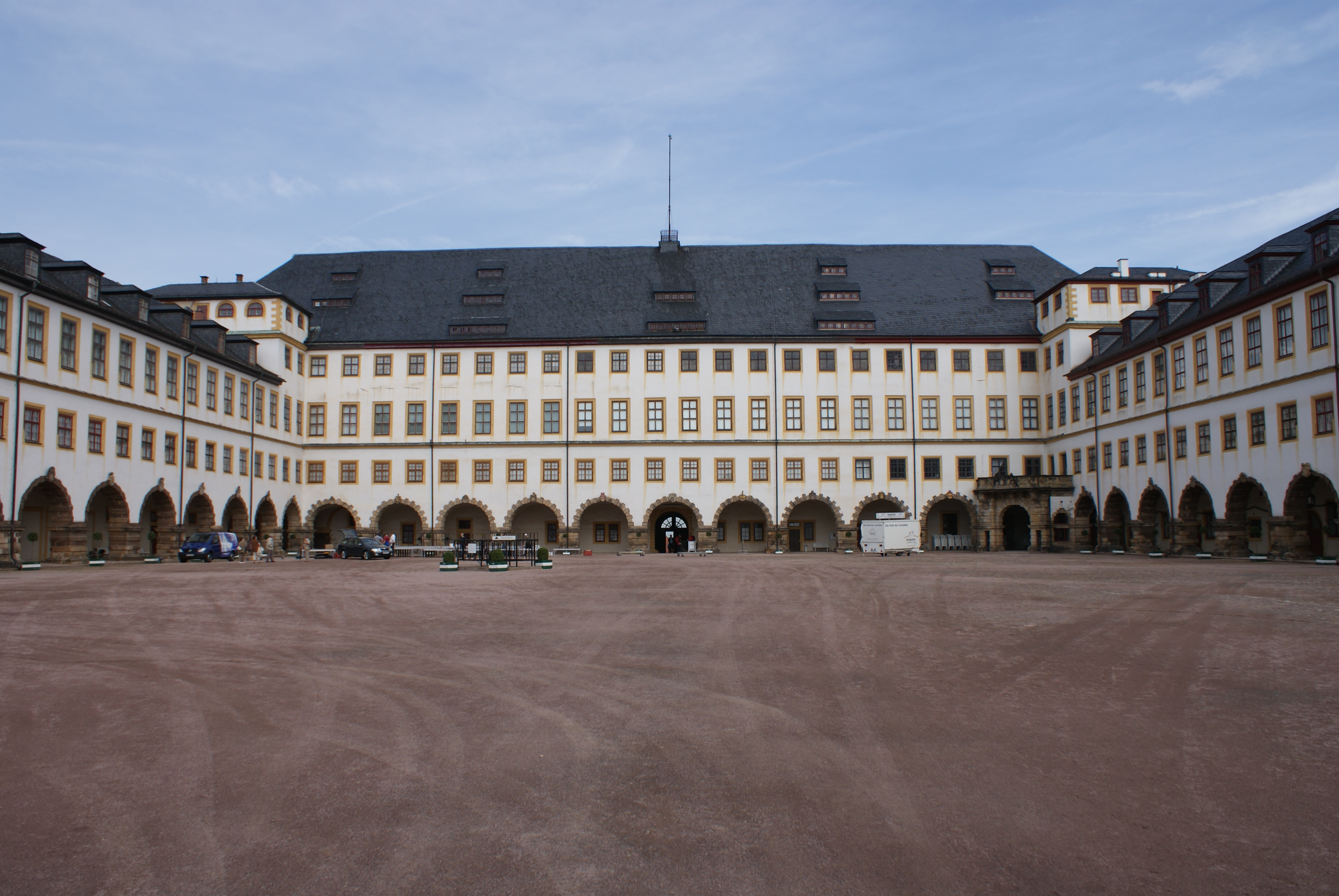
- View from the courtyard towards the north wing

- Location within Thuringia Location within Germany

General information
- Type: Palace
- Architectural style: Early Baroque
- Location: Gotha, Germany
- Coordinates: 50°56′45″N 10°42′16″E
- Construction started: 1643
- Completed: 1656 (initial work)
- Client: Herzog Ernst I von Sachsen-Gotha (Ernest I of Saxe-Gotha)
- Owner: Stiftung Thüringer Schlösser und Gärten

Design and construction
- Architect: Casper Vogell
- Structural engineer: Andreas Rudolph

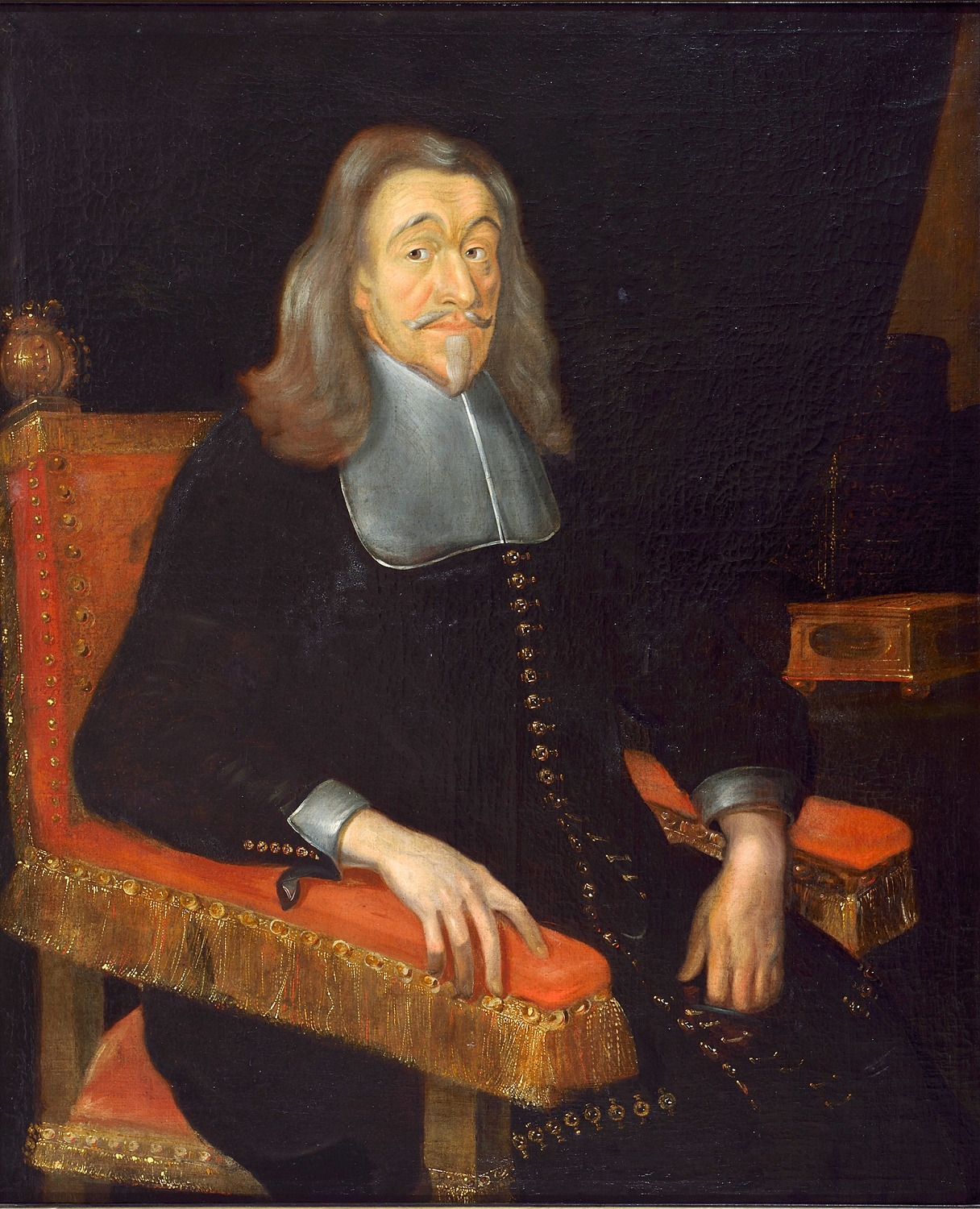
Ernest I, Duke of Saxe-Gotha (1601–1675)

Friedenstein Palace (German: Schloss Friedenstein) is an early Baroque palace in the city of Gotha, built in the mid-17th century by Ernest I, Duke of Saxe-Gotha at Gotha, Thuringia, Germany. In Germany, Friedenstein was one of the largest palaces of its time and one of the first Baroque palaces ever built. Friedenstein served as the main seat of the Dukes of Saxe-Gotha and later as one of the residences of the Dukes of Saxe-Coburg and Gotha, closely linked with the royal family of Great Britain through the marriage of Queen Victoria and Prince Albert. The final two ruling Dukes were both princes of the United Kingdom.

The palace complex today houses several museums. It is also notable for hosting the Ekhof-Theater, one of the oldest theatres in operation in Germany, still featuring the original Baroque machinery for changing the scenery.

== History ==
=== Earlier structures ===
The site where Friedenstein stands today, dominating the town of Gotha and its surroundings, was previously occupied by Grimmenstein Castle. It was first mentioned in 1316 and rebuilt in 1531-43 when it was also fortified in accordance with the changed requirements for a fortress in the age of gunpowder. In 1547, the Ernestine branch of the House of Wettin as members of the Protestant Schmalkaldic League had lost the Battle of Mühlberg against the Catholic forces of Emperor Charles V. As a result, Johann Friedrich I, Kurfürst von Sachsen (John Frederick I) was stripped of his title as "Elector of Saxony" (Kurwürde). Imperial forces blew up the fortifications of Grimmenstein but left the castle itself largely intact. It was rebuilt in 1552-54. However, in 1567 the fortress was almost completely razed as a result of the attempt of Johann Friedrich II (John Frederick II) to regain the Kurwürde by force of arms.

=== Construction ===
In 1640, Ernest I, Duke of Saxe-Gotha, also known as Ernst der Fromme ("Ernest the Pious"), first ruler of the newly created Duchy of Saxe-Gotha, settled on Gotha as the site for his Residenz. Gotha at the time was the largest town in the Duchy. In 1641/42 work began on the park, followed by construction of the palace itself in 1643. In naming the castle Friedenstein (literally "peace-rock"), Ernst made a point of drawing a clear line between this new palace and the warlike history of its predecessor. In addition, with the Thirty Years War still ongoing, the name also expressed a desire for peace after decades of warfare.

Based on plans by Casper Vogell (1600-1663), Andreas Rudolph (1601-1679) was in charge of building the castle. When it was finished in 1656, Friedenstein was the first ever Residenz in the Baroque style built on German soil that was completed during the lifetime of the ruler who ordered it. To justify the expense of such a vast structure, Ernest explicitly referred to the need to accommodate the administration for the new Duchy.

In July 1655, work began on fortifying the castle. By 1672, four bastions had been completed. The outer works were finished by 1687 and, beginning in 1663, the town of Gotha was also fortified. In 1672, the House of Saxe-Altenburg ended and most of the Duchy passed to Ernst, who now was ruler of Saxe-Gotha-Altenburg. Although the Duchy now had two Residenzen, Gotha was by far the more important one.

However, Ernst was unwilling to exclude any of his surviving sons from his heritage. So after his death in 1675, the Duchy was split in 1680/81 into seven separate territories: Saxe-Gotha-Altenburg, Saxe-Coburg, Saxe-Meiningen, Saxe-Römhild, Saxe-Eisenberg, Saxe-Hildburghausen and Saxe-Saalfeld. Ernst's oldest son, Friedrich I, became Duke of Saxe-Gotha-Altenburg, with his main Residenz at Gotha.

=== House of Saxe-Coburg ===
In 1826, after the death of the heirless Friedrich IV, the Duchy was split and Gotha passed to Ernst I of the House of Saxe-Coburg and father of Albert, Prince Consort who was to marry Queen Victoria. Ernst I now styled himself "Duke of Saxe-Coburg and Gotha", although he technically held the two separate Duchies of Saxe-Coburg and Gotha in personal union.

For the Dukes of Saxe-Coburg and Gotha, the latter was only a secondary residence, the focus was squarely on Coburg, where the Ehrenburg Palace was the main residence. Ernst II, successor of Ernst I and older brother of Albert, did not live in the castle when in Gotha, but at the Winterpalais in the town. During his long reign (died in 1893), the castle only housed the administration of the Duchy. Since Ernst II was without heir, he made his nephew, Alfred, the second son of Queen Victoria and Prince Albert, his heir. Alfred renounced his seat in the House of Lords and his annuity, and went to Germany.

In 1899, his only son Alfred reportedly shot himself during his parents' 25th wedding anniversary celebrations at Friedenstein. After being cared for in the castle for some days he was sent to a sanatorium near Meran, where he died on 6 February 1899. As Alfred's uncle, Prince Arthur, Duke of Connaught, and cousin, Prince Arthur of Connaught, both renounced their right of succession to the Duchy, the title passed to Charles Edward (Karl Eduard), the son of the Duke of Albany, fourth son of Victoria and Albert. Since Charles Edward was only 16 at the time, until his 21st birthday on 19 July 1905 a regency was installed. World War I caused a conflict of loyalties for Charles Edward/Karl Eduard, but he sided with Germany, leading the British government to strip him of his titles in the United Kingdom.

In November 1918, during the German Revolution Charles Edward was deposed by the local "Workers' and Soldiers' Council" and on 23 November he signed his abdication, thus ending the existence of the Duchy. The castle was now used as a museum.

=== After 1918 ===
During World War II an air raid shelter was constructed in the casemates of the castle. In 1944, part of the park and outbuildings were heavily damaged by Allied bombing.

After the end of the war, a significant part of the art treasures of the Friedenstein museums was transported to the Soviet Union as war reparations. However, most of it was restored in the late 1950s.

During the time of the German Democratic Republic (GDR), renovation work in the castle began in 1965 and many of the additions of the late 19th and early 20th century were removed from the interior.

In what became known as the Kunstraub von Gotha, on the night of 13-14 December 1979, five valuable paintings were stolen from the castle: Frans Hals' Brustbild eines jungen Mannes, Anthony van Dyck's Selbstbildnis mit Sonnenblume, Ferdinand Bol's Alter Mann, Jan Brueghel the Elder's Landstraße mit Bauernwagen und Kühen and Hans Holbein the Elder's Heilige Katharina. A special commission of the GDR police failed to solve the theft. It took no less than 40 years for the paintings to be recovered. The thief was Rudolf (Rudi) Bernhardt, who was born in Kassel and died in 2016. He was a train driver in East Germany and a victim of the Stasi.

In 2004, the castle and parks came into the care of the Stiftung Thüringer Schlösser und Gärten.

== Building history and architecture ==
=== Building history ===
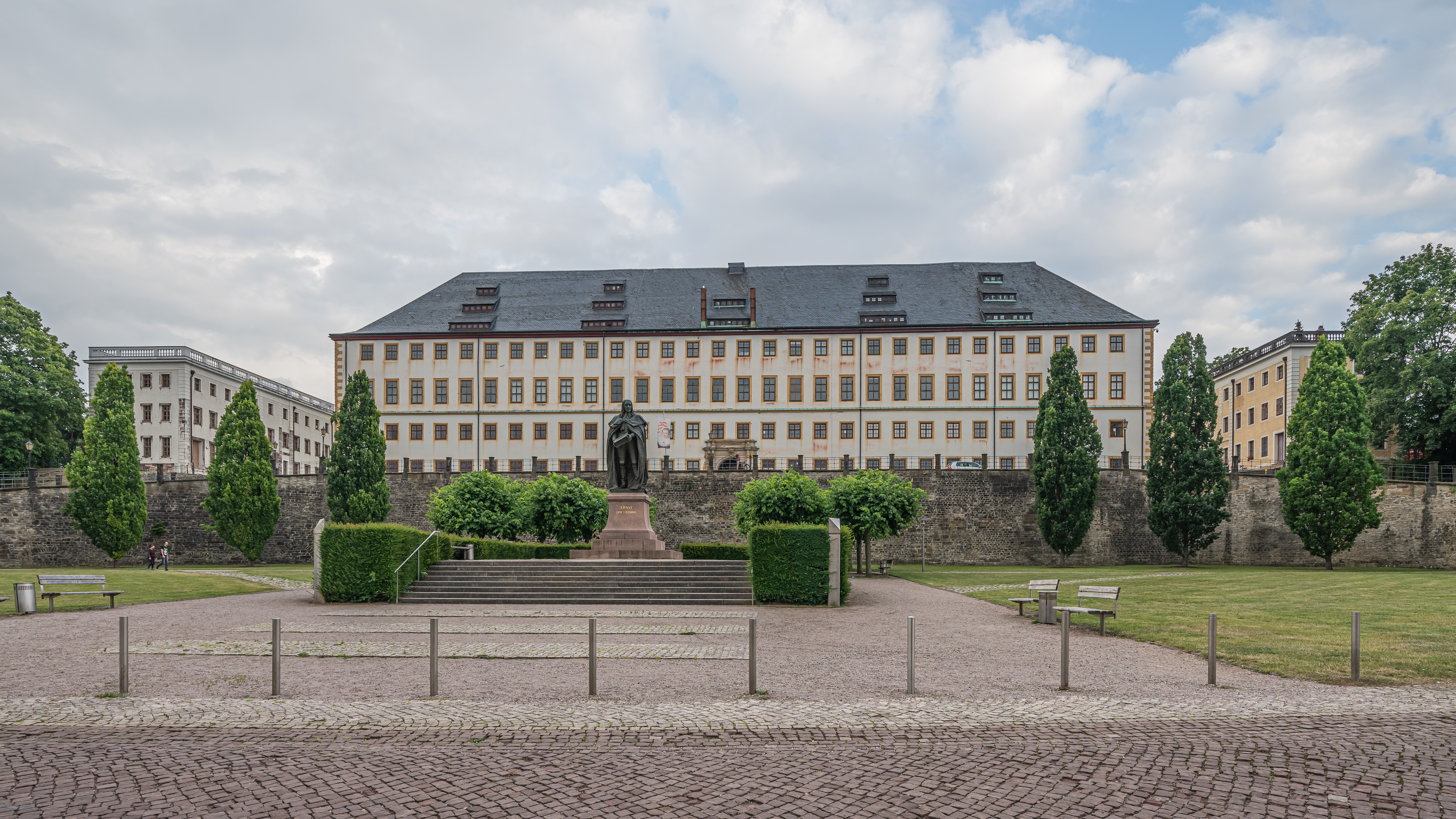
View of the main wing with the Pagenhaus from the north

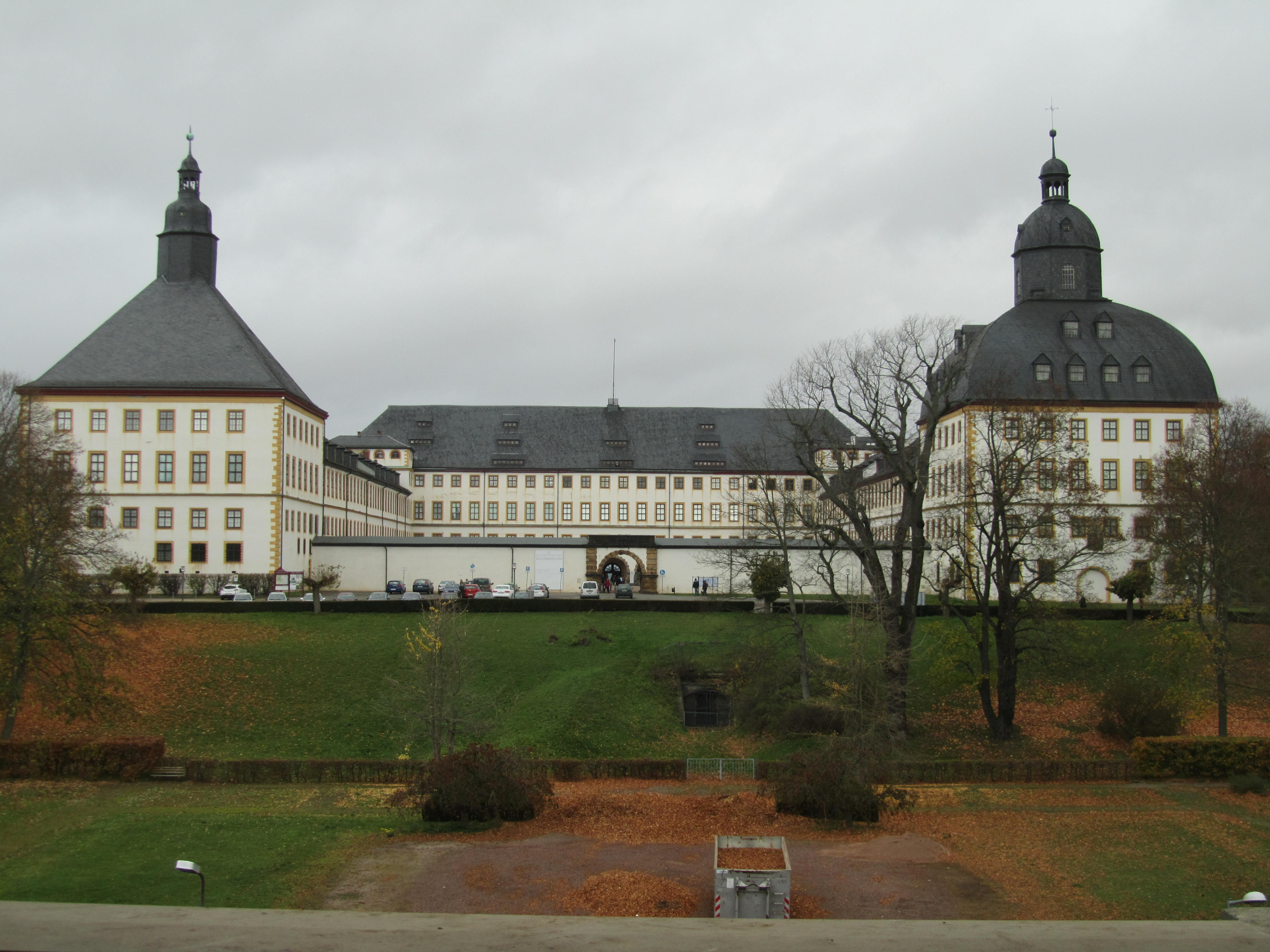
View from the south, with the west and east pavilion and the main wing visible in between

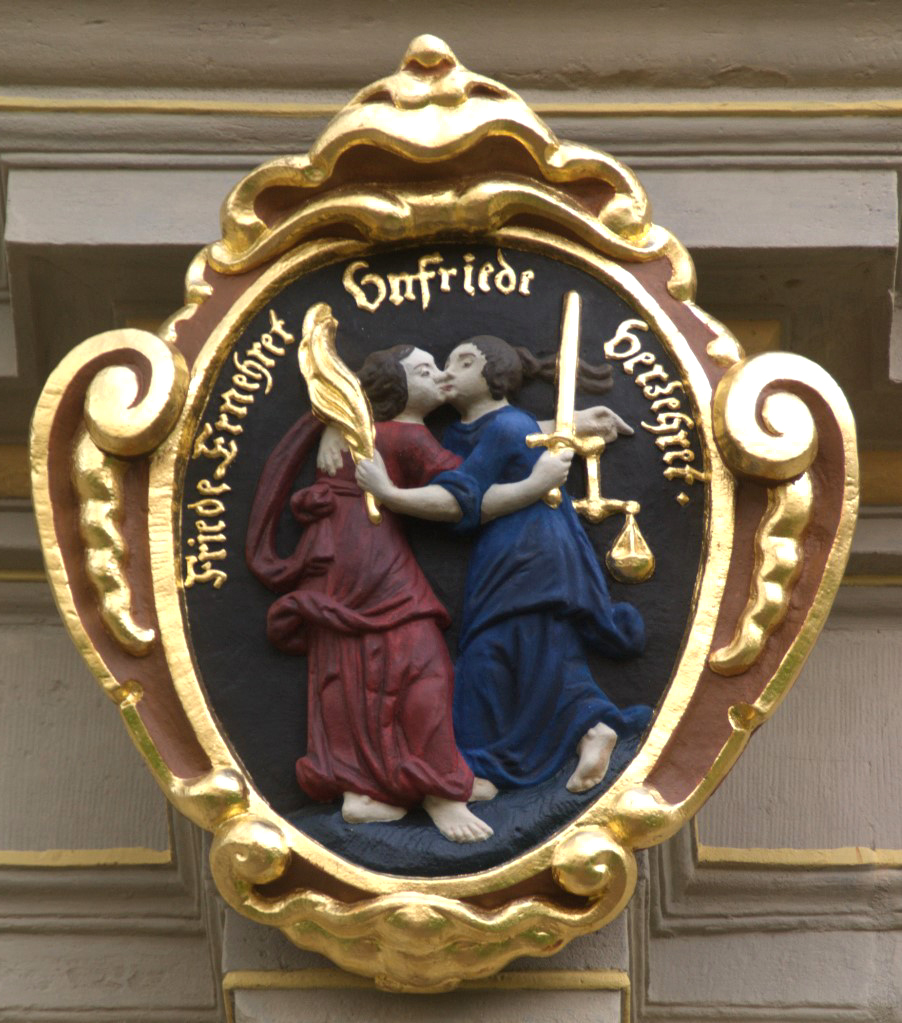
"Kiss of peace" above the main gate:Friede ernehret, Unfriede verzehret

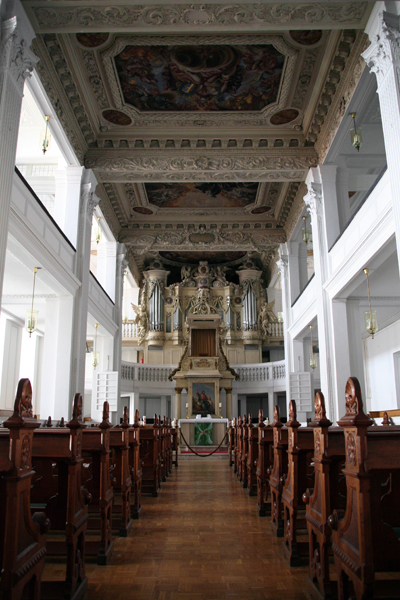
Palace chapel

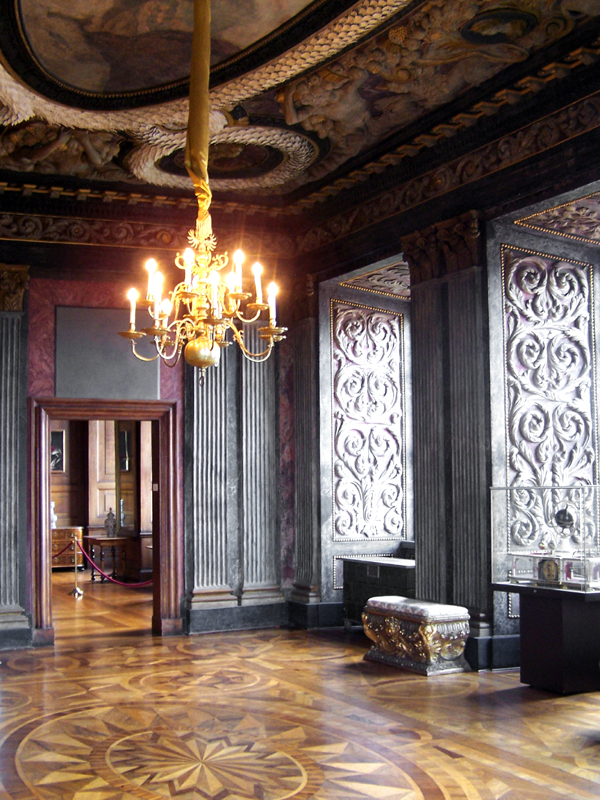
Audience hall

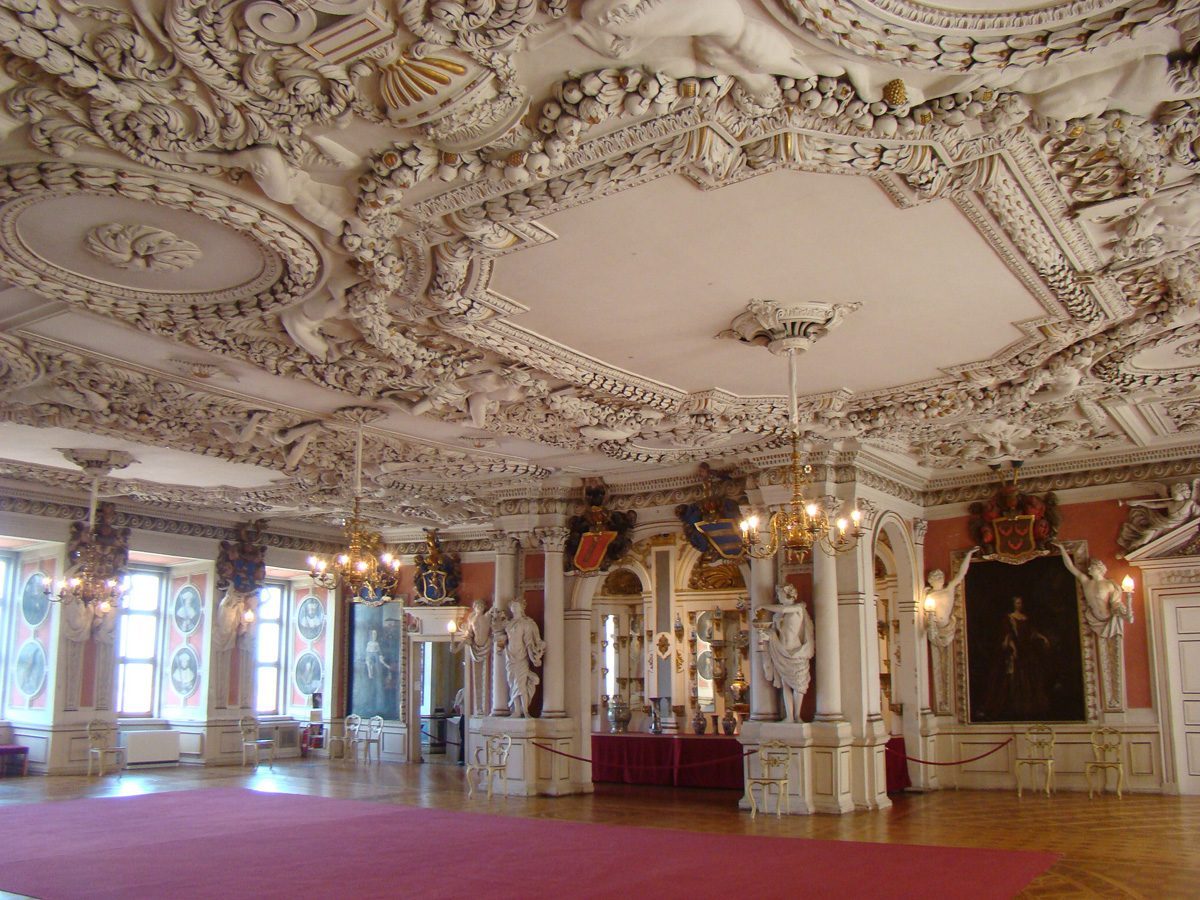
Hauptsaal (Great Hall, 1683/86)

The castle built for Ernst I was constructed according to general principles favoured by Protestant rulers in the 17th century. It took the form of a so-called "sub-ordinated" palace, meaning that the four wings are not on an equal footing but that there is one dominating main wing. At Friedenstein that is the four-story north wing, facing the town. The two side wings have three floors (but end in the four-story towers or pavilions) and the final wing had just one floor. Initially, all the state apartments were housed in the four-storied sections of the palace.

The palace dominates the town by its sheer size: the main wing is 100 metres long, the two side wings are 140 metres long. Although the interior of the palace has been significantly altered since the time of Ernst I, the exterior has remained largely unchanged. The simple, unadorned exterior was originally selected to contrast with the palaces of Catholic princes, which at the time were still mostly influenced by the elaborate Renaissance style. The only major embellishment at Friedenstein were four larger-than-life statues located at the four corners of the palace, showing Moses, Elijah, John the Baptist and Martin Luther. Other external features were a few reliefs salvaged from the old Grimmenstein and some decoration above the main gate to the courtyard, located in the centre of the north wing. The austere facades are structured not by ornamental features but only by the symmetrical arrangement of the windows and a cornice running around the whole building between the first and second floors. On the side facing the courtyard, an arcade was constructed running around all four wings of the palace. The major later change to the external appearance of the palace has been the addition of the two buildings on the left and right of the main wing facing the town, known as Pagenhaus and Wachthaus, added in 1778/79. At that time the four statues were also removed.

None of the original state rooms constructed for Ernst I remain today. The palace sections that have maintained their original use include the chapel and the Geheimes Archiv on the ground floor of the north wing. Otherwise the ground floor of all the wings housed servants' and storage rooms as well as an armoury, a stable, a mint and a smithy. The fourth wing contained a riding hall. The first upper floor of all the wings is slightly lower than the others – it used to house the offices of the Ducal administration. The second floor contained the main representatives areas reached by two staircases located at the juncture between the north and the side wings.

The palace interior was completely rearranged as early as the reign of Friedrich I, Ernst's son. In 1677, the east pavilion was struck by lightning and burned down. Fire walls helped to contain the fire to that part of the palace. It was realized that the Great Hall in the north wing, stretching over two floors and reaching above the chapel, prevented the addition of fire walls to the main wing. The hall was thus demolished and replaced by a new fire wall along with new state apartments: a suite of five rooms each for Duke and Duchess. These rooms were finished by around 1685. After that a new main hall, the Tafelgemach or Hauptsaal was added. After 1687, a crypt for the burial of the Ducal family was created beneath the chapel and the chapel itself rebuilt. In 1681/82, the former ballroom in the west pavilion was replaced by a theatre (see below). In 1684-87, the east pavilion was rebuilt and crowned with a rounded roof, distinguishing it from the west pavilion which retains its original roof shape. Friedrich III had the rooms of the Duchess renovated in 1747/51 and some years later, rooms for Friedrich III were added to the east pavilion. Friedrich's son Ernst II moved out of the Baroque state apartments in the main wing and into new rooms in the east wing, between the Mirror Hall and the east pavilion. Ernst II also had various other changes made to the palace and its surroundings, including tearing down some of the original gate buildings and ramparts and replacing the riding hall to the south with the simple wall now closing off the arcades of the south wing.

Starting in 1797, the former guest quarters in the west wing were redesigned and new ones added. Rooms were planned for heir apparent Emil August and his bride. Since work was not finished in time for the wedding, the Princess moved into the rooms in the northwest corner and Emil August into the unfinished west wing. After his wife died in 1801, Emil August had her rooms changed for his own needs. The bastions around the palace were removed around the year 1800 without ever having been used in defence.

Emil August's brother and successor, Friedrich IV did not live in the palace but in the town. His main contribution to the palace was bringing together the gallery of paintings from Friedenstein and other castles in the vicinity. This was located on the second floor of the west pavilion. Friedrich also created the Kunst- und Naturalienkabinett on the third floor of the north wing – the nucleus of the Ducal museums.

After the change in dynasties, the new Duke Ernst I von Sachsen-Coburg und Gotha had the rooms in the northwest corner redesigned. His son Ernst II, however, did not live in the palace but at the Winterpalais in the town. With Friedenstein not used as a residential palace, the focus shifted to its function as administrative centre of the Duchy. Various changes occurred during the long reign of Ernst II: Space for the museum became too tight, so it was decided in 1863 to construct a specialised building. This new museum was built in 1864-79 south of the palace. After a new theatre had been built in town in 1837-40, the Ekhof-Theater lost its function as the main stage. In 1847, new stables ( Marstall ) were built, freeing up space in Friedenstein itself. Finally, in 1860/61 the main state apartments were fundamentally redecorated to bring them in line with the tastes of the times.

The use of the palace changed again under Alfred. Despite the work done in the 1860s, the palace was not suitable for running a household in accordance with the demands of a ruling prince, lacking sufficient guest quarters for example. As a consequence, most of the Duchy’s administration was moved out of the palace and into the town. Substantial redecoration work was done to the state apartments at that time. The final round of redesigns occurred under Charles Edward after 1905. Many of the changes wrought by the final two princes were undone by renovation work after 1965, however.

=== Ekhof-Theater ===
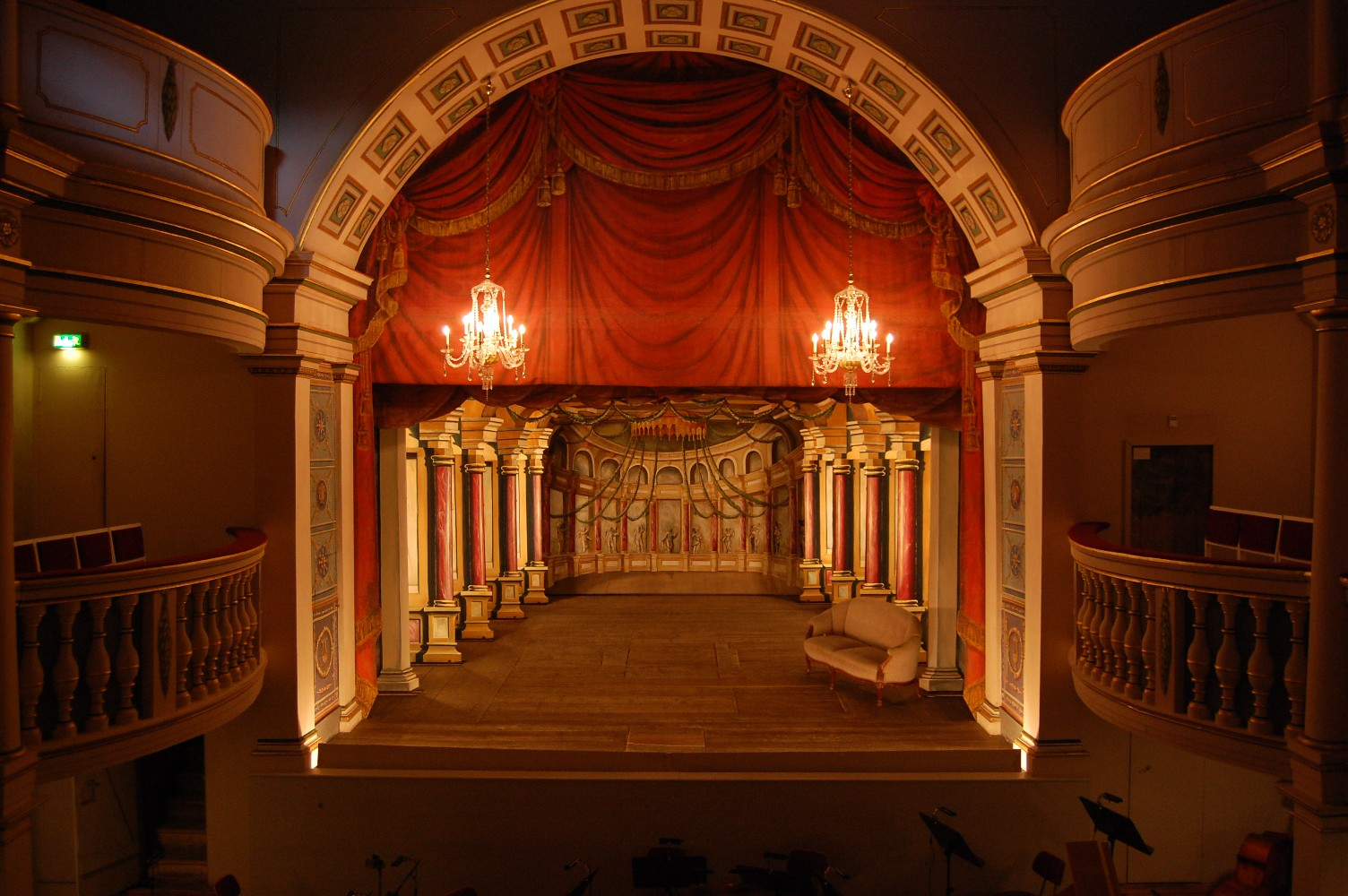
Stage of the Ekhof-Theatre

Located in the west pavilion, the Schlosstheater was built in 1681-87 by Caspar Lindemann and Hans Hoffmann. It is one of the oldest still operating theatres in Germany.

Today, the theatre is named after its best-known Direktor. In 1774, an actor group led by Conrad (or Konrad) Ekhof, called "the father of German acting", came from Weimar to Gotha. Ekhof began working at the Schlosstheater and became Direktor of the newly created "court theatre" while acting in many plays himself. Having turned it into one of the leading theatres in Germany, after his death in 1778 the fame of the theatre declined rapidly.

The current appearance of the theatre dates mostly to renovation in 1774/75, although the ceiling (looking like Coffer but actually printed on canvas) is still the original from the 1680s. In the 1770s, the balcony was extended and a second one added above. The theatre features a Baroque Kulissenbühne still in working condition, which makes it possible to change the scenery in view of the audience while the curtain is open. The mechanism was restored in the 1770s but is largely unchanged from 1683.

=== Parks ===
Friedenstein is surrounded by substantial gardens, developed individually but today linked into one park. The first garden was created even before the castle itself. The vegetable garden south of the castle was started in 1641/42. In 1645 and 1649, other gardens followed; the Hertzogin Lustgärtlein in the west and another Lustgarten to the east. Due to the existence of the massive fortifications around the castle, these first gardens were fairly small.

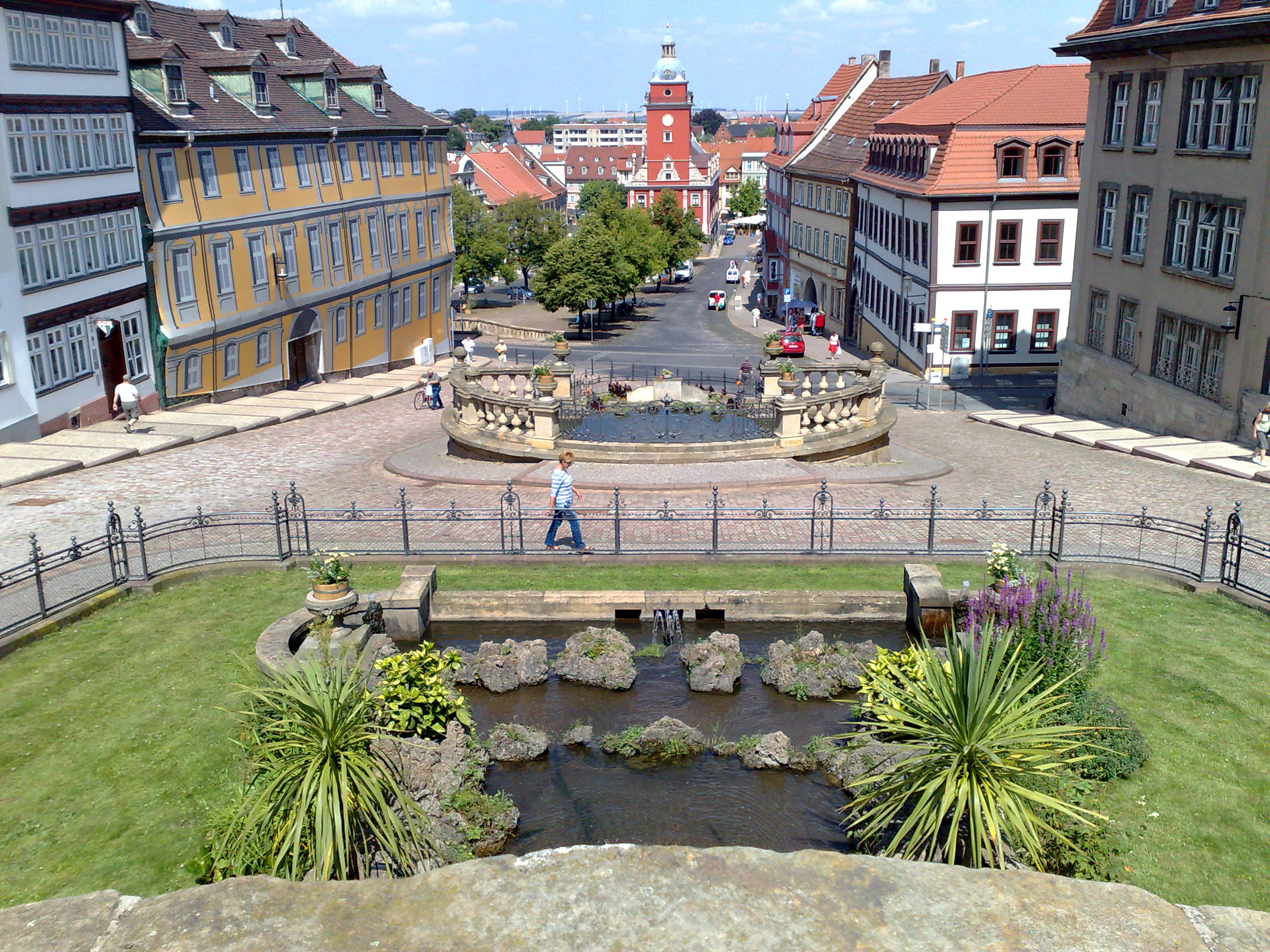
Wasserkunst

In 1707/08, a water feature (Wasserkunst) was added north of the castle on the slope towards the town. Around 1700, the western Lustgarten was redesigned in a Baroque style (this garden does not exist anymore today). More gardens were created east of the castle and in 1706 the eastern Lustgarten was also redesigned. From 1708 to 1711/14 the Friedrichsthaler Garten was created with a Lustschloss that eventually became the French Baroque style Schloss Friedrichsthal.

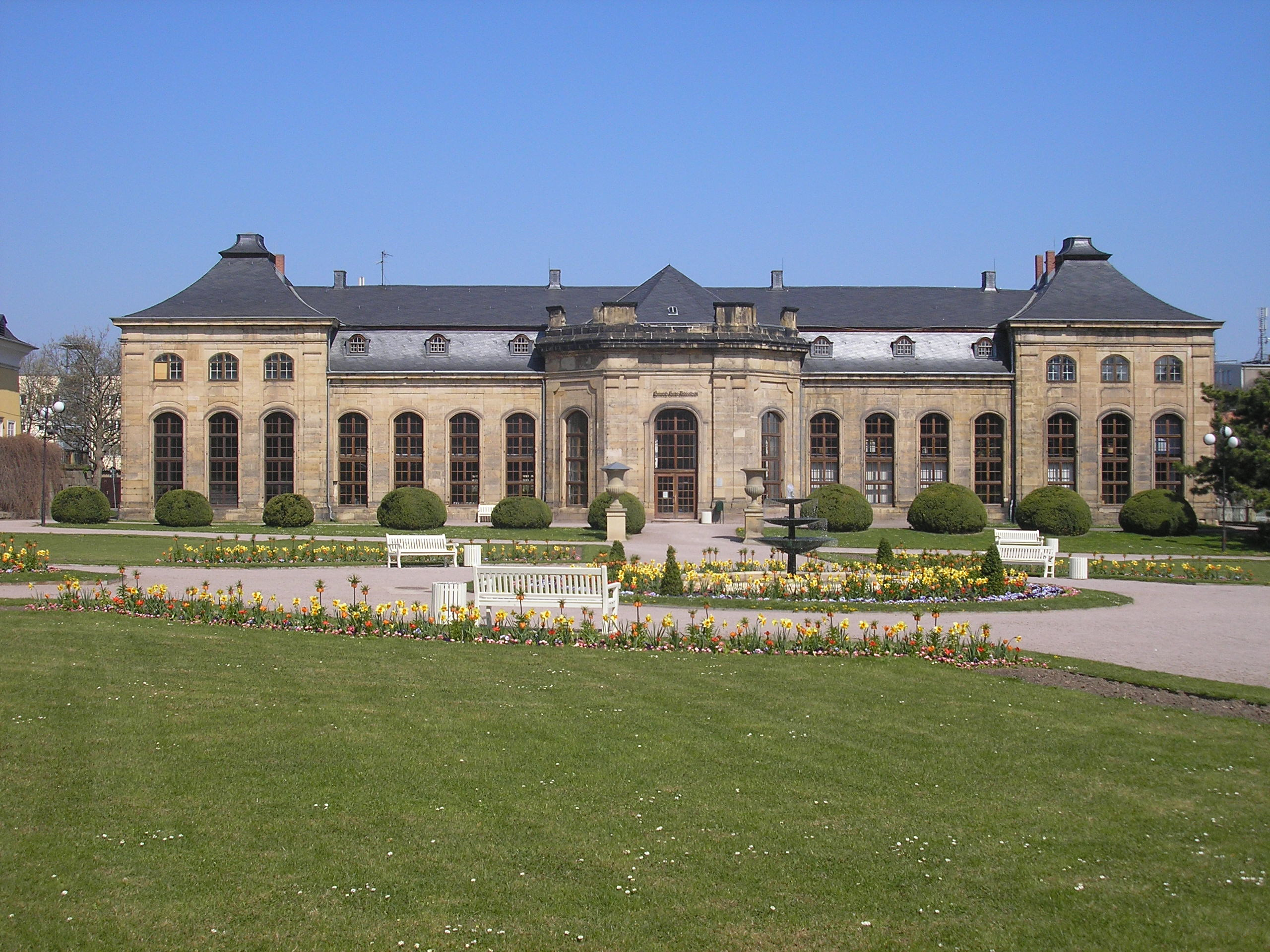
Orangerie (northern building)

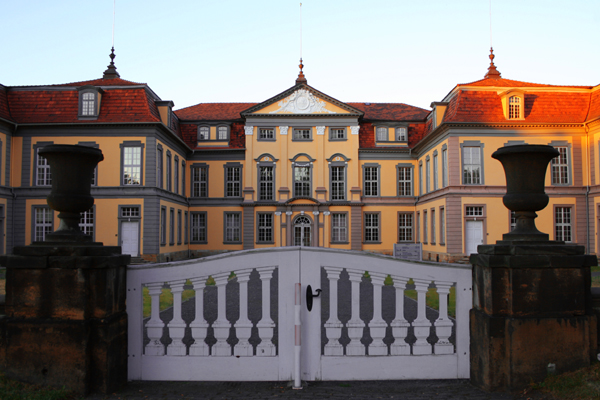
Schloss Friedrichsthal

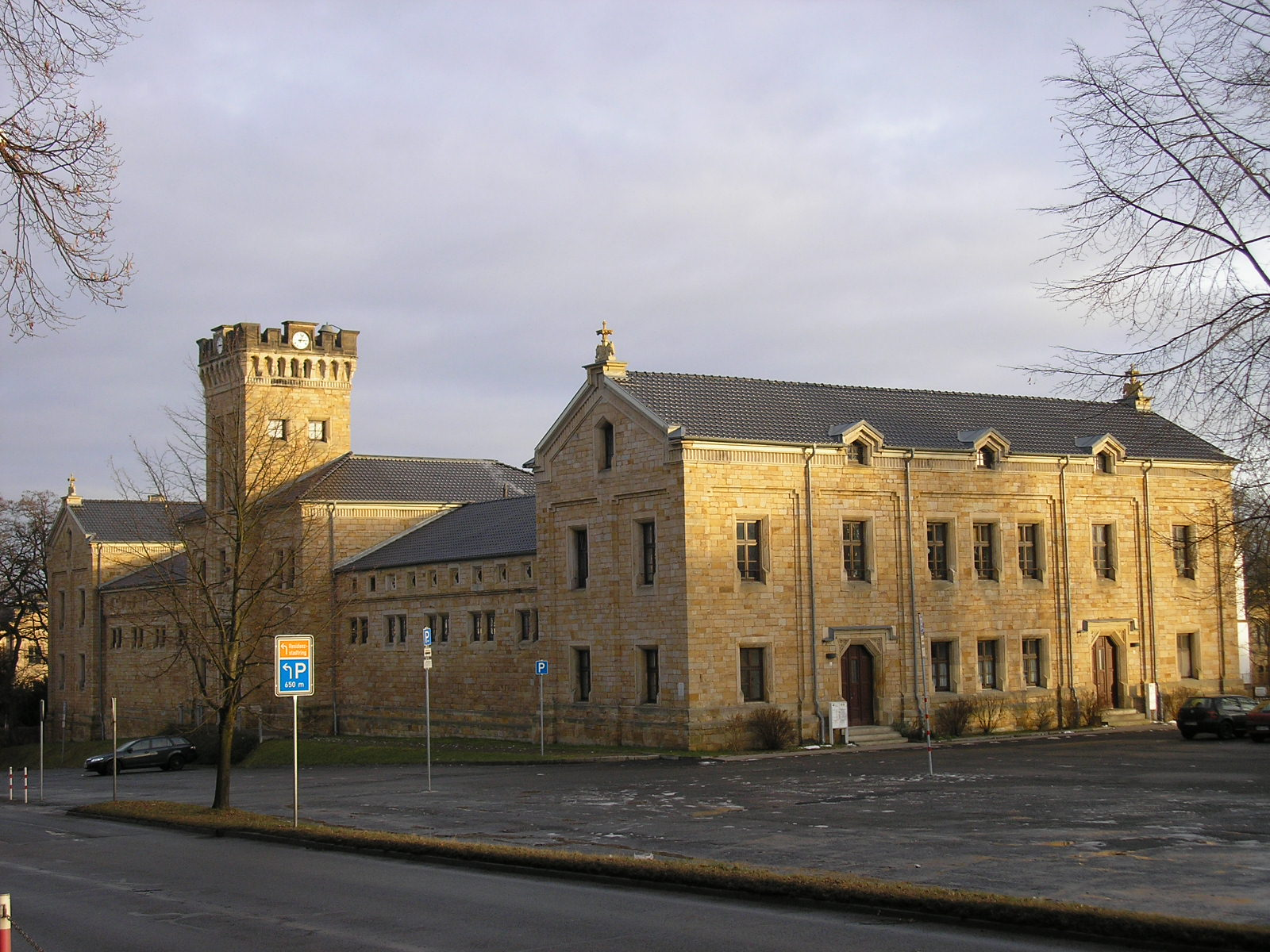
Marstall (stables)

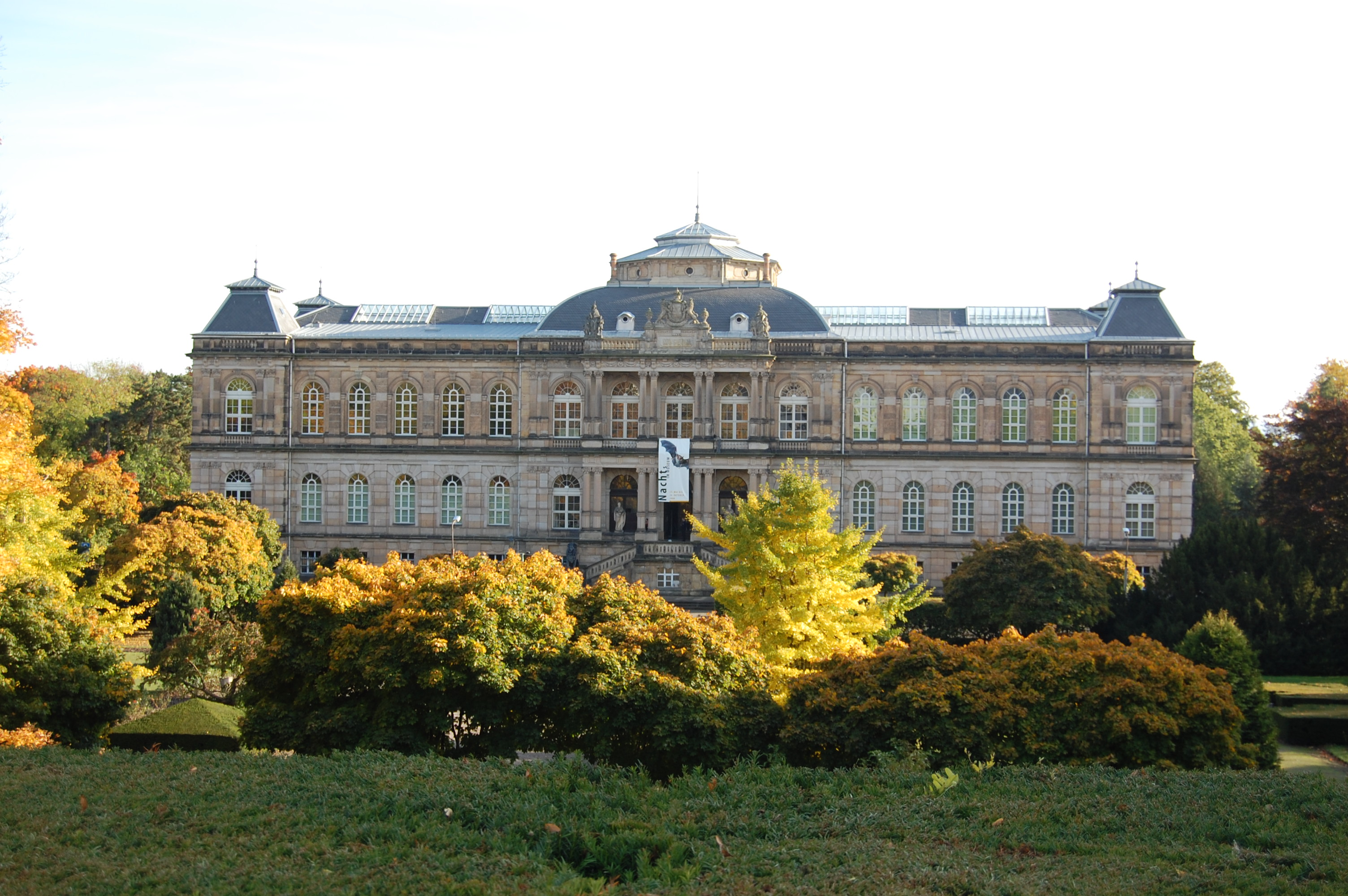
Ducal Museum – arthistorical museum of Gotha

The axis between Friedrichsthal and Friedenstein was turned into the Orangeriegarten between 1747 and 1774, designed by Gottfried Heinrich Krohne. This is the oldest part of the gardens still in existence today. By the time it was finished, however, this type of garden had become unfashionable.

After 1767, Ernst II combined the individual gardens into a single ensemble. The bastions were demolished and new sections added:

- The English landscape garden to the south is based on ideas of Lancelot Brown and was originally designed by John Haverfield. It is one of the oldest such parks in continental Europe, built after 1769.
- After 1779, the Herzoginnengarten was built, south of the Orangerie and in 1781 a Gothic Revival building was added (Teeschlösschen).
- Finally, the fortifications were replaced by the Herzögliche Anlagen.

In the 19th century, only minor alterations were made to the gardens. After the change in dynasties, the English garden was opened to the public in 1827. In the second half of the 19th century the last remaining formal gardens were replaced - the new museum building and the Tannengarten replaced the kitchen garden in 1869-82.

Major changes in the 20th century were limited to memorials and the areas immediately to the north and south of the castle proper. In 1904, the statue of Ernst der Fromme to the north was erected. This area between town and castle has since been restored in 1998, although it was previously occupied in turn by a fire pond, an air raid shelter and a parking area. South of the castle, a memorial to the dead of World War I was built in 1927 on the Reitplatz. In 1930, this area was part of the Deutsche Rosenschau. In 1947, the statue of the soldier was removed by the Soviet authorities and twenty years later replaced with a memorial to “the victims of fascism”. This memorial in turn was demolished in 2011.

== Today ==
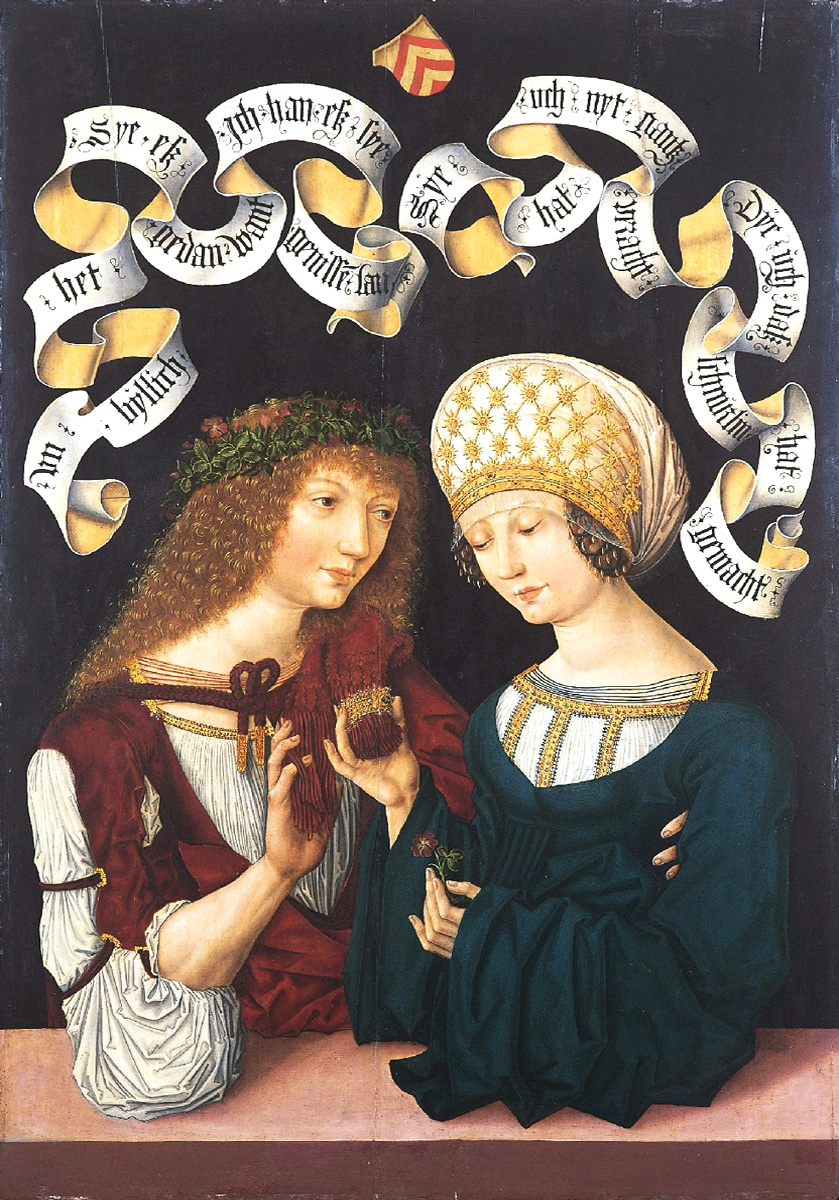
Gothaer Liebespaar, Gallery

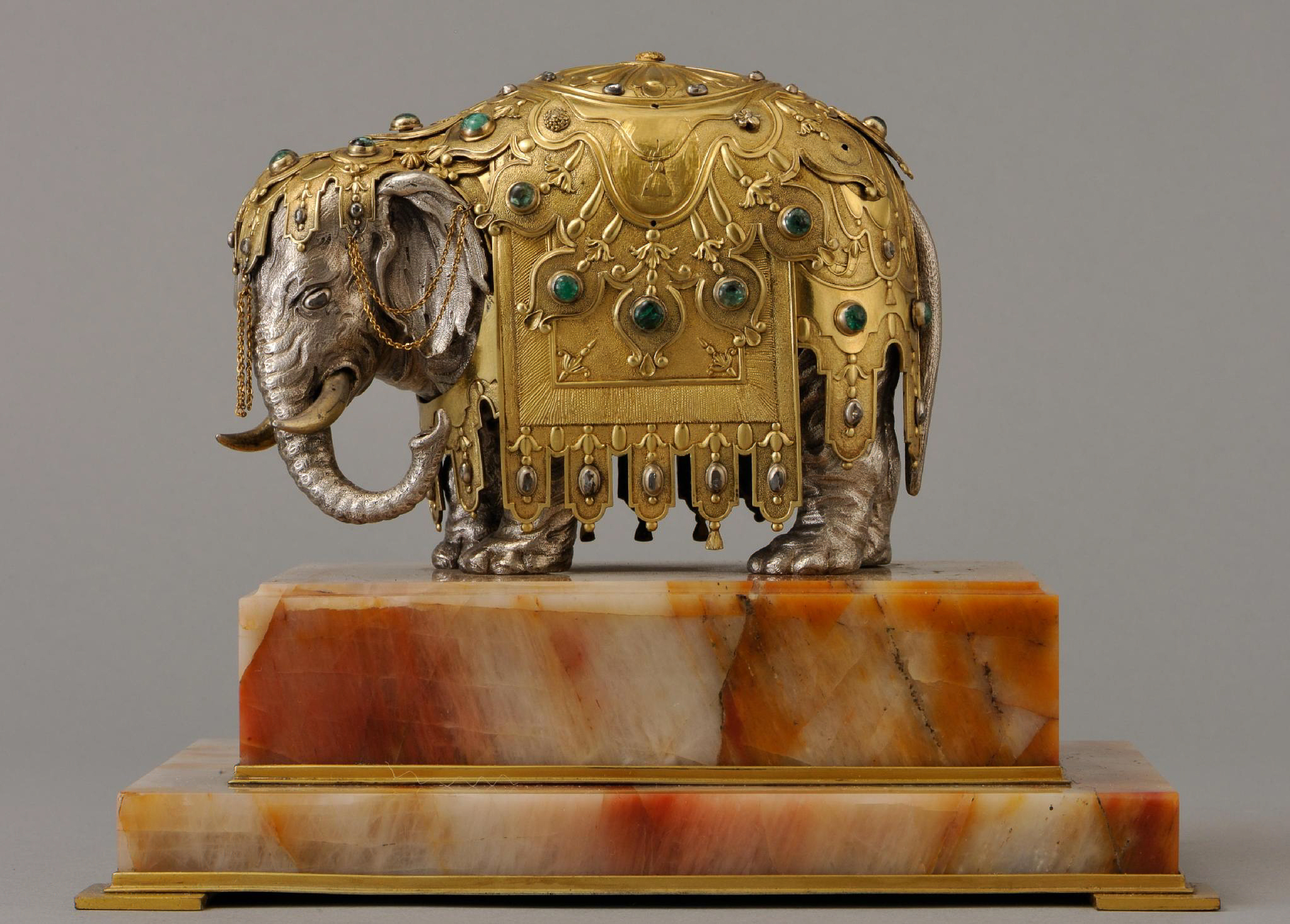
Gothaer Elephant (c. 1720), Schlossmuseum

The palace houses the Schlossmuseum (state apartments), Museum der Natur (natural history) and the "Historical Museum Gotha" in the north and west wing and the Forschungsbibliothek Gotha in the east wing. In 2014, the Thüringisches Staatsarchiv Gotha moved from its historical seat in the west wing to the closeby Perthesforum, a complex formerly used by the publishing company Perthes and nowadays serving various local cultural public institutes.

The Schlossmuseum currently combines the Baroque and neoclassical state apartments, the Ducal Kunstkammer, the Neue Münzkabinett (numismatic collection) and the Ekhof-Theater.

The gallery of paintings has been moved to the New Museum building outside the palace itself. This reorganisation is part of the general overhaul of the museums that began in 2010 under the label Barockes Universum Gotha ("Baroque universe Gotha"). Among the noteworthy paintings in the collection is Frans Hals's Portrait of a Man in a Wide-Brimmed Hat.
