= Princess Charlotte of Saxe-Meiningen =

Duchess consort of Saxe-Gotha-Altenburg from 1772 to 1804

Princess Charlotte
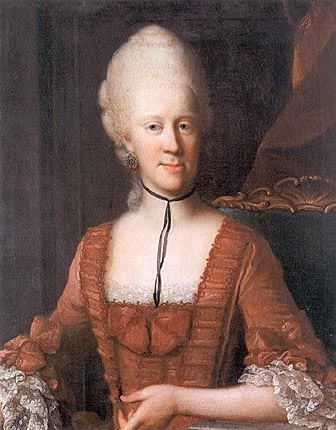
- Portrait by Johann Ernst Heinsius

Duchess consort of Saxe-Gotha-Altenburg
- Tenure: 10 March 1772 – 20 April 1804
- Born: 11 September 1751; Frankfurt am Main, Free Imperial City of Frankfurt, Holy Roman Empire
- Died: 25 April 1827 (aged 75); Genoa, Kingdom of Sardinia
- Spouse: Ernest II, Duke of Saxe-Gotha-Altenburg (m. 1769; died 1804)
- Issue: Ernest, Hereditary Prince of Saxe-Gotha-Altenburg; Augustus; Frederick IV; Prince Ludwig
Names
- German: Marie Charlotte Amalie Ernestine Wilhelmine Philippine
- House: Saxe-Meiningen
- Father: Anton Ulrich, Duke of Saxe-Meiningen
- Mother: Princess Charlotte Amalie of Hesse-Philippsthal

Princess Charlotte of Saxe-Meiningen (German: Marie Charlotte Amalie Ernestine Wilhelmine Philippine, Prinzessin von Sachsen-Meiningen) (11 September 1751, Frankfurt am Main, Free Imperial City of Frankfurt, Holy Roman Empire – 25 April 1827, Genoa, Kingdom of Sardinia) was a member of the House of Saxe-Meiningen and a Princess of Saxe-Meiningen by birth and a member of the House of Saxe-Gotha-Altenburg and Duchess consort of Saxe-Gotha-Altenburg through her marriage to Ernest II, Duke of Saxe-Gotha-Altenburg.

== Early life and family ==
Princess Charlotte was born on 11 September 1751. She was the eldest child and daughter of Anton Ulrich, Duke of Saxe-Meiningen and his second wife, Landgravine Charlotte Amalie of Hesse-Philippsthal. Charlotte was an elder sister of Charles William, Duke of Saxe-Meiningen and George I, Duke of Saxe-Meiningen.

== Marriage ==
Charlotte married Ernest, Hereditary Prince of Saxe-Gotha-Altenburg (later Duke of Saxe-Gotha-Altenburg), son of Frederick III, Duke of Saxe-Gotha-Altenburg and his wife Luise Dorothea of Saxe-Meiningen, on 21 March 1769 in Meiningen. Charlotte and Ernest had four children:

1. Ernest, Hereditary Prince of Saxe-Gotha-Altenburg (b. Gotha, 27 February 1770 – d. Gotha, 3 December 1779).
2. Augustus, Duke of Saxe-Gotha-Altenburg (b. Gotha, 23 November 1772 – d. Gotha, 27 May 1822)
3. Frederick IV, Duke of Saxe-Gotha-Altenburg (b. Gotha, 28 November 1774 – d. Gotha, 11 February 1825).
4. Prince Ludwig of Saxe-Gotha-Altenburg (b. Gotha, 21 October 1777 – d. Gotha, 26 October 1777).

Charlotte's husband, Ernest, was regarded as an enlightened monarch and a great patron of art and science, who led his country into a cultural flowering. He was assisted in his cultural undertakings by his wife, Charlotte.

Like her husband, Charlotte was a patron of astronomy. She counted relief panels for the court astronomer Franz Xaver von Zach and she also participated in observations. Charlotte also participated in the first European congress of astronomers in 1798 at the Seeberg Observatory and independently corresponded with the leading astronomers of her time.

== Later life ==
After her husband's death in 1804, there were difficulties with Charlotte's son, Augustus, upon his succession. Charlotte left Gotha with Zach and spent some time in Eisenberg. Later she traveled with Zach throughout southern Europe and lived several years in Marseille, and later in Genoa, where she died in 1827.

== Ancestry ==
Ancestors of Princess Charlotte of Saxe-Meiningen

8. Ernest I, Duke of Saxe-Gotha
4. Bernhard I, Duke of Saxe-Meiningen
9. Princess Elisabeth Sophie of Saxe-Altenburg
2. Anton Ulrich, Duke of Saxe-Meiningen
10. Anthony Ulrich, Duke of Brunswick-Wolfenbüttel
5. Duchess Elisabeth Eleonore of Brunswick-Wolfenbüttel
11. Duchess Elizabeth Juliana of Schleswig-Holstein-Sonderburg-Norburg
1. Princess Charlotte of Saxe-Meiningen
12. Philip, Landgrave of Hesse-Philippsthal
6. Charles I, Landgrave of Hesse-Philippsthal
13. Countess Catherine of Solms-Laubach
3. Landgravine Charlotte Amalie of Hesse-Philippsthal
14. John William III, Duke of Saxe-Eisenach
7. Princess Christine of Saxe-Eisenach
15. Christine Juliane of Baden-Durlach

Princess Charlotte of Saxe-Meiningen House of Saxe-Meiningen Cadet branch of the House of Wettin Born: 11 September 1751 Died: 25 April 1827
German nobility
Preceded by Luise Dorothea of Saxe-Meiningen	Duchess consort of Saxe-Gotha-Altenburg; 10 March 1772 – 20 April 1804	Succeeded by Karoline Amalie of Hesse-Kassel
