= Ernest II of Saxe-Gotha-Altenburg =

German duke (1745–1804)

Ernest II
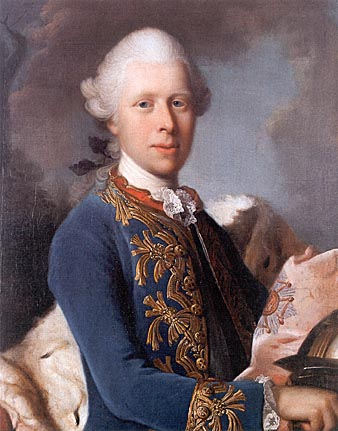
- Portrait by Johann Jonas Michael, c. 1775

Duke of Saxe-Gotha-Altenburg
- Reign: 10 March 1772 – 20 April 1804
- Predecessor: Frederick III
- Successor: Augustus
- Born: 30 January 1745; Gotha, Saxe-Gotha-Altenburg, Holy Roman Empire
- Died: 20 April 1804 (aged 59); Gotha, Saxe-Gotha-Altenburg, Holy Roman Empire
- Spouse: Princess Charlotte of Saxe-Meiningen (m. 1769)
- Issue: Ernest, Hereditary Prince of Saxe-Gotha-Altenburg; Augustus; Frederick IV; Prince Ludwig
- House: Saxe-Gotha-Altenburg
- Father: Frederick III, Duke of Saxe-Gotha-Altenburg
- Mother: Luise Dorothea of Saxe-Meiningen

Ernest II, Duke of Saxe-Gotha-Altenburg (Gotha, 30 January 1745 – Gotha, 20 April 1804) was the reigning Duke of Saxe-Gotha-Altenburg from 1772 to 1804. He was the third but second surviving son of Frederick III, Duke of Saxe-Gotha-Altenburg and Luise Dorothea of Saxe-Meiningen. The death of his older brother Frederick in 1756 made him the heir to the duchy of Saxe-Gotha-Altenburg.

== Early life ==
Luise Dorothea was intensely worried about the training of her surviving sons, Ernest and her youngest son August, and had them educated by a select group of teachers. In 1768 and 1769, both princes went on an educational journey to the Netherlands, England and France, and Ernest met important people in politics, science and the arts.

== Succession ==
In 1772, his father died, and Ernest inherited the duchy of Saxe-Gotha-Altenburg. As a liberal and enlightened prince, he was interested in the arts and sciences and used his reign to further them. He promoted the educational system, the economy, theatre, art collections and libraries as well as the natural sciences in his duchy, which was thereby ranked in the top place of the Saxon duchies in Thuringia. Privately, he was particularly interested in astronomy and physics. He appointed competent specialists in all of these areas like the mechanic and clockmaker Johann Andreas Klindworth to whom he granted the title of court mechanic.

For his special interests, he employed the services of the important astronomer Franz Xaver von Zach for Gotha. With him, he established the Observatory of Gotha (Sternwarte Gotha), which developed into a European centre of astronomy. His will stated that this institution should survive as the only visible indication of his existence. It was so successful that Gotha, despite its size, was thought of as a place that important people of the time should visit. One such person was Goethe, who visited several times.

Under the influence of the French Revolution, he wanted to abdicate and emigrate to Switzerland or the United States, for which purpose he had his court officials acquire land in the Montgomery area in Ohio and commissioned Joseph Ramée to design a country house in 1796. Ultimately, however, he remained in Gotha.

In 1790, Ernest was appointed knight of the Order of the Garter. Due to his aunt's marriage with Frederick, Prince of Wales, in 1736, he was a cousin of King George III. The formal investiture took place in April 1791 at Friedenstein Palace. After Ernest's death, the insignia were handed back to the order in 1804.

== Freemasonry ==
From 1774 he was a Freemason in the Zinnendorf system and a member of the Gotha Lodge Zum Rautenkranz, which had been founded by Abel Seyler, Konrad Ekhof and other members of the Seyler Theatre Company in the same year. In 1775, he was appointed Grand Master of the Landesloge of Germany (Zinnendorf system). In 1783, he became a member of the Bavarian Illuminati under the name of Quintus Severus and/or Timoleon, and in 1784, he was made Supervisor of Abessinien (a name for Upper Saxony). In 1787, he granted Adam Weishaupt, the founder of the secret society, asylum in Gotha. He was buried wrapped in a white cloth on the park island.

== Legends about Ernest ==
The duke, who was interested in science as well as Freemasonry and the Illuminati, was regarded by his subjects as a man with magical abilities. To this day, a legend has survived in Gotha according to which Ernst II was able to “banish” fire.

== Issue ==
In Meiningen on 21 March 1769, Ernest married Princess Charlotte of Saxe-Meiningen, the half-first cousin of his mother. They had four sons:

- Ernest (b. Gotha, 27 February 1770 – d. Gotha, 3 December 1779), Hereditary Prince of Saxe-Gotha-Altenburg, died in infancy.
- Emil Leopold August, Duke of Saxe-Gotha-Altenburg (b. Gotha, 23 November 1772 – d. Gotha, 27 May 1822), known as Augustus.
- Frederick IV, Duke of Saxe-Gotha-Altenburg (b. Gotha, 28 November 1774 – d. Gotha, 11 February 1825).
- Ludwig (b. Gotha, 21 October 1777 – d. Gotha, 26 October 1777), died in infancy.

== Ancestors ==
Ancestors of Ernest II of Saxe-Gotha-Altenburg

8. Frederick I, Duke of Saxe-Gotha-Altenburg
4. Frederick II, Duke of Saxe-Gotha-Altenburg
9. Magdalena Sibylla of Saxe-Weissenfels
2. Frederick III, Duke of Saxe-Gotha-Altenburg
10. Charles, Prince of Anhalt-Zerbst
5. Princess Magdalena Augusta of Anhalt-Zerbst
11. Sophia of Saxe-Weissenfels, Princess of Anhalt-Zerbst
1. Ernest II, Duke of Saxe-Gotha-Altenburg
12. Bernhard I, Duke of Saxe-Meiningen
6. Ernst Ludwig I, Duke of Saxe-Meiningen
13. Marie Hedwig of Hesse-Darmstadt
3. Princess Luise Dorothea of Saxe-Meiningen
14. Frederick I, Duke of Saxe-Gotha-Altenburg (= 8)
7. Dorothea Marie of Saxe-Gotha-Altenburg
15. Magdalena Sibylla of Saxe-Weissenfels (= 9)

Ernest II of Saxe-Gotha-Altenburg House of Wettin Born: 30 January 1745 Died: 20 April 1804
Regnal titles
Preceded by Frederick III	Duke of Saxe-Gotha-Altenburg; 1772–1804	Succeeded by Augustus
