= A Year in Arcadia: Kyllenion =

Book by August van Saksen-Gotha-Altenburg

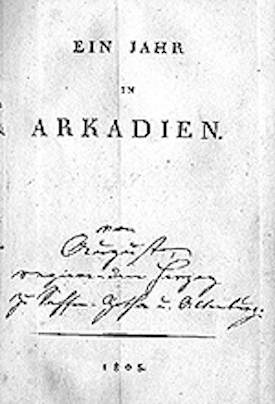
- Author: Augustus, Duke of Saxe-Gotha-Altenburg
- Original title: Ein Jahr in Arkadien: Kyllenion
- Language: German
- Genre: Novel
- Publisher: Frommann and Wesselhöft
- Publication date: 1805
- Publication place: Germany
- Media type: Print
- Pages: 124

A Year in Arcadia: Kyllenion (German: Ein Jahr in Arkadien: Kyllenion) is an 1805 novel by Augustus, Duke of Saxe-Gotha-Altenburg. It is notable as "the earliest known novel that centers on an explicitly male–male love affair".

== Overview ==
A Year in Arcadia is structured as a set of idylls, one for each month of the Attic calendar. Set in ancient Greece, it features several couples—including a homosexual one—falling in love, overcoming obstacles and living happily ever after. The Romantic movement gaining momentum at the end of the 18th century allowed men to "express deep affection for each other", and the motif of ancient Greece as "a utopia of male–male love" was an acceptable vehicle to reflect this, but some of Duke August's contemporaries felt that his characters "stepped over the bounds of manly affection into unseemly eroticism."

The Frankfurt University Library at Goethe University Frankfurt has an original copy of Ein Jahr in Arkadien in its Library of Arthur Schopenhauer Collection. The volume is 124 pages, with ΚΥΛΛΗΝΙΩΝ in Greek script facing the title page, and front and rear illustrations. The book was translated into English and Portuguese languages.
