= Frederick IV of Saxe-Gotha-Altenburg =

German duke (1774–1825)

Frederick IV
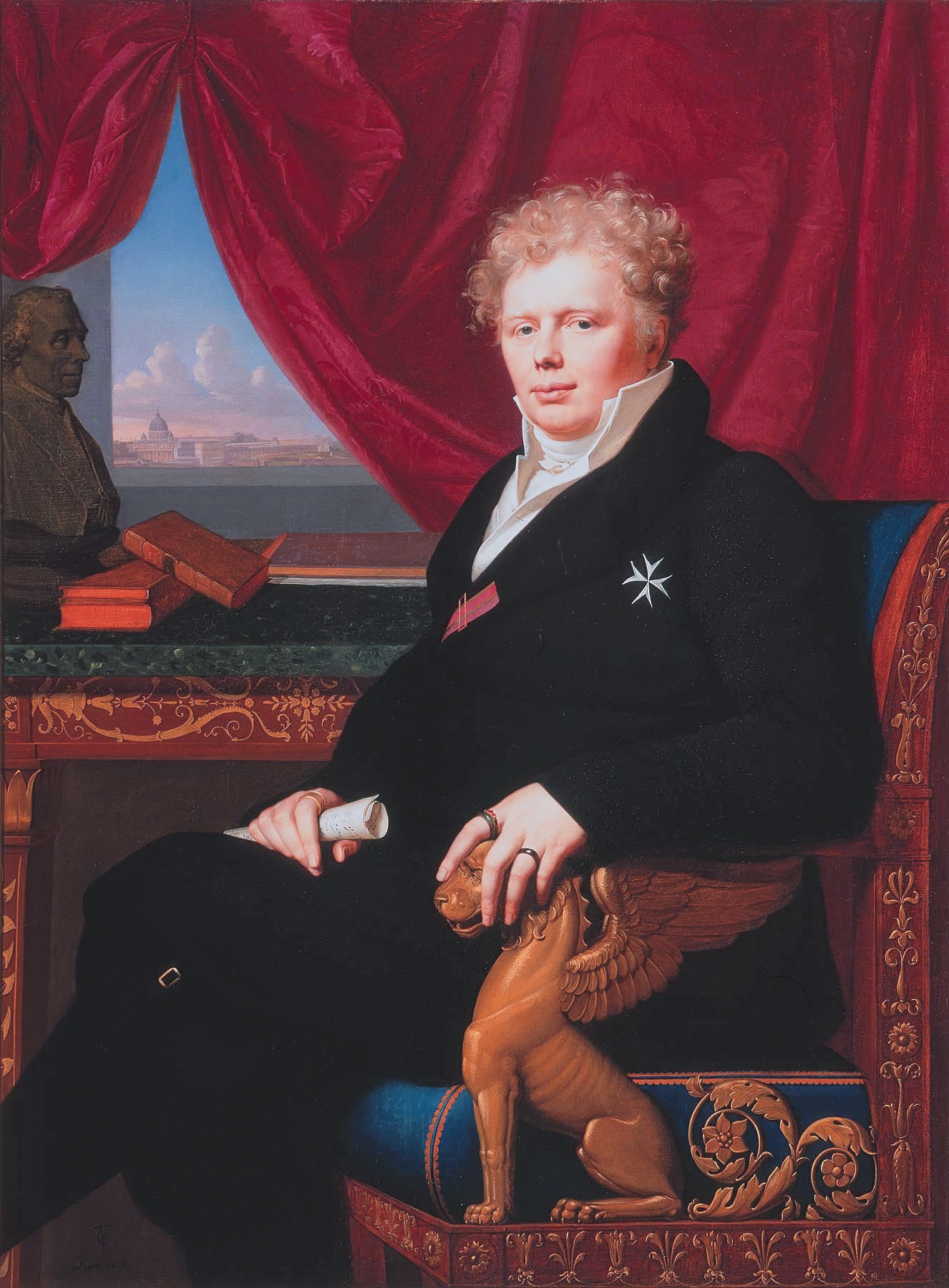
- Portrait by Carl Christian Vogel von Vogelstein

Duke of Saxe-Gotha-Altenburg
- Reign: 17 May 1822 - 11 February 1825
- Predecessor: Augustus
- Successor: Dissolution; Ernst III of Saxe-Coburg-Gotha; Frederick of Saxe-Altenburg
- Born: 28 November 1774; Gotha
- Died: 11 February 1825 (aged 50); Gotha
- House: House of Saxe-Gotha-Altenburg
- Father: Ernst II, Duke of Saxe-Gotha-Altenburg
- Mother: Princess Charlotte of Saxe-Meiningen

Frederick IV, Duke of Saxe-Gotha-Altenburg (Gotha, 28 November 1774 – Gotha, 11 February 1825), was the last duke of Saxe-Gotha-Altenburg.

He was the third but second surviving son of Ernst II, Duke of Saxe-Gotha-Altenburg and Charlotte de Saxe-Meiningen.

After the death of his older brother August without sons (1822), Frederick (the only surviving male of the house) inherited the duchy of Saxe-Gotha-Altenburg.

Frederick fought - after military training - in the Napoleonic campaigns and was heavily wounded. As a consequence of these injuries, he was constantly ill until his death. Because of his illness, he traveled for a long time seeking a cure. During these stays outside of his duchy, he left the government in hands of his secret advisor Bernhard August von Lindenau.

He only reigned three years and died unmarried; with him, the line of Saxe-Gotha-Altenburg ended. After his death, his lands were repartitioned among his Wettin relations. Ernst I of Saxe-Coburg-Saalfeld received Gotha, and changed his title to Duke of Saxe-Coburg and Gotha, although the two duchies remained technically separate in a personal union. Altenburg was thereafter ruled by the Duke of Saxe-Hildburghausen, whose dukedom was transferred to Saxe-Meiningen along with Saxe-Saalfeld, which Saxe-Coburg gave up in return for receiving Saxe-Gotha.

== Ancestors ==
Ancestors of Frederick IV of Saxe-Gotha-Altenburg

8. Frederick II, Duke of Saxe-Gotha-Altenburg
4. Frederick III, Duke of Saxe-Gotha-Altenburg
9. Magdalena Augusta of Anhalt-Zerbst
2. Ernest II, Duke of Saxe-Gotha-Altenburg
10. Ernst Ludwig I, Duke of Saxe-Meiningen
5. Princess Luise Dorothea of Saxe-Meiningen
11. Dorothea Marie of Saxe-Gotha-Altenburg
1. Frederick IV, Duke of Saxe-Gotha-Altenburg
12. Bernhard I, Duke of Saxe-Meiningen
6. Anton Ulrich, Duke of Saxe-Meiningen
13. Elisabeth Eleonore of Brunswick-Wolfenbüttel
3. Princess Charlotte of Saxe-Meiningen
14. Charles I, Landgrave of Hesse-Philippsthal
7. Charlotte Amalie of Hesse-Philippsthal
15. Caroline Christine of Saxe-Eisenach

Frederick IV of Saxe-Gotha-Altenburg House of Wettin Born: 28 November 1774 Died: 11 February 1825
Preceded by Emil Leopold August	Duke of Saxe-Gotha-Altenburg; 1822–1825	Succeeded by Ernst I as Duke of Saxe-Gotha
Preceded by Emil Leopold August	Duke of Saxe-Gotha-Altenburg; 1822–1825	Succeeded by Frederick as Duke of Saxe-Altenburg
