= Augustus, Duke of Saxe-Gotha-Altenburg =

German duke (1772–1822)

Augustus
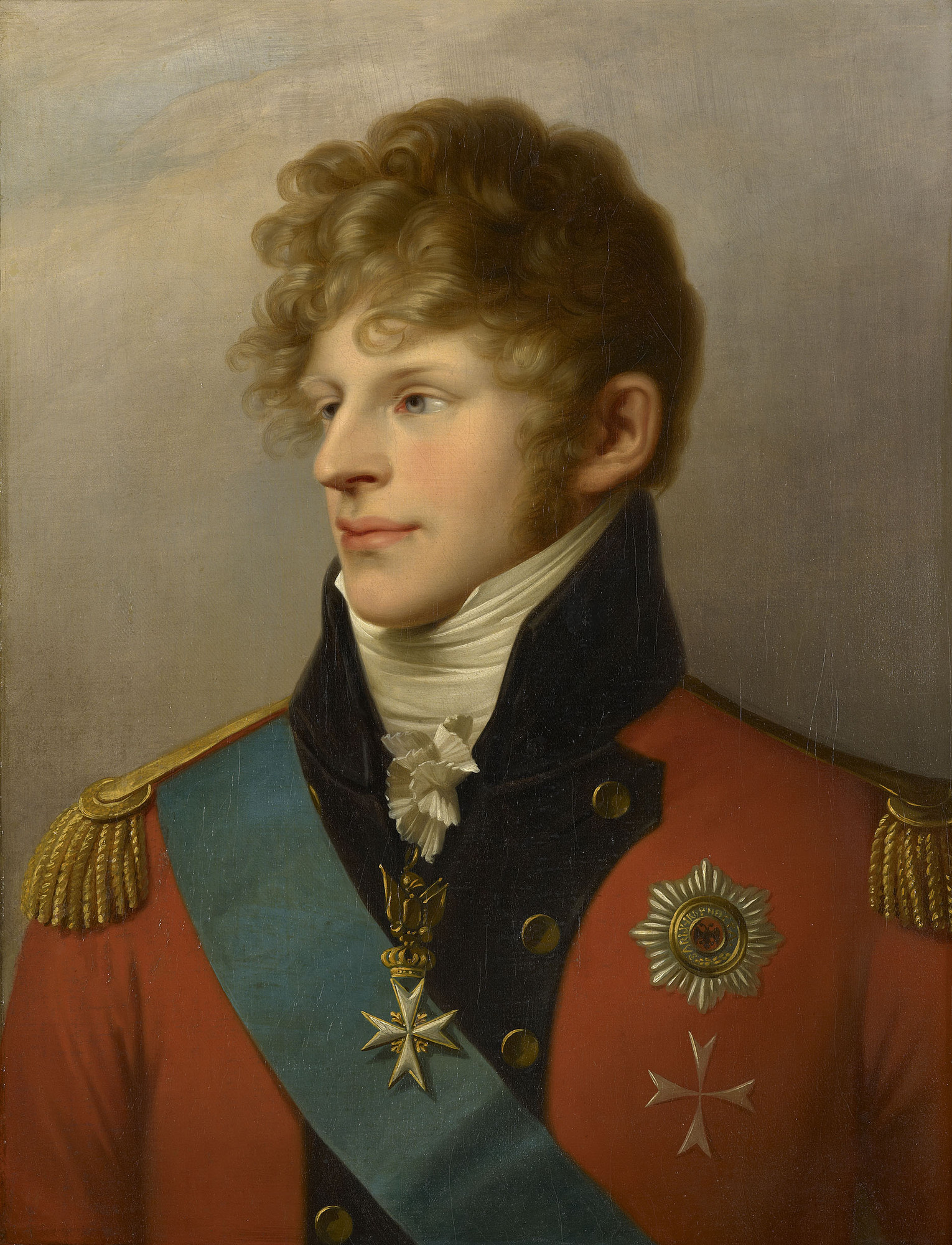
- Portrait by Ludwig Döll (1807)

Duke of Saxe-Gotha-Altenburg
- Reign: 20 April 1804 – 17 May 1822
- Predecessor: Ernst II
- Successor: Frederick IV
- Born: 23 November 1772; Gotha, Saxe-Gotha-Altenburg, Holy Roman Empire
- Died: 17 May 1822 (aged 49); Gotha, Saxe-Gotha-Altenburg, German Confederation
- Burial: Friedenstein Castle
- Spouse: Duchess Louise Charlotte of Mecklenburg-Schwerin (m. 1797; died 1801) Princess Karoline Amalie of Hesse-Kassel (m. 1802)
- Issue: Louise, Duchess of Saxe-Coburg-Gotha
Names
- Emil Leopold August
- House: Saxe-Gotha-Altenburg
- Father: Ernst II, Duke of Saxe-Gotha-Altenburg
- Mother: Charlotte of Saxe-Meiningen
- Religion: Lutheranism

Augustus, Duke of Saxe-Gotha-Altenburg (full name: Emil Leopold August) (23 November 1772 — 17 May 1822), was a Duke of Saxe-Gotha-Altenburg, and the author of one of the first modern novels to treat of homoerotic love. He was the maternal grandfather of Prince Albert, consort of Queen Victoria.

== Early life ==
Augustus was born on 23 November 1772 in Gotha, the second son of Ernst II, Duke of Saxe-Gotha-Altenburg and Princess Charlotte of Saxe-Meiningen. In 1779, the death of his older brother Ernst made him heir to the duchy of Saxe-Gotha-Altenburg. In his youth he was very well educated, and his environment—sympathetic to the Jacobins—impressed on him the ideals of freedom, equality and fraternity.

== Reign ==
Augustus was already a supporter of Napoleon Bonaparte when he succeeded his father in 1804, which proved to be an advantage during the Napoleonic Wars. Saxe-Gotha-Altenburg joined the Confederation of the Rhine in 1806. When the French Army marched into his duchy in this year, Augustus remained in Gotha and thus prevented a potential escalation. He also stood up for the imprisoned critical journalist Rudolph Zacharias Becker and persuaded the military commander to swiftly set him free.

Napoleon Bonaparte, who always started his letters to Augustus with mon cousin and ended them with votre cousin, visited the Duke several times in Gotha as a sign of his appreciation, but never stayed the night at Friedenstein Castle. The following visits by Napoleon to the town (some of them very short) and meetings with Duke Augustus are known:

- 23 July 1807 (reception at the Schloss and lunch with the Duke and Duchess)
- 27 September 1808 (on the way to the Congress of Erfurt, meeting with the Duke and dinner at the Schloss)
- 14 October 1808 (return from the Congress of Erfurt, stop at Schloss Friedrichsthal and brief meeting with Augustus)
- 15 December 1812 (on the way to Russia, no meeting with Augustus)
- 25 October 1813 (return from Russia, overnight stay at the inn Zum Mohren, no meeting with Augustus).

From 1811 to 1813 the Duke celebrated Napoleon's birthday on 15 August with a gala reception at Schloss Friedenstein. In 1807 he had acquired one of Napoleon's bicorn hats from his servant Louis Constant Wairy, which is displayed to this day at Friedenstein. On Napoleon's visit on 23 July 1807, Augustus gave the French Emperor an extravagant black carriage, which Napoleon however declined to use, due to its similarity with a death's head. Augustus' Napoleon obsession peaked when he built a Napoleon room in Friedenstein Palace in the Empire style, which he had designed personally — still a highlight of the museum today. The room's ceiling shows a starry sky with sun and moon, while the sun shows features of Napoleon, and the moon shows Augustus' face.

Augustus was known as a patron and collector of art, but had an aversion to hunting or riding. Carl Maria von Weber (whose debts he paid) dedicated his 2nd piano concerto to him out of gratitude. He was also seen as an eccentric, with a penchant for shocking or provocative appearances. Johann Wolfgang von Goethe described him as "pleasant and distasteful at the same time" and noted: "I can not complain about him, but it was always a nervous matter accepting an invitation to his table, as one could not predict which of the guests of honour he might decide on a whim to treat mercilessly". His tendency towards transvestism is characteristic: he liked to appear in women's clothing and thereby shock the court of Gotha. The well-known painter Caroline Louise Seidler, who was at the court of Gotha in the winter of 1811 to paint the Duke's family, described him as the "greatest original of his time," whose appearance had something "lady-like" about it. He also had a preference for dancing, wearing silk socks and feminine clothes. He called himself "Emilie" among his friends. There are references to a possible homosexuality in his literary works. In 1805 he published anonymously the poetic novel A Year in Arcadia: Kyllenion. This is a pastoral idyll, set in ancient Greece, in which several couples fall in love, overcome various obstacles and live happily ever after. It is unique in that one of the couples is homosexual and their love affair is treated no differently from that of any of the others. This is perhaps the first novel since antiquity in which same-sex love is treated in such a way, as can be seen in this extract:

"But the lovers [Julanthiskos and Alexis] did not embrace until they were in the spacious portico; then, they hurried together to the warm bath, where Corinthian women, with their hair in disarray, rubbed their stiff limbs with fragrant ointments. Afterward, they proceeded to a banquet, and then, exhausted and drunk with sleep, they fell asleep hand in hand, never to part again."

A man of great culture, Augustus was also in correspondence with Jean Paul, Madame de Stäel and Bettina von Arnim.

After Napoleon's final defeat at Waterloo, and the Vienna Congress, Augustus became a persona non grata in aristocratic and diplomatic circles, and was likewise unpopular with the nationalist-inclined public. He died on 17 May 1822 in Gotha. The circumstances of his sudden death after a brief illness are unclear.

Succeeded by his brother Frederick as Duke, Augustus was buried on an island in the lake of the Schlosspark on a crypt specially decorated for him, and where his second wife Karoline Amalie was also buried in 1848. Like the other graves of the Duke's family, his tomb is not marked with any monument. The simple floral oval, which once marked the tomb, has not been recognisable for decades, and thus the exact burial location of the couple is unknown.

== Marriages and issue ==
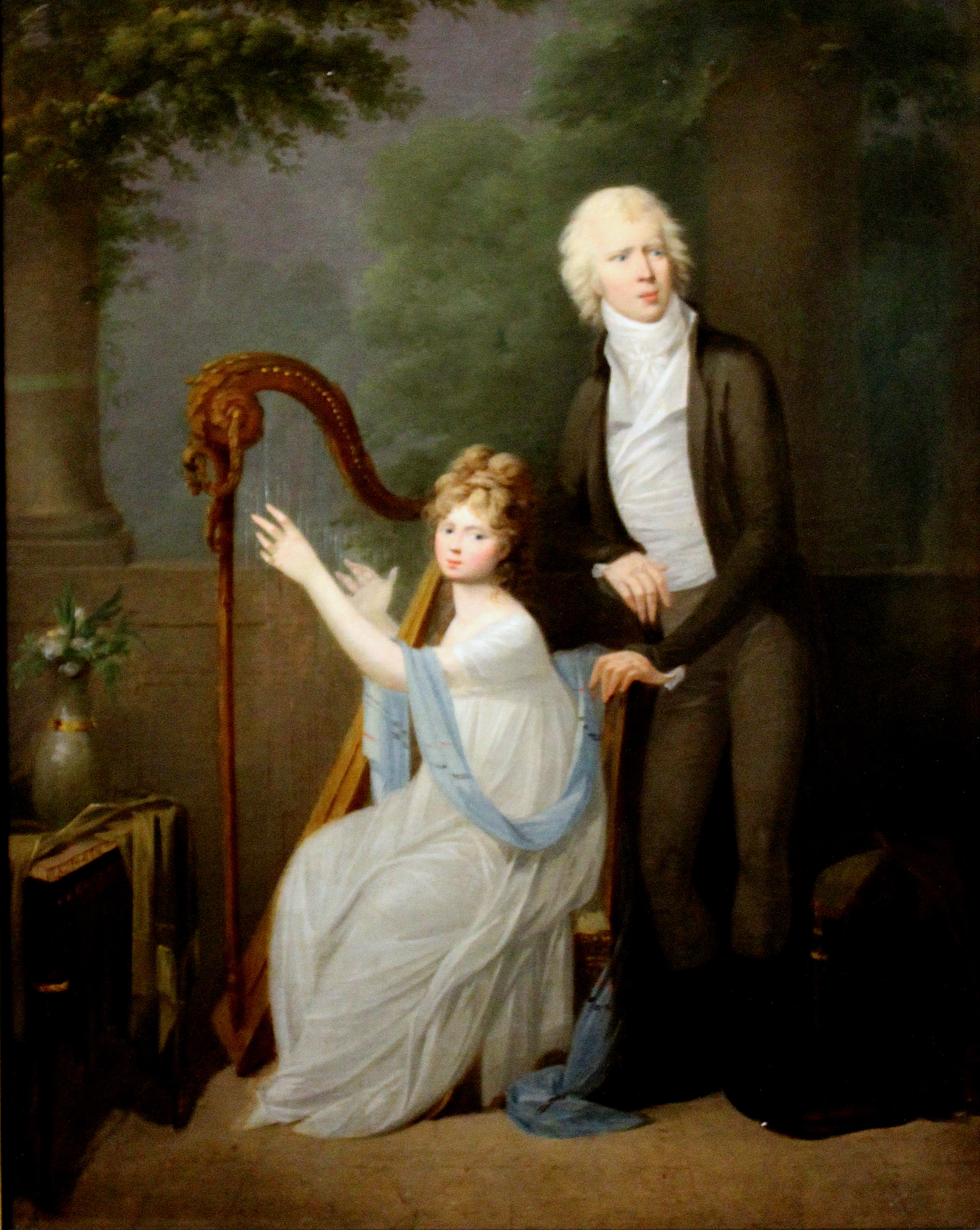
Augustus pictured with his first wife, Louise Charlotte, playing the harp.

In Ludwigslust on 21 October 1797 Augustus married firstly Louise Charlotte of Mecklenburg-Schwerin. They had one child, a daughter:

1. Louise Dorothea Pauline Charlotte Fredericka Auguste (b. Gotha, 21 December 1800 – d. Paris, 30 August 1831). She married firstly on 31 July 1817 Ernst I, Duke of Saxe-Coburg, but they divorced in 1826; secondly, on 18 October 1826 Alexander von Hanstein, created count von Pölzig. Louise was to become the mother of Prince Albert of Saxe-Coburg and Gotha, husband of Queen Victoria, and through him, Augustus is the ancestor of all British monarchs beginning with Edward VII, and of numerous reigning monarchs across Europe.

Duchess Louise Charlotte died on 4 January 1801, two weeks after giving birth to Louise. Fifteen months later, on 24 April 1802, Augustus married in Kassel Karoline Amalie of Hesse-Kassel. They had no children, and became estranged soon after marrying, because "their mutual points of view about life are completely different". Appearances together in public became rare after 1810, and after 1813 Karoline Amalie no longer lived at Schloss Friedenstein with Augustus, but at Schloss Friedrichsthal.

== Anecdotes ==
"At the Congress of Erfurt in 1808, Napoleon sat opposite the Duke at dinner, and as the latter ate little or nothing, Napoleon asked him why he was not eating anything, whereupon the latter gallantly replied: 'I am nourishing myself from the rays of the sun, which now shines at me.' To Napoleon's question, how big his country was, he responded: 'Sire, as big as your Majesty orders."

On the way to the Congress of Erfurt, Napoleon made a stop in 1808 at the Friedenstein. In conversation with Duke Augustus the Emperor asked for a cup of hot chocolate. This was brought to him by the Duke himself, with the remark that this cup had been made in his own porcelain factory. Napoleon's request to be able to keep the fine cup as a souvenir, however, was denied by the Duke. To the Emperor's stern question as to why this was not possible, Augustus replied that he would rather give him his duchy. For the great French Emperor had just drunk from this very cup, and he, Augustus, would in future hold it in honour like a rare antique. Napoleon showed himself very flattered by this.

== Ancestry ==
Ancestors of Augustus, Duke of Saxe-Gotha-Altenburg

8. Frederick II, Duke of Saxe-Gotha-Altenburg
4. Frederick III, Duke of Saxe-Gotha-Altenburg
9. Princess Magdalena Augusta of Anhalt-Zerbst
2. Ernest II, Duke of Saxe-Gotha-Altenburg
10. Ernst Ludwig I, Duke of Saxe-Meiningen
5. Princess Luise Dorothea of Saxe-Meiningen
11. Dorothea Marie of Saxe-Gotha-Altenburg
1. Augustus, Duke of Saxe-Gotha-Altenburg
12. Bernhard I, Duke of Saxe-Meiningen
6. Anton Ulrich, Duke of Saxe-Meiningen
13. Elisabeth Eleonore of Brunswick-Wolfenbüttel
3. Princess Charlotte of Saxe-Meiningen
14. Charles I, Landgrave of Hesse-Philippsthal
7. Princess Charlotte Amalie of Hesse-Philippsthal
15. Caroline Christine of Saxe-Eisenach

Augustus, Duke of Saxe-Gotha-Altenburg House of Wettin Born: 23 November 1772 Died: 27 May 1822
Regnal titles
| Preceded by Ernest II | Duke of Saxe-Gotha-Altenburg; 1804–1822 | Succeeded by Frederick IV |
