= Heldburger Gangschar =

Coordinates: 50.2886°N 10.7286°E

The Heldburger Gangschar is a Cenozoic volcanic system in the Franconian parts of southern Thuringia and northern Bavaria. The term Gangschar refers to the fact that few of the volcanoes have retained their characteristic topographical shape, rather their former activity can be detected by filled fissures known as Gänge ("[mineral] veins"). These veins are mostly oriented in south-southwest direction, their cross-section is often less than one metre wide. The Heldburger Gangschar' is named after the small settlement of Heldburg, part of the borough of Bad Colberg-Heldburg. The surrounding area, the Heldburger Land, belongs entirely to the northern part of the volcanic zone. The most impressive of the surviving volcanic cones by far are the twin peaks of the Gleichberge, 641 metres and 679 metres high, in nearby Heldburger Land.

== Location ==
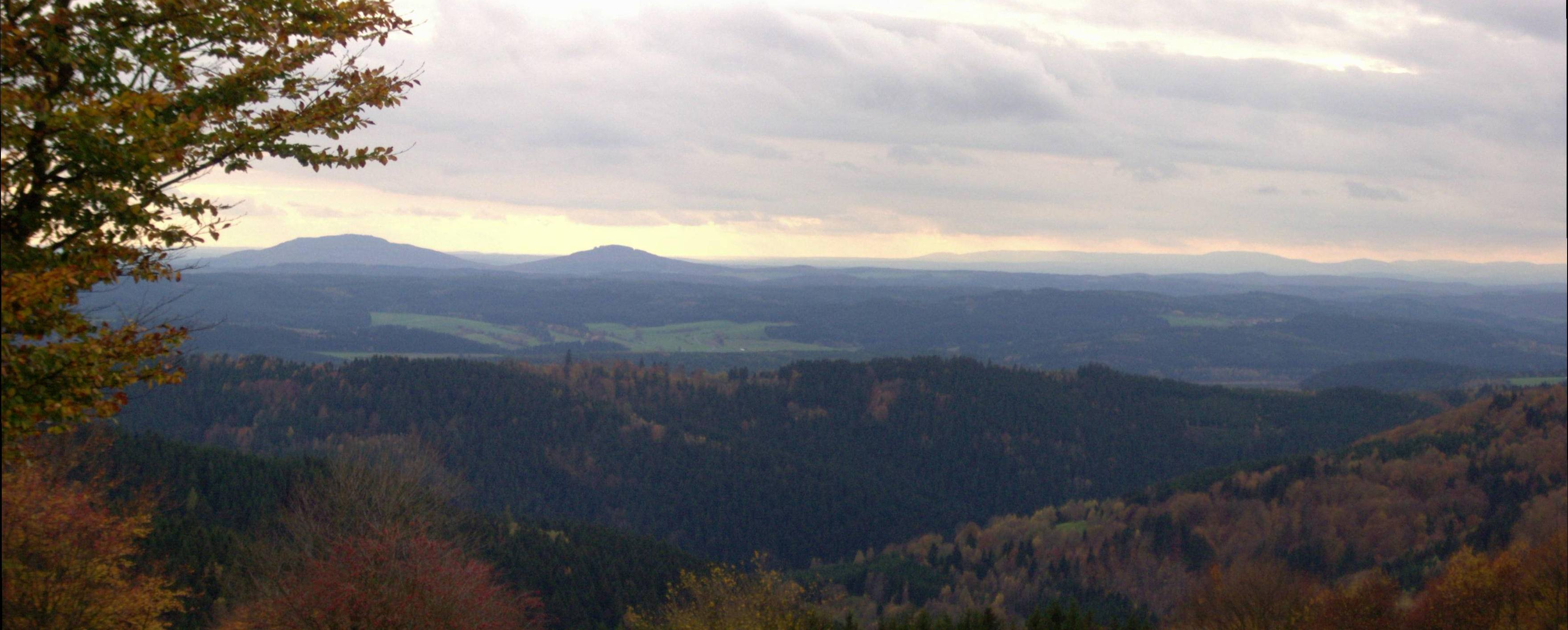
The high rocky mountains of the Gleichberge (679 m and 641 m) in nearby Heldburger Land

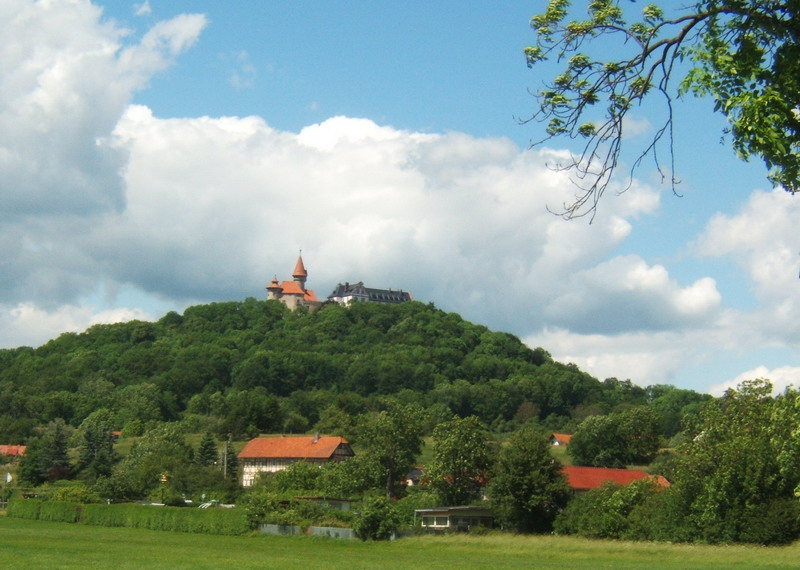
Heldburg Fortress in Heldburger Land on the 405-metre-high, hill made of phonolite

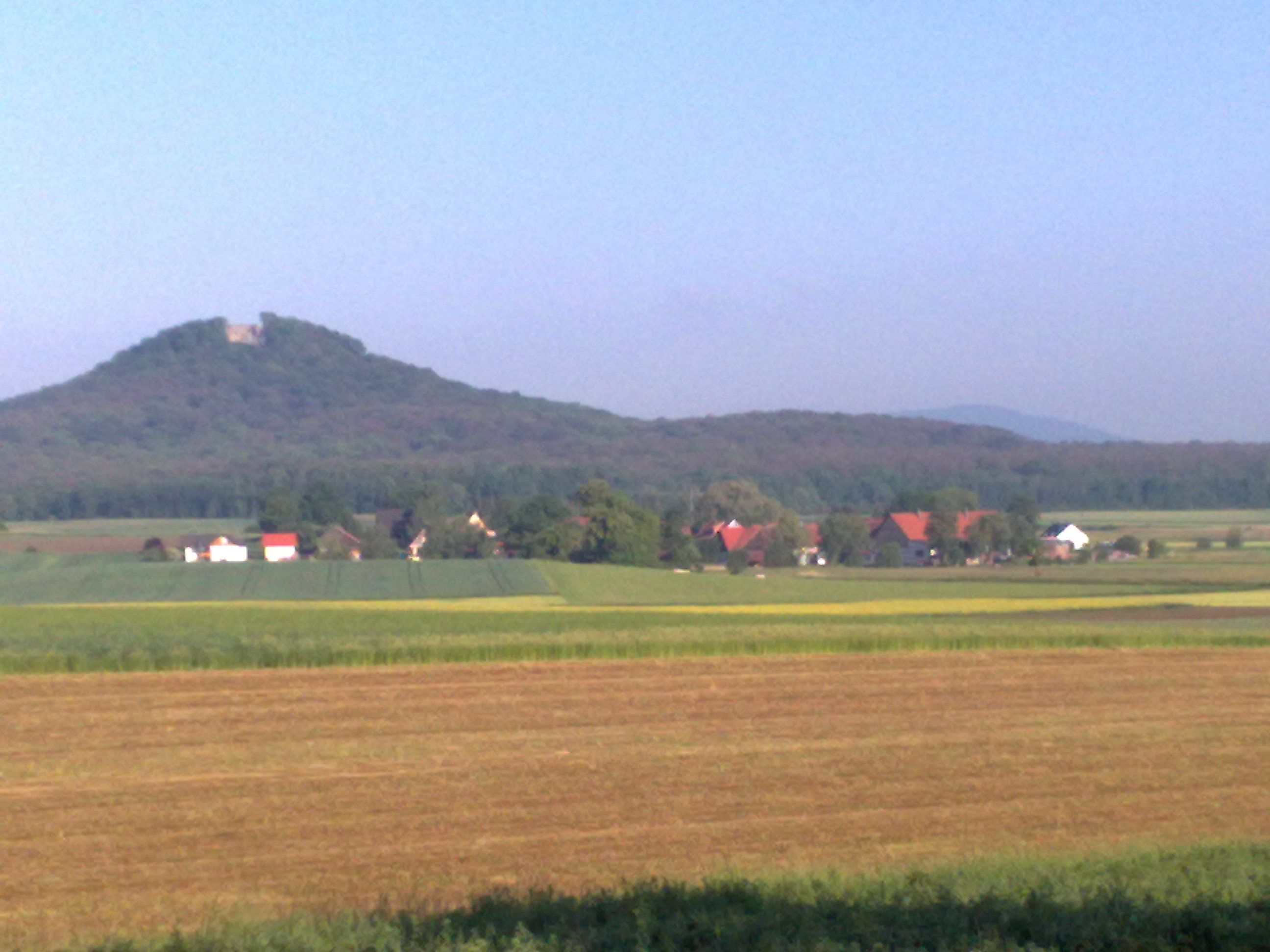
The 449-metre-high hill of Straufhain with the ruins of the medieval Straufhain Castle at its summit

The Heldburger Gangschar is not a self-contained landscape and is distributed mainly over the main physiographic units Grabfeld, Itz-Baunach Hill Country and Haßberge Hills. South of the river Main their former activity is also detectable in the northern Steigerwald and Franconian Jura. Its core zone extends from Hildburghausen to Gerolzhofen.

== Volcanic cones ==
The following are the best known, preserved volcanic cones, together with details of their height, approximate age and rock in brackets:

- Großer Gleichberg ( 679 m, 15 million years old, Alkaliolivinbasalt ) — situated in Grabfeld
- Kleiner Gleichberg ( 641 m) — situated in Grabfeld
- Bramberg (495 m, 15 million years old, alkali olivine basalt) — situated in the Hassberge
- Zeilberg ( 463 m, 16 million years old, nepheline-basanite) — situated in Itz-Baunach-Hügelland
- Straufhain ( 449 m ) - situated in the Itz-Baunach Hill Country — Heldburger Land
- Veste Heldburg(mountain) (405 m, 12 million years old, phonolite-olivine-tephrite vein) — situated in the Itz-Baunach Hill Country - Heldburger Land

Older volcanoes such as the Oberleinleiter in the Franconian Jura (31 million years old, olivine-melilite-nephelinite and olivine-nephelinite) are no longer recognizable as such by their topography. Although the latter reaches a height of 505 metres, it is overshadowed by the Jurassic rocks of the Alps.

== Literature ==
- Gerd Geyer, Hermann Schmidt-Kaler: Coburger Land und Heldburger Gangschar: Wanderungen in die Erdgeschichte; Verlaf Pfeil; ISBN 978-3899370683
- Norbert Klaus Fuchs: Das Heldburger Land – ein historischer Reiseführer. Verlag Rockstuhl, Bad Langensalza 2013, ISBN 978-3-86777-349-2.
