= Bad Rodach =

- Town
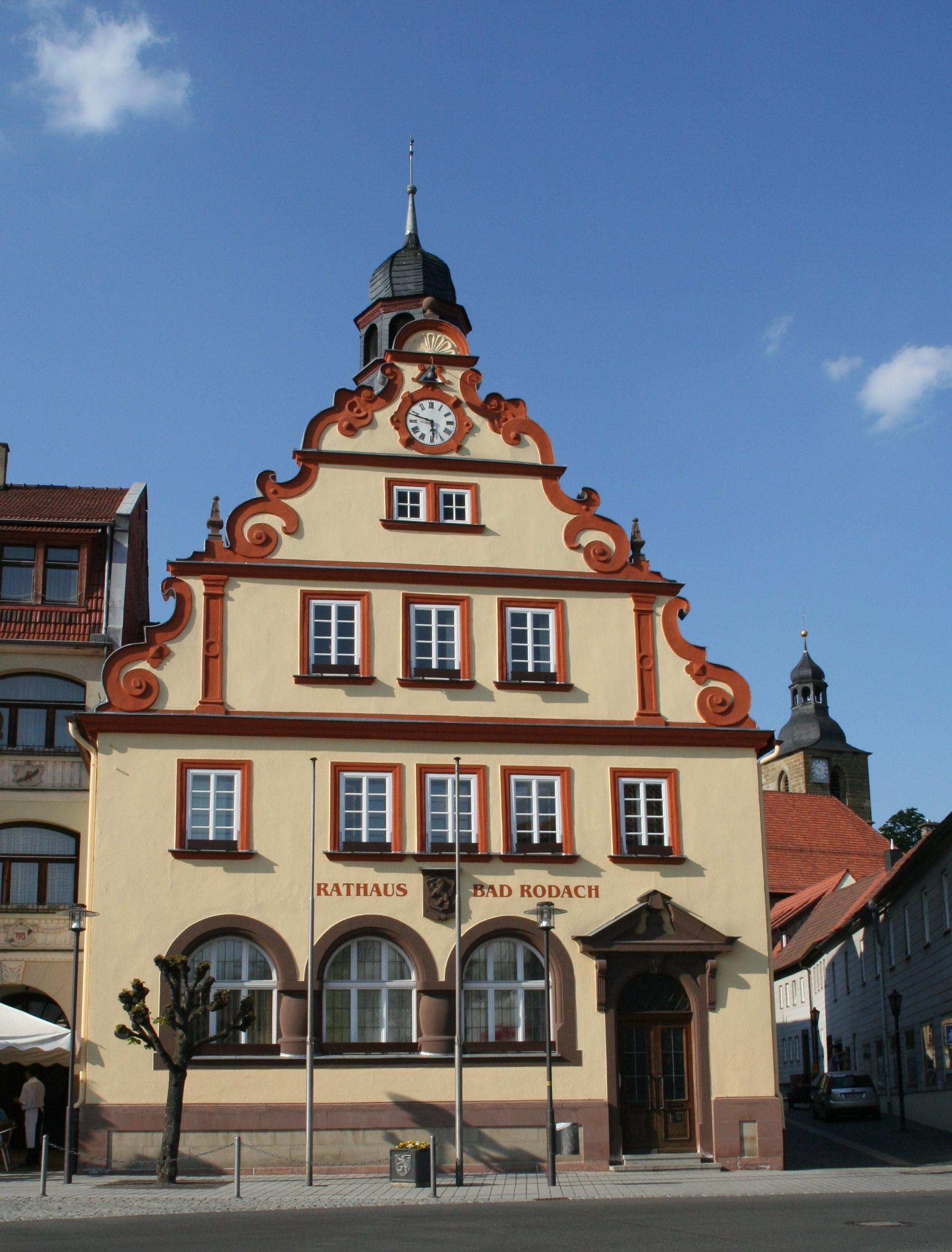
- Town hall

- Coat of arms

- Location of Bad Rodach within Coburg district
- Interactive map of Bad Rodach
- Location within Germany Location within Bavaria
- Coordinates: 50°20′N 10°47′E
- Country: Germany
- State: Bavaria
- Admin. region: Oberfranken
- District: Coburg
- Subdivisions: 14 districts

Government
  - Mayor (2020–26): Tobias Ehrlicher (SPD)

Area
  - Total: 77.65 km^{2} (29.98 sq mi)
- Elevation: 320 m (1,050 ft)

Population (2025-12-31)
  - Total: 6,182
  - Density: 79.61/km^{2} (206.2/sq mi)
- Time zone: UTC+01:00 (CET)
  - Summer (DST): UTC+02:00 (CEST)
- Postal codes: 96476
- Dialling codes: 09564
- Vehicle registration: CO
- Website: www.bad-rodach.de

Bad Rodach (German: [baːt ˈʁoːdax]) is a town in the district of Coburg, in Upper Franconia, a north Bavarian Regierungsbezirk, Germany. It is situated 10 km southeast of Hildburghausen, and 17 km northwest of Coburg. Since 1999 the city has been a spa-resort and is reported to have the warmest thermal spring in the North of Bavaria.

== Description ==
Bad Rodach is in Upper Franconia, in the District of Coburg approximately 17 km northwest of Coburg. It is situated between the Lange Berge hills and Gleichberge mountains. The river Rodach crosses through the town.

The town is composed of the following boroughs:

- Altmühle
- Breitenau
- Carlshan
- Elsa
- Grattstadt
- Gauerstadt
- Hainmühle
- Heldritt
- Lempertshausen
- Mährenhausen
- Neumühle
- Niederndorf
- Oettingshausen
- Roßfeld
- Rudelsdorf
- Schweighof
- Sülzfeld

== History ==
Within the Holy Roman Empire (962-1806), Rodach was part of the Duchy of Saxe-Coburg-Saalfeld (1699–1825). Within the German Empire (1871-1918), Rodach was part of the Duchy of Saxe-Coburg and Gotha.

== Personalities who were active in Rodach ==
- Francis Josias, Duke of Saxe-Coburg-Saalfeld (1697-1764), sovereign of the duchy, died in Rodach.
- 1814 the poet Friedrich Rückert (1788-1866), spent a few days in Rodach and wrote his poem Idyllic Rodach .
- Helmut Markwort, (born 1936), journalist, publisher, and former editor in chief of the news magazine Focus, spent part of his youth and attended elementary school in Bad Rodach.
- Melina Swoboda, stand-up comedian and model.
