= Kleiner Gleichberg =

Mountain in Germany

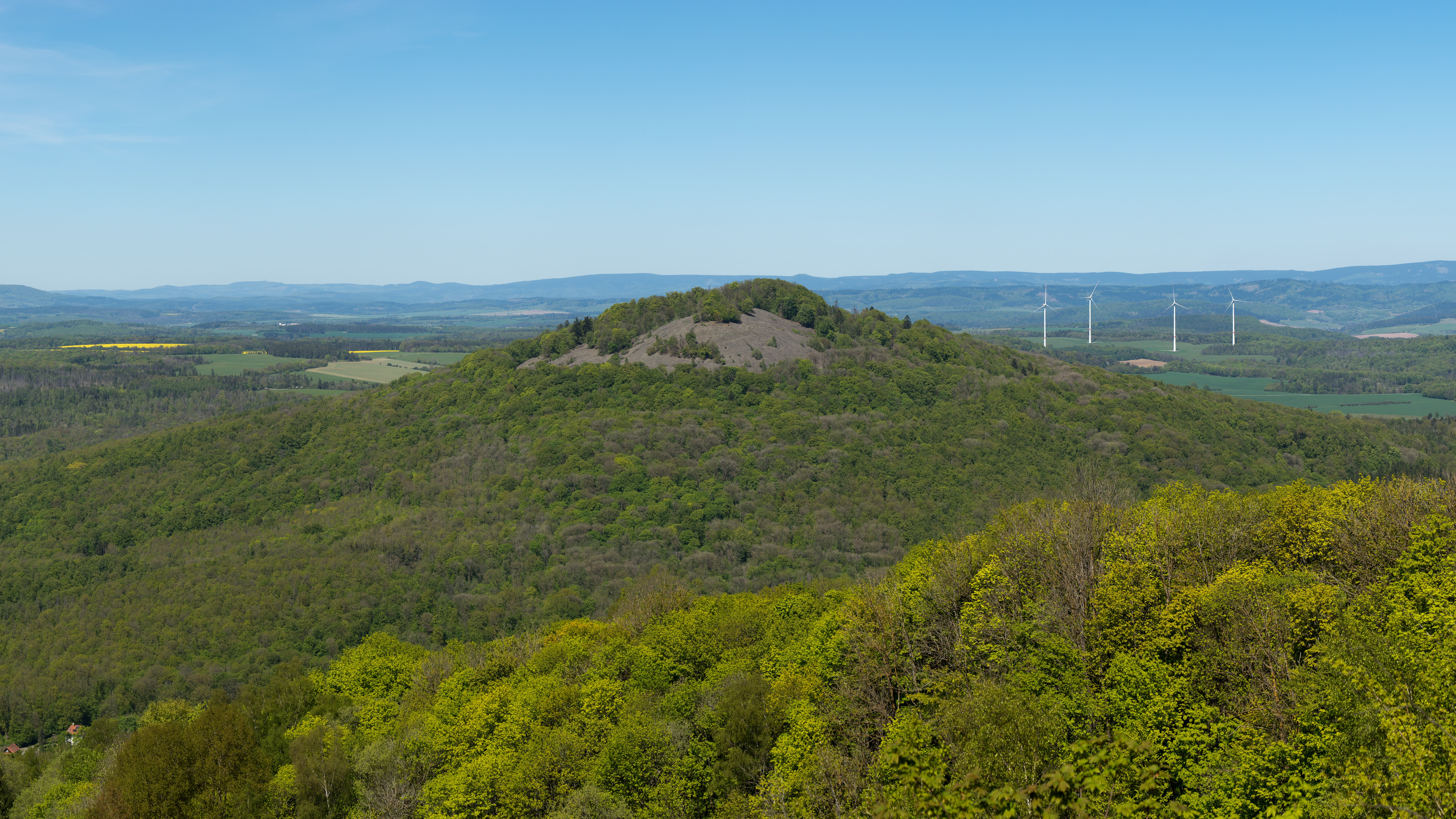
- View of the Kleiner Gleichberg from Thüringer Blick on the Großer Gleichberg

Highest point
- Elevation: 641.3 m above sea level (NHN) (2,104 ft)
- Prominence: 223 m ↓ Waldhaus
- Isolation: 2.5 km → Großer Gleichberg
- Coordinates: 50°24′44″N 10°35′34″E

Geography
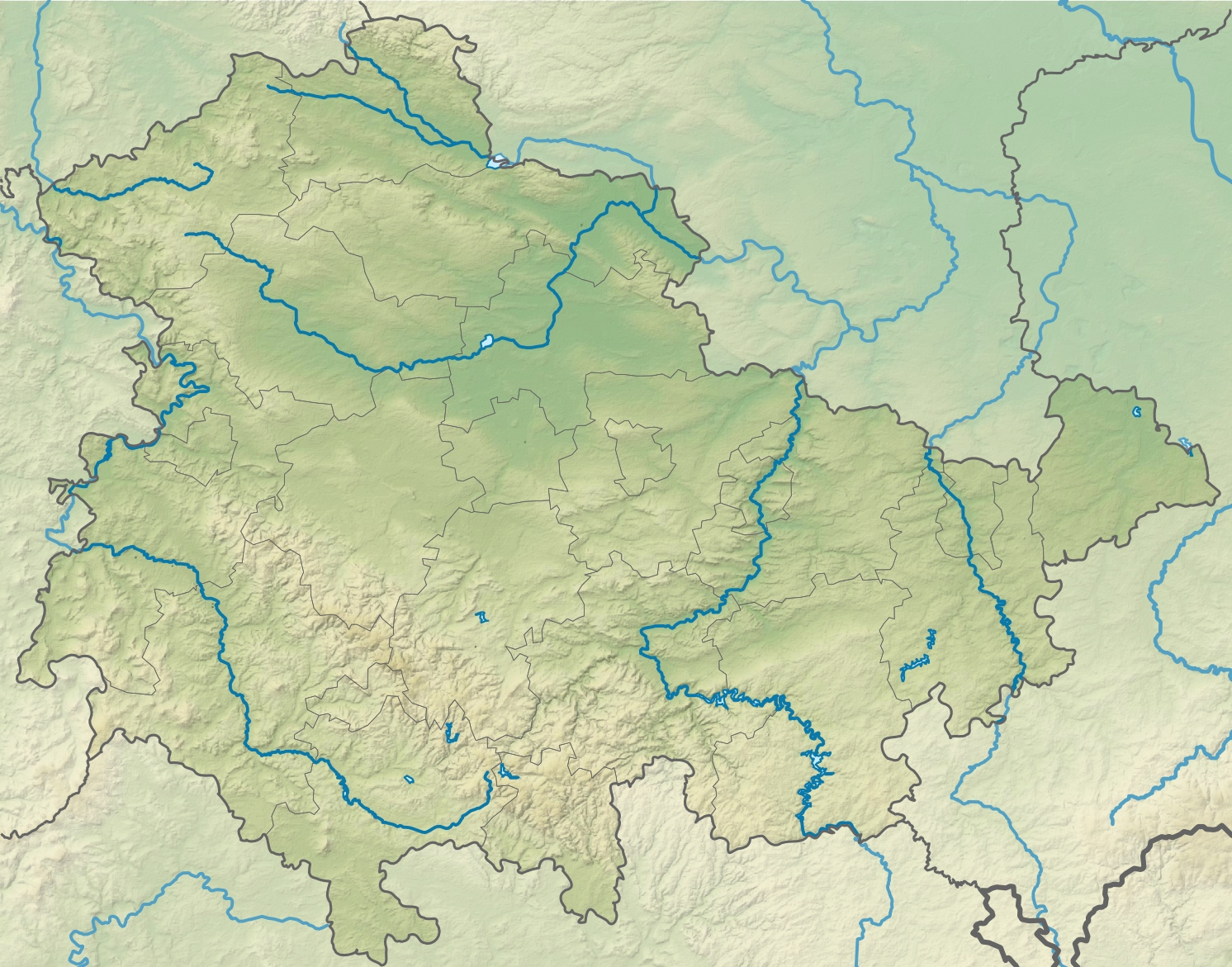
- Location within Thuringia
- Location: County of Hildburghausen, Thuringia
- Parent range: Gleichberge, singular in the Grabfeld

The Kleiner Gleichberg (641.3 m above sea level (NHN)) is the slightly lower of the two Gleichberge mountains, east of the village of Römhild in the country of Grabfeld in the county of Hildburghausen in the German state of Thuringia. The Celtic Oppidum Steinsburg is located on the mountain.

Because of the proximity of its larger brother, the Großer Gleichberg, which is less than 3 kilometres away and, at 679.0 m, slightly higher, the Kleiner Gleichberg is not particularly dominant. Nevertheless, it has a topographic prominence of over 200 metres.

A footpath runs from the Steinsburg Museum on the saddle between the two Gleichberge, almost in a straight line to a point near at the summit, before spiralling to the top as it climbs the last few metres.

From the rocky plateau on the summit of the Kleiner Gleichberg there are good all-round views, especially in winter, of the Thuringian Forest, the more distant Rhön Mountains, the Haßberge Hills, the ruined Straufhain Castle, Coburg Fortress, etc. In summer the view in some directions is restricted by trees in full leaf.

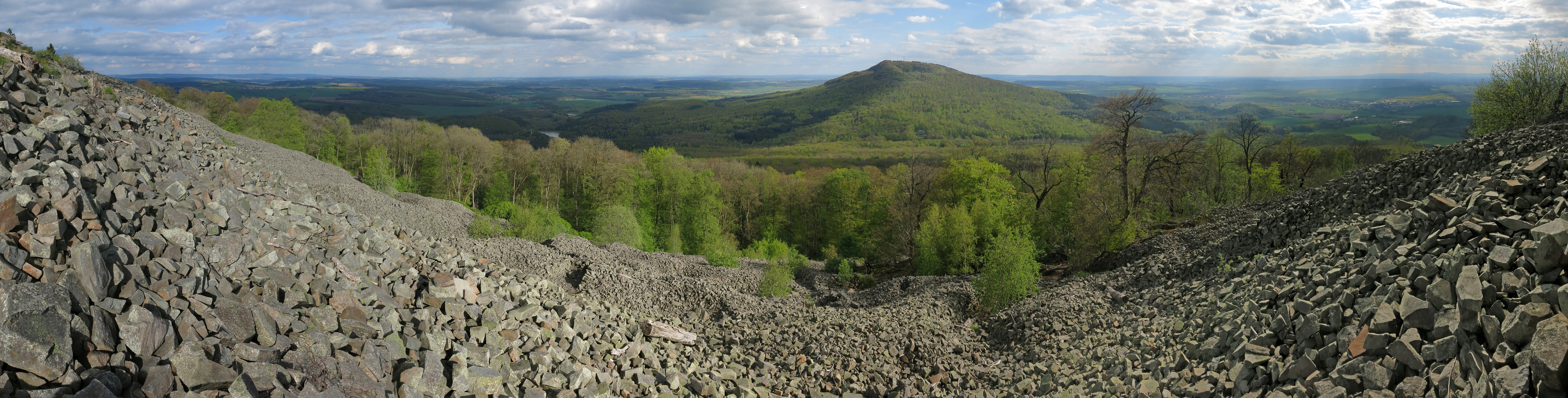
View from the stone run on the summit southward
