= Gleichberge =

Mountain range in Germany

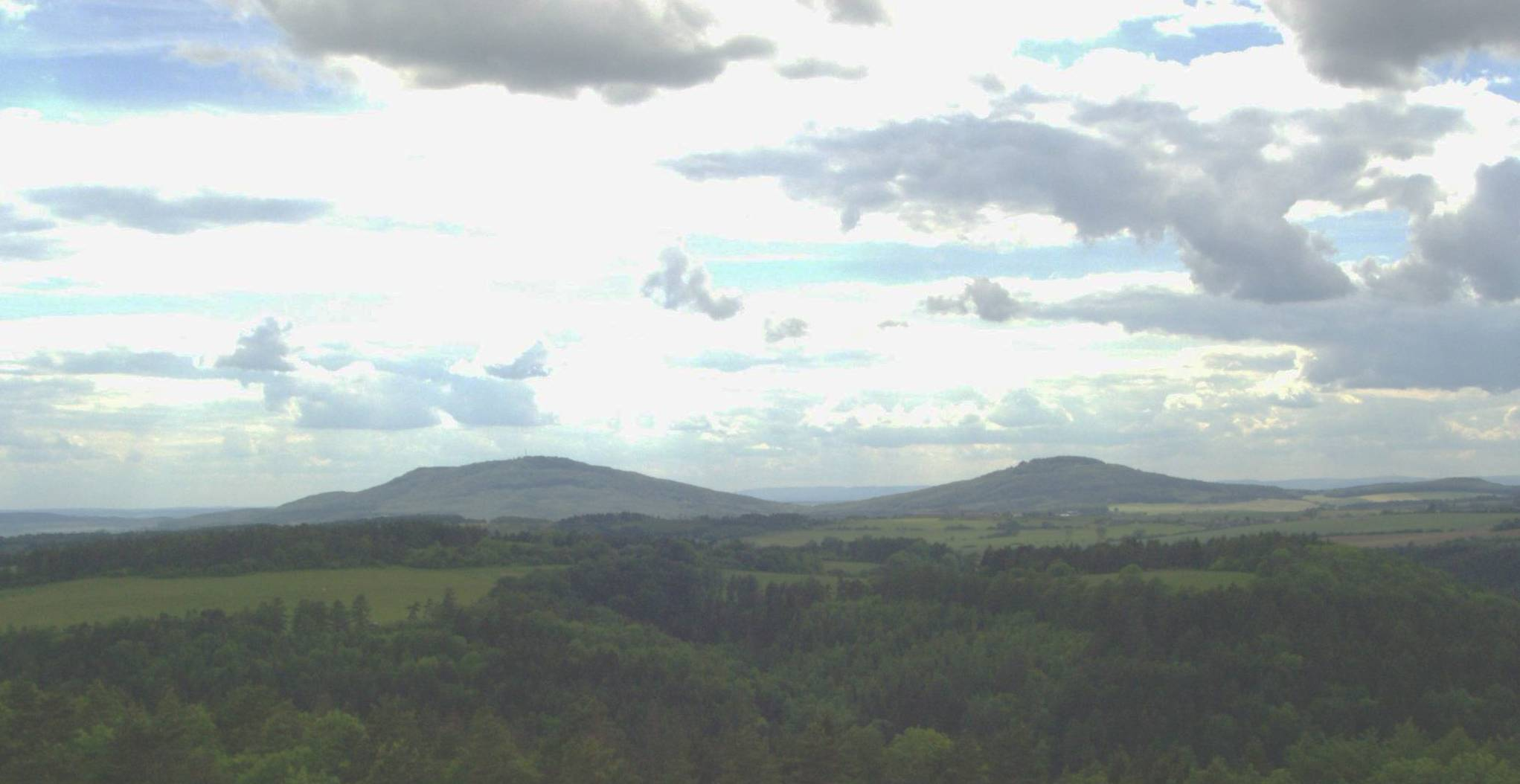
- The Gleichberge from the hill in Hildburghausen

Highest point
- Peak: Großer Gleichberg
- Elevation: 679 m above NHN

Dimensions
- Length: 5 km (3.1 mi)

Geography
- Location within Germany
- State(s): County of Hildburghausen, Thuringia, Germany
- Range coordinates: 50°24′01″N 10°35′30″E
- Parent range: Heldburger Gangschar

Geology
- Rock age: Tertiary

The Gleichberge, which mainly comprise the Großer and Kleiner Gleichberg, are a small, inselberg-like mountain range, up to 679 m above sea level (NHN), in the southwestern part of the German state of Thuringia. They rise just east of the little ancient town of Römhild in the county of Hildburghausen.

The Gleichberge are the most imposing witnesses to the Tertiary volcanic activity of the Heldburger Gangschar, which once ran from here to south of the River Main.

== Geography ==
The Gleichberge, which consist mostly of the volcanic basalt cones of the Großer Gleichberg (679.0 m) in the south and the Kleiner Gleichberg (641.3 m) in the north, are located in the county of Hildburghausen between the Thuringian town of Hildburghausen and the Franconian town of Bad Königshofen. They lie southwest of the Werra valley, roughly east of the village of Römhild, on the northeastern perimeter of the Grabfeld country.

West and northwest of the Gleichberge are the Rhön Mountains, to the northeast and east is the Thuringian Forest, to the southeast lie the hills of the Lange Berge, to the south are the Haßberge Hills and to the southwest is the region of Grabfeld, to which the Gleichberge belong and of which they are its highest peaks. At the foot of the Großer Gleichberg is the village of Gleichamberg.

The almost entirely wooded Gleichberge extend for eight kilometres from north to south and three kilometres from east to west. Their two peaks are just under three kilometres apart.

== Waterbodies ==
The Kleiner Gleichberg lies on the Rhine-Weser watershed between the Vogelsberg and Rhön mountains (in the East Hesse Highlands) and the Lange Berge, where the Thuringian Highland adjoins and the watershed also ends not far from the source of the Werra. Whilst the water of the Milz, which is fed by various headstreams on the eastern side of the saddle between the two mountains, flows towards the southwest via the Franconian Saale and Main into the Rhine, the short streams that rise on the extreme northeastern side of the Kleiner Gleichberg and the hills north of it drain via the Werra into the Weser.

In the countryside of the Gleichberge are several reservoirs: the Buchenhof, Haina, Römhild, Roth I and Roth II. In 2011, the Roth I reservoir was drained due to safety concerns with the dam. The other basins are used as fishing lakes and provide irrigation for agriculture.

== Mountains and hills ==
The closely spaced mountains, kuppen and hills of the Gleichberge and its outliers include the following – sorted by height in metres (m) above Normalhöhennull (NHN):

- Großer Gleichberg (679.0 m), with a mobile phone mast
- Kleiner Gleichberg (641.3 m), with a Steinsburg (ruins of an oppidum)
- Kuppe (528.9 m), north of the Kleiner Gleichberg
- Schwanberg (518.5 m), north-northeast of the Kleiner Gleichberg
- Schwabhäuser Berg (511.0 m), northeast of the Kleiner Gleichberg
- Rother Kopf (455.8 m), northeast of the Großer Gleichberg
- Altenburg (435.8 m), northeast of the Großer Gleichberg
- Hartenberg (404.0 m), northeast of the Großer Gleichberg; former site of the medieval Hartenburg
- Eichelberg (381.6 m), west of the Kleiner Gleichberg; on its southwest slopes is the Römhild Reservoir

== Gallery ==
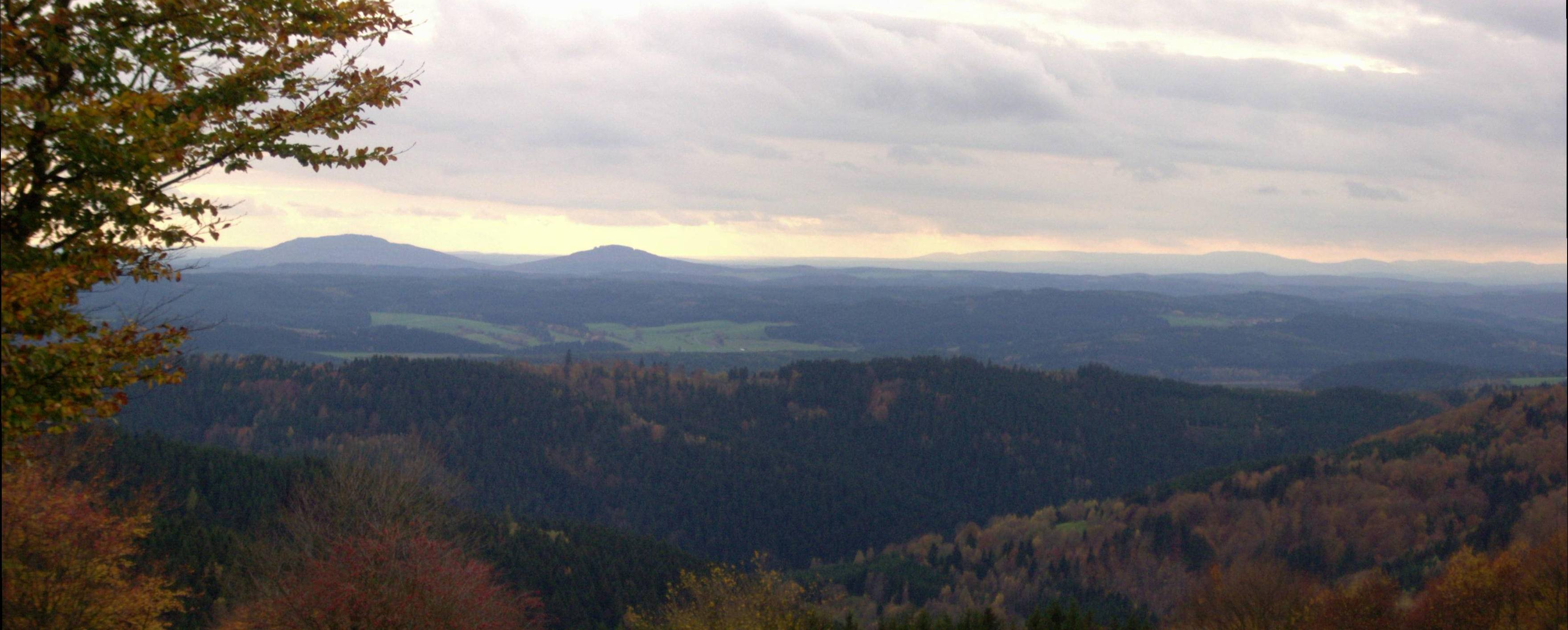
View from the Simmersberg (781 m) in the Thuringian Highland of the Gleichberge, 24 km away. Right rear: the Rhön and the Kreuzberg (927.8 m), 67 km away. Centre, half right: the Ratscher Bergsee lake, 7 km away

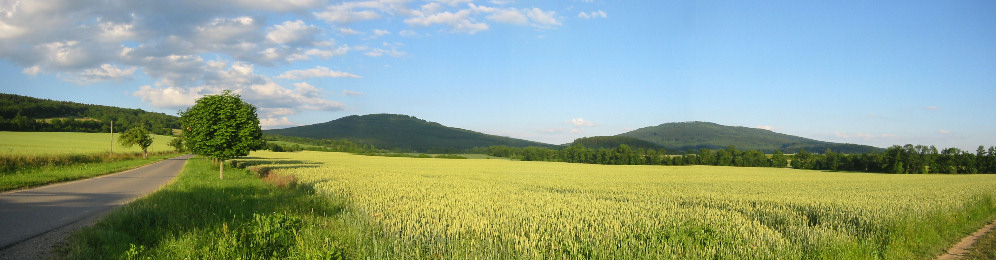
View of the Gleichberge from Haina

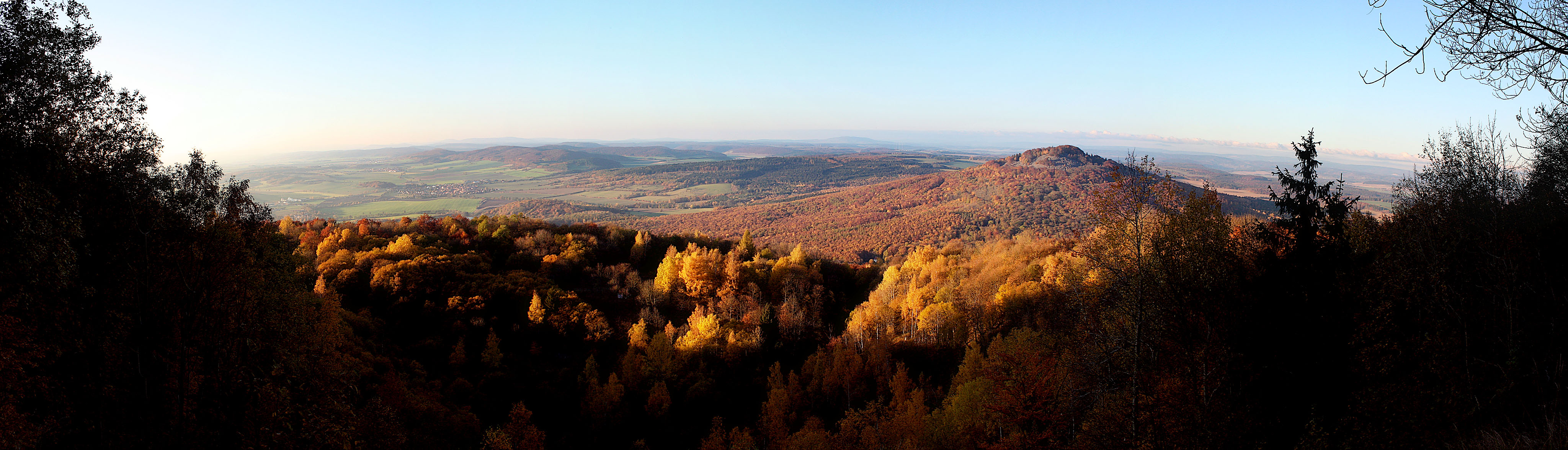
View of Thuringia from the Großer Gleichberg

== Literature ==
- Das Gleichberggebiet. Edition no. 1 Akademie-Verlag Berlin, Berlin 1963 (Werte der deutschen Heimat. Vol. 6).
