= Großer Gleichberg =

Mountain in Germany

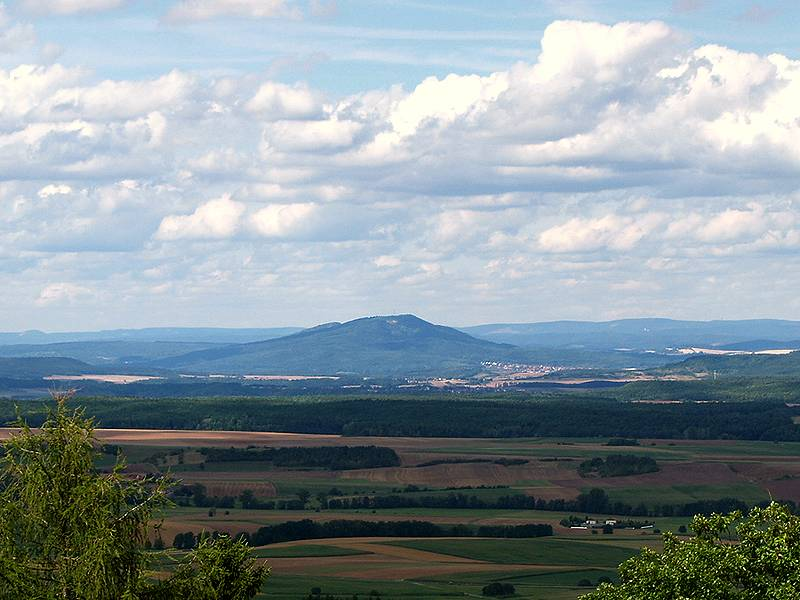
- View from observation tower on the Schwedenschanze towards the Haßberge and the Großer Gleichberg

Highest point
- Elevation: 679 m above sea level (NHN) (2,227.7 ft)
- Prominence: 276 m ↓ northeast of Steinfeld
- Isolation: 23.5 km → Hohe Warth, boundary of the Thuringian Highland/Thuringian Forest
- Coordinates: 50°23′16″N 10°35′29″E

Geography
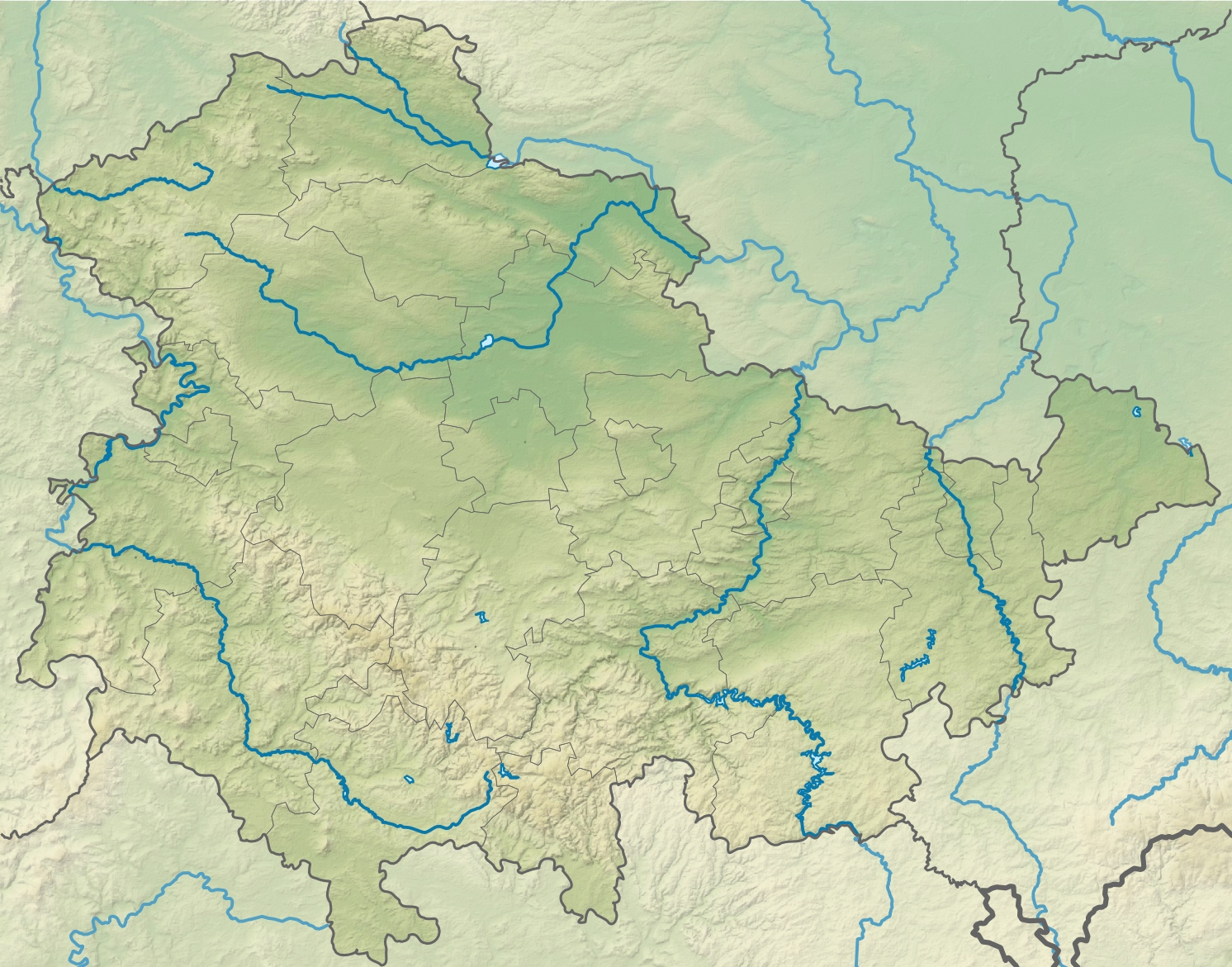
- Location within Thuringia
- Location: County of Hildburghausen, Thuringia
- Parent range: Gleichberge (singular in the Grabfeld)

At 679 m above sea level (NHN), the Großer Gleichberg is the higher of the two adjacent mountaintops known as the Gleichberge east of Römhild in the landscape of Grabfeld and the county of Hildburghausen in the German state of Thuringia. It was formed in the Tertiary volcanic field of the Heldburger Gangschar and is the highest point today of that formation.

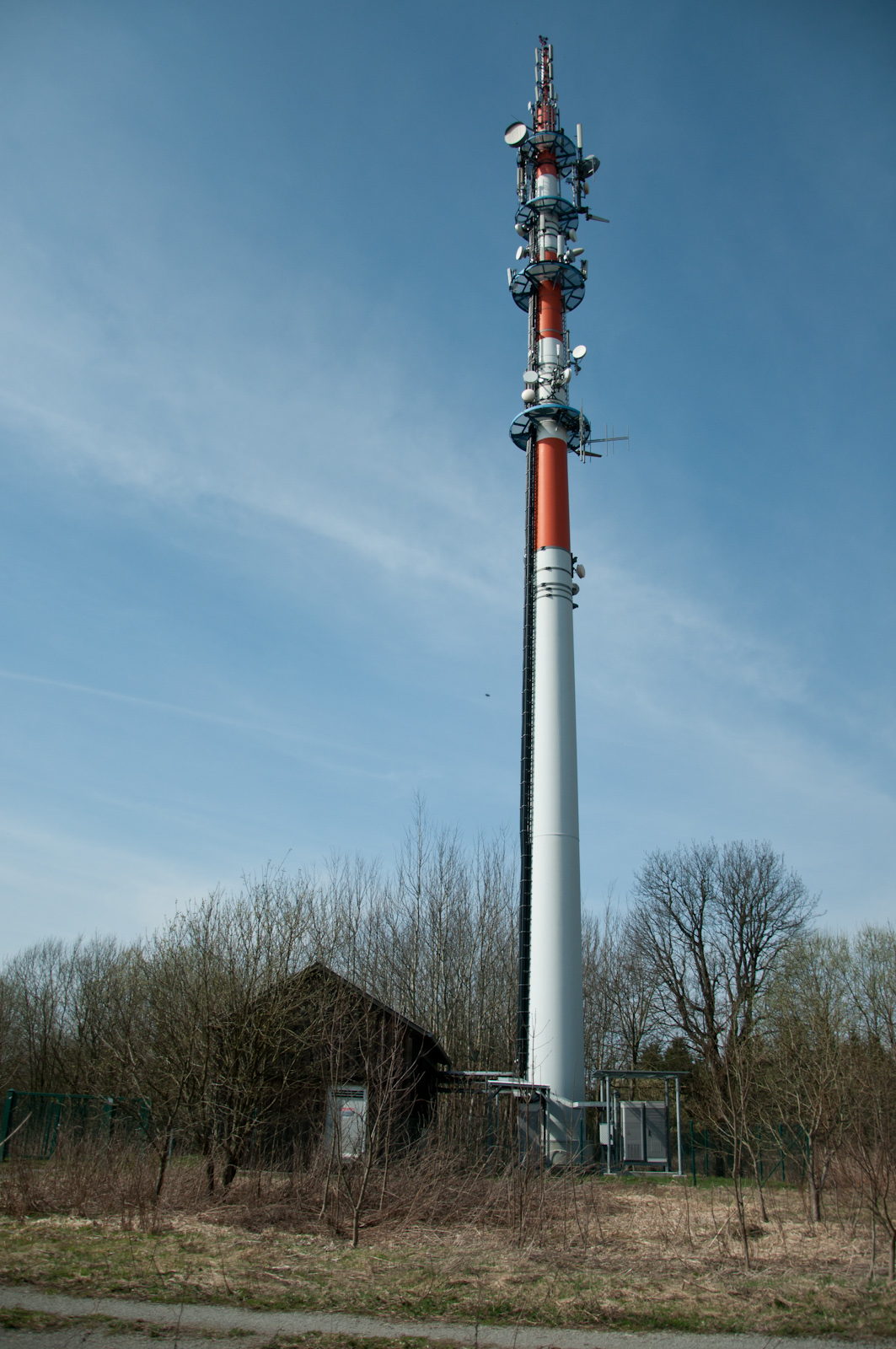
Mast on the Großer Gleichberg

With an isolation of well over 20 kilometres and a prominence of just under 300 metres, the Großer Gleichberg is one of the most striking mountains in Thuringia.

In the Cold War period from 1968 to 1991 there was a military out-of-bounds area at the summit with a radio and radar station belonging to the Red Army. In 1942 it had been declared a protected area; today the Großer Gleichberg is a nature reserve. At the summit there is a former ein ehemaliger TV converter that broadcast television to southwest Thuringia and those areas of Bavaria near the border, but now just acts as a mobile phone transceiver.

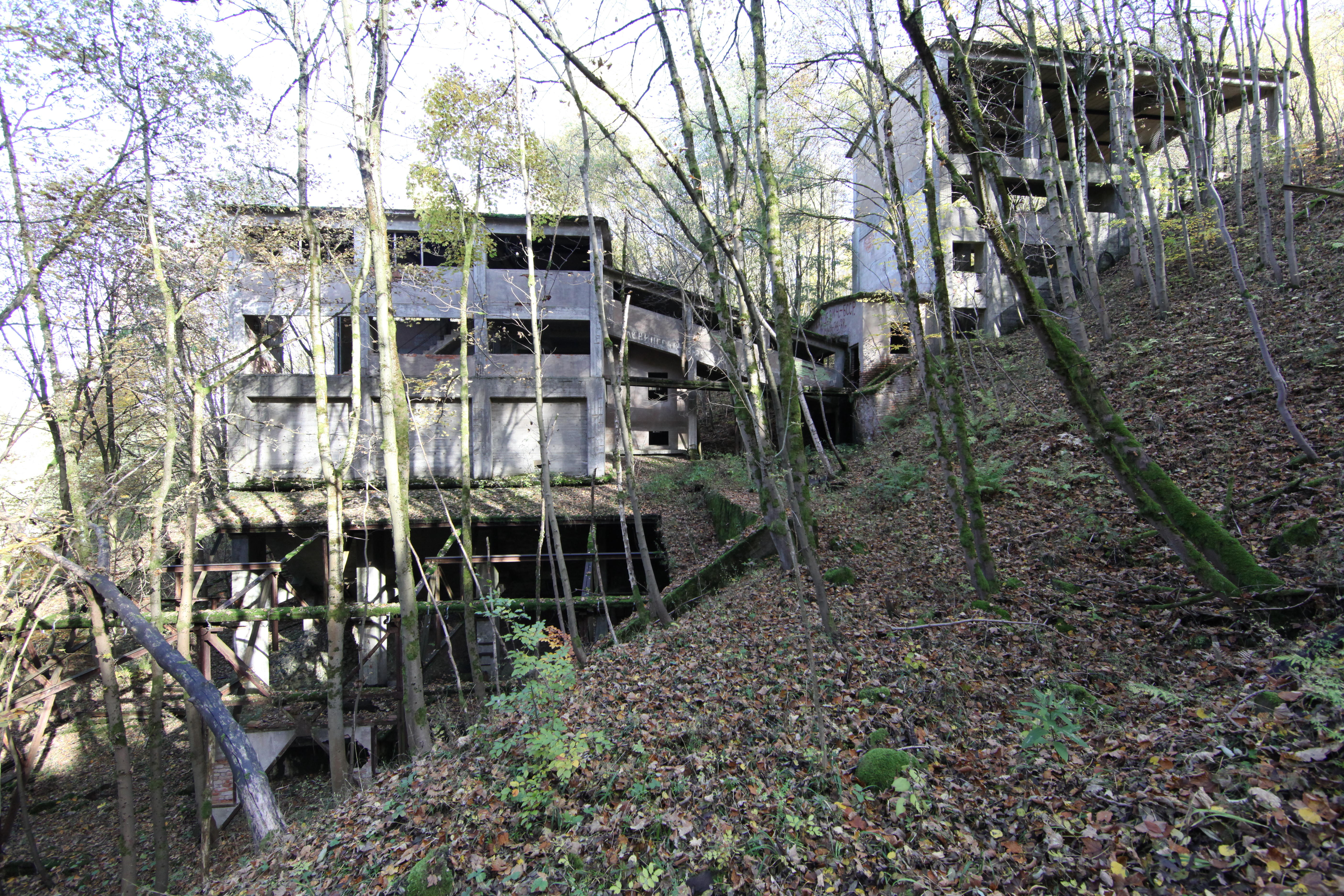
Brecherwerk Römhilder Steinbruch

Basalt used to be mined in two quarries on the Großer Gleichberg: the Gleichamberg Quarry (Gleichamberger Steinbruch) and the Römhild Quarry (Römhilder Steinbruch). The Römhild Quarry was operated from 1901 to 1968 and the ruins of its stonebreaking yard are still visible (as at: 2013). The Gleichamberg Quarry operated from 1897 to 1981 and employed up to 140 workers (in 1927). There is also a cableway with which basalt was transported in coal drams to the basalt works at the station in Römhild and to Gleichamberg. In the forest settlement (Waldhaussiedlung), on the saddle between the two Gleichberge, there is a "corner station" (Winkelstation) where the Römhild Cableway (Römhilder Seilbahn) changed direction. It was also a sawmill.

During the Nazi era, from August 1943 to March 1945, there was a forced labour camp in the Römhild Quarry in which up to about 400 "defaulting foreign" forced labourers were interned. The prisoners had to work in the basalt quarry or in the basalt works by Römhild Station. In addition they were used to build bunkers and fortifications in Mendhausen and sometimes employed in handicrafts and trades in Römhild and the surrounding area.

It has been estimated that at least 500 prisoners died in the camp or during its evacuation march in 1945. These include 25 to 92 prisoners who were unable to walk and were shot in a sand cave on the eastern side of the Großer Gleichberg. The cave entrance was subsequently blown up and the mass grave discovered in late January 1947.

According to official death lists, by the end of March 1944, 44 prisoners had been buried in the lower forest cemetery on the eastern slopes of the Großer Gleichberg, 64 prisoners had been interred at the upper cemetery and a further 61 prisoners at the municipal cemetery where there is a monument in a commemorative grove.

== Way of Remembrance ==
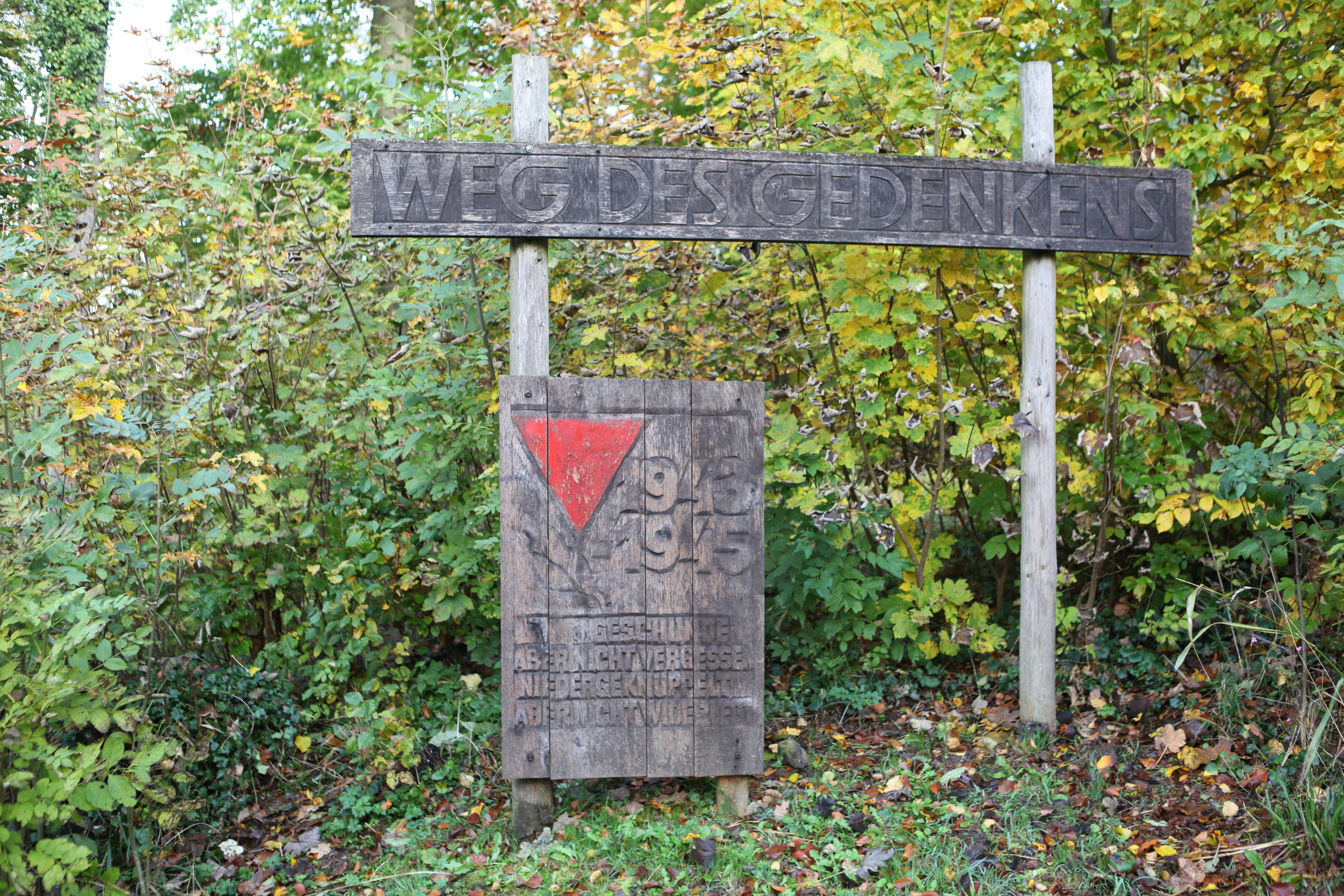
Way of Remembrance

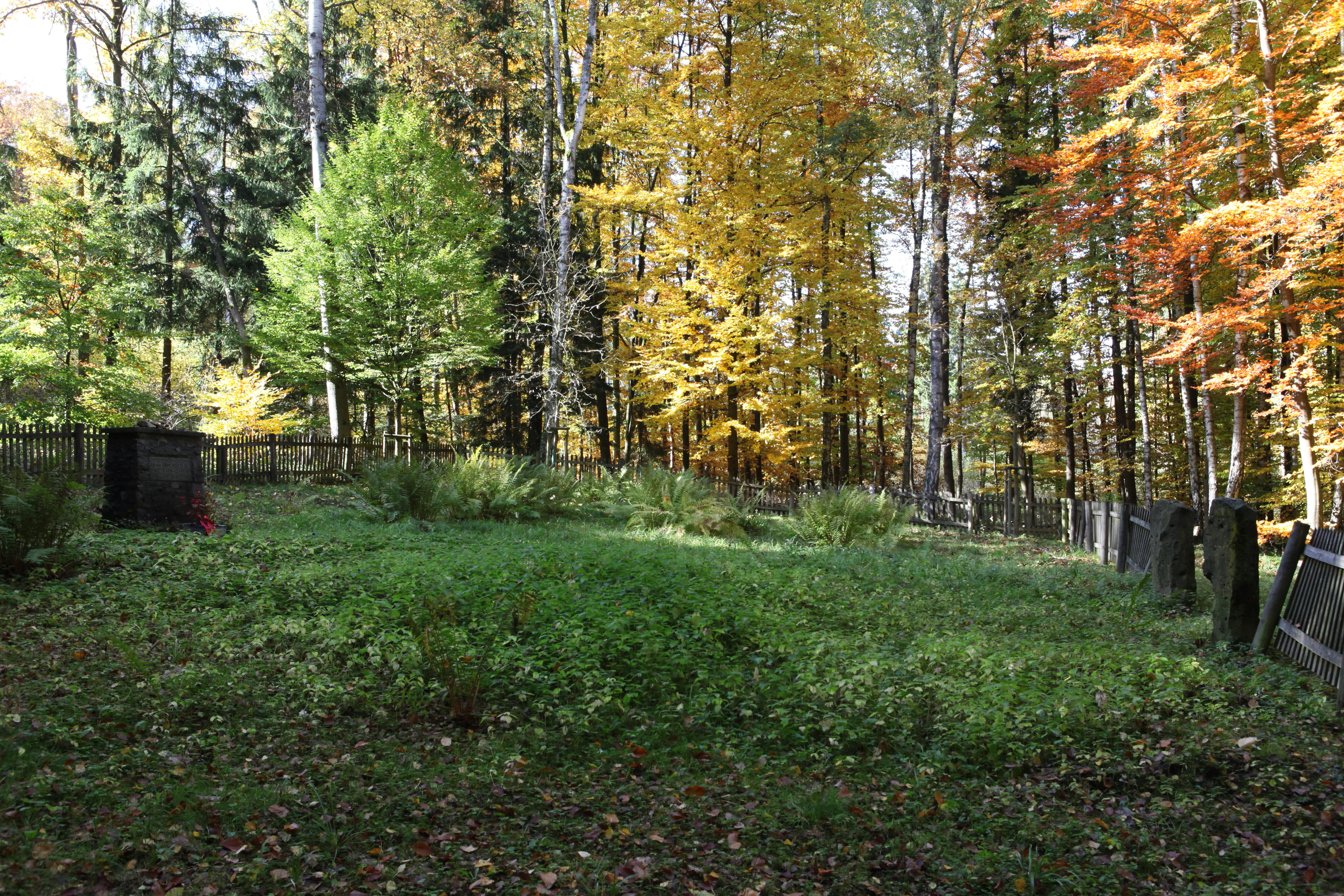
Lower Cemetery (50°23′50.92″N 10°36′2.58″E)

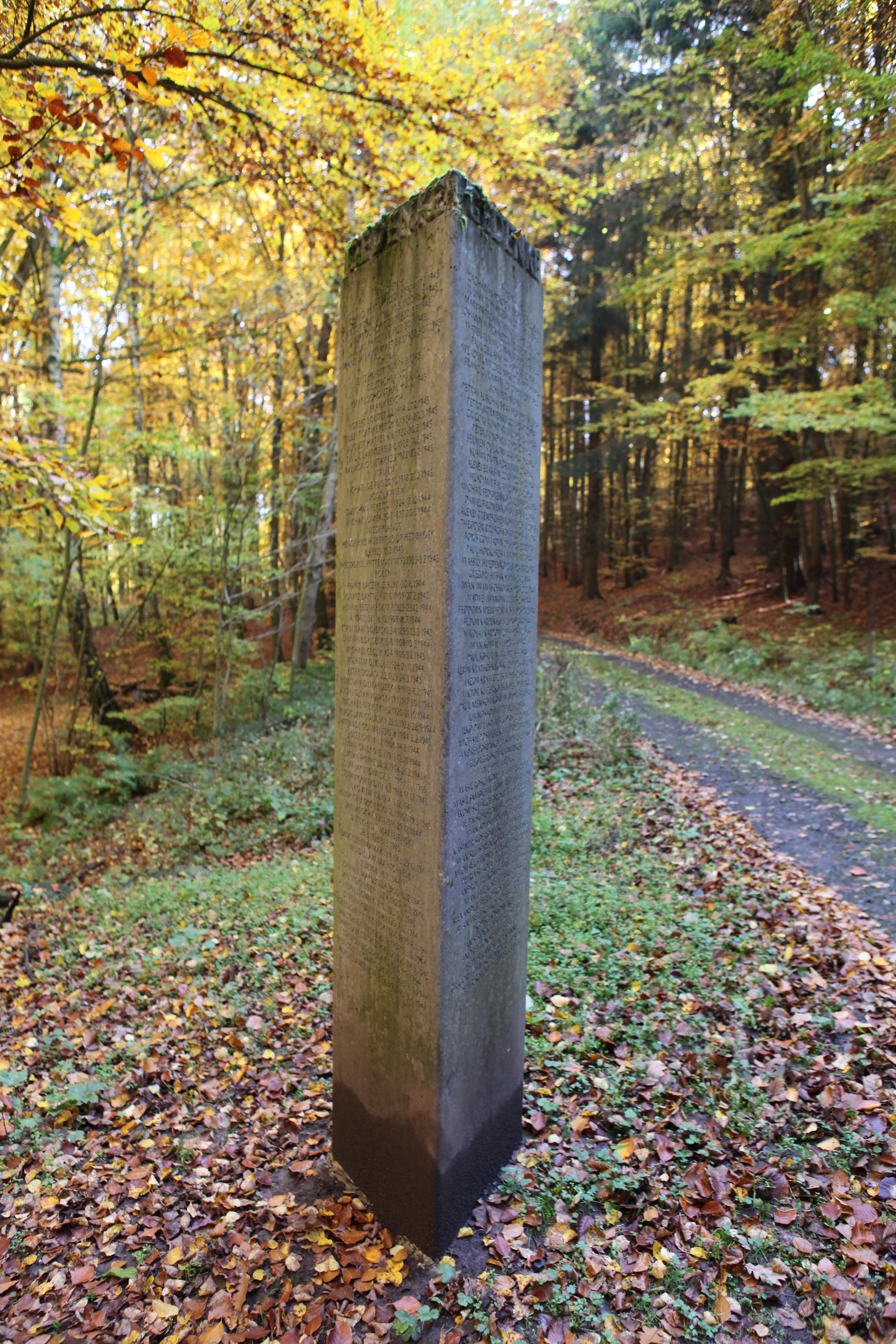
Memorial stele (50°23′47.45″N 10°35′50.24″E)

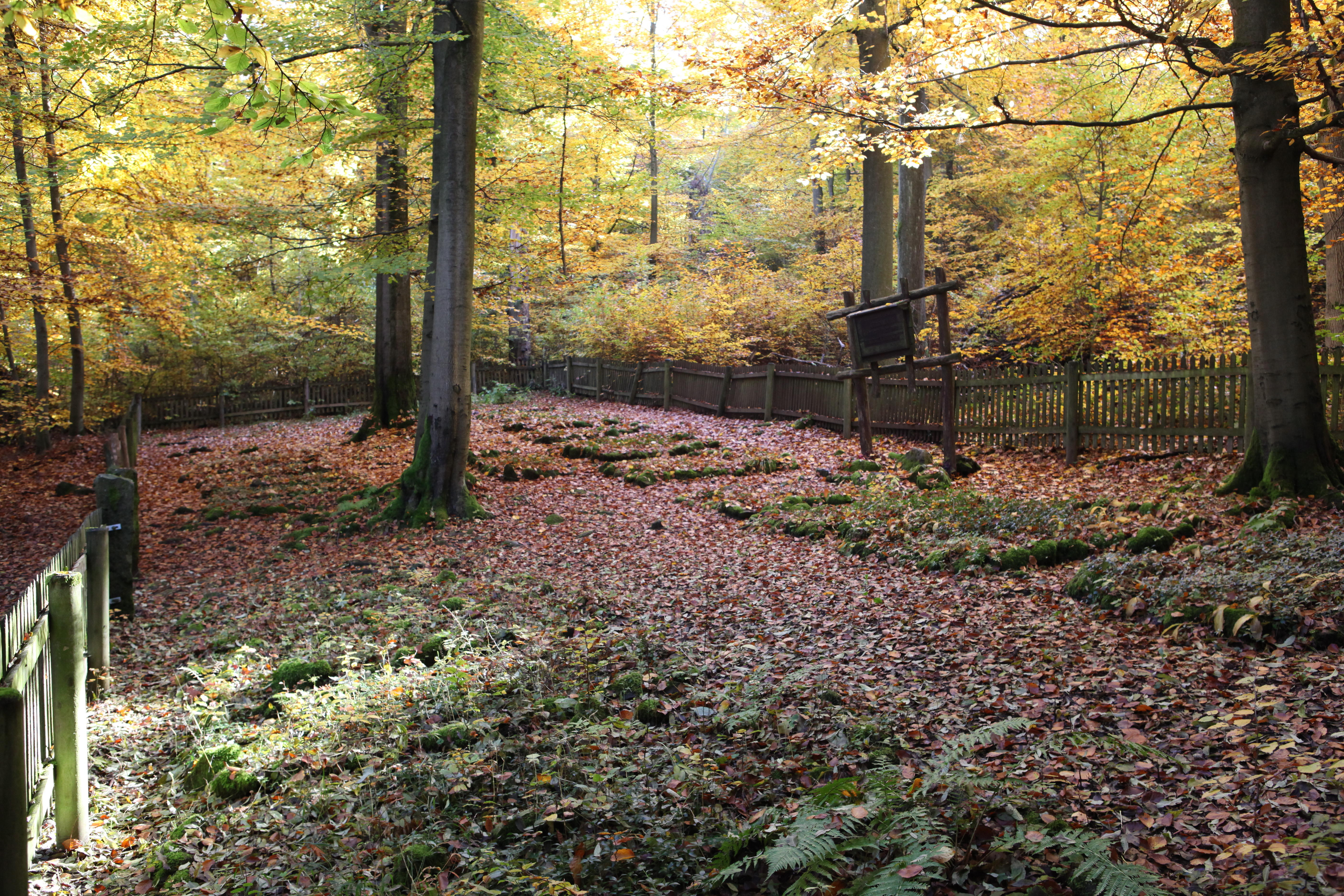
Upper Cemetery (50°23′41.85″N 10°35′46.8″E)

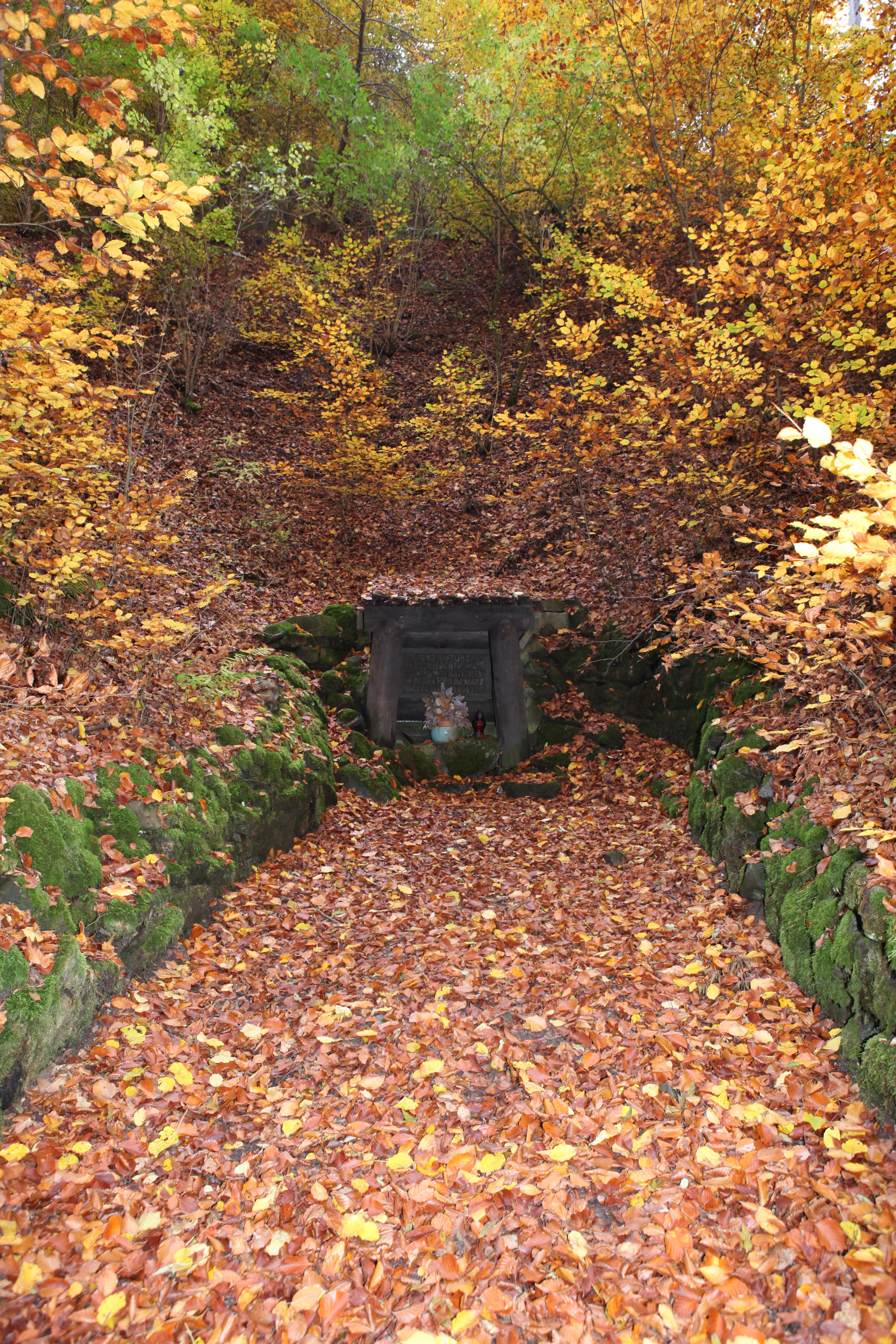
Sand Gallery (50°23′43.6″N 10°35′35.9″E)
