= Bicurgium =

Unidentified town in interior of ancient Germany

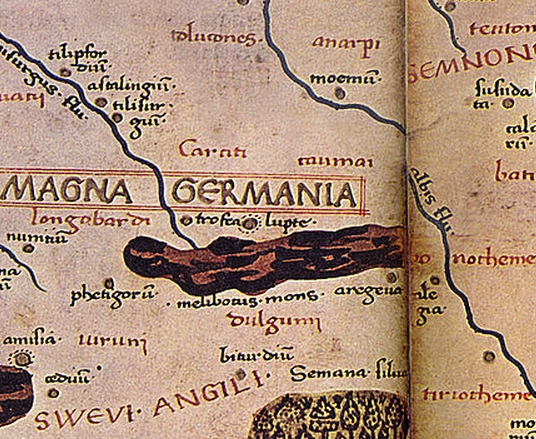
Location of Bicurgium according Ptolemy

Bicurgium (Βικούργιον) is a German town mentioned in Ptolemy's Geography (2, 11, 14) in the year 150. The place, which, according to Ptolemy lies in the interior of Germania, has not yet been positively identified. For example Bickenriede near Mühlhausen on the Unstrut or the Celtic fortress of Steinsburg near Römhild has been suggested as the site of Bicurgium. An interdisciplinary research team led by Andreas Kleineberg, which re-examined the information provided by Ptolemy, located the place through mathematical calculations in the area of today's Jena in Thuringia.
