= Lange Berge =

Mountain range

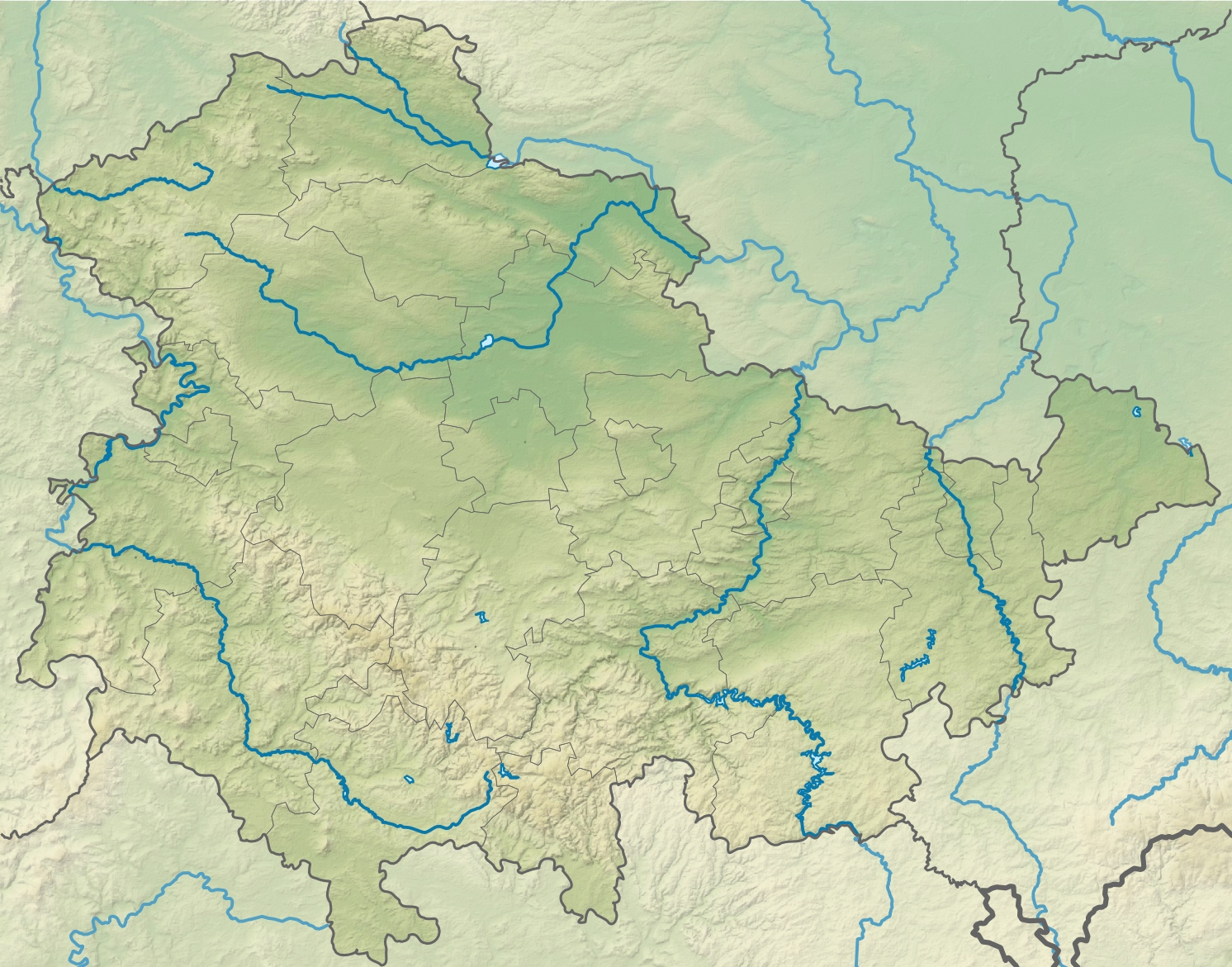
- Location within Bavaria Location within Thuringia

Highest point
- Peak: Buchberg
- Elevation: 527.2 m above NN

Geography
- State(s): Bavaria, Thuringia, Germany
- Range coordinates: 50°21′32″N 10°54′39″E

The Lange Berge ("Long Hills") are a small range of the German Central Uplands, up to 527.2 m above sea level (NN), which lie mainly in the Bavarian provinces of Upper Franconia with northwestern foothills in Thuringia.

== Location ==
The Lange Berge lie on the border between Bavaria and Thuringia in the counties of Coburg and Hildburghausen between Eisfeld on the River Werra to the north, the Lauter valley to the east, Coburg on the Itz to the south and Bad Rodach to the west.

== Hills ==
The highest point of the Lange Berge is the Buchberg (527.2 m) in Bavaria, a barely noticeable eminence on the A 73 motorway between the Sennigshöhe and the motorway junction of Eisfeld-Süd. The highest hills in the range are (heights in metres (m) above Normalnull (NN)):

- Buchberg (527.2 m), Bavaria
- Mirsdorfer Kuppe (525.3 m), Bavaria
- Sennigshöhe (522.8 m), Bavaria
- Walleskuppe (513.5 m), Thuringian/Bavarian border
- Hohe Wart (504.8 m), Thuringia
- Jägersberg (491.4 m), Bavaria
- Ottenberg (487.4 m), Bavaria
- Hildburghausener Höhe (461.6 m), Bavaria
