= Oppidum Steinsburg =

Coordinates: 50.412091°N 10.592884°E

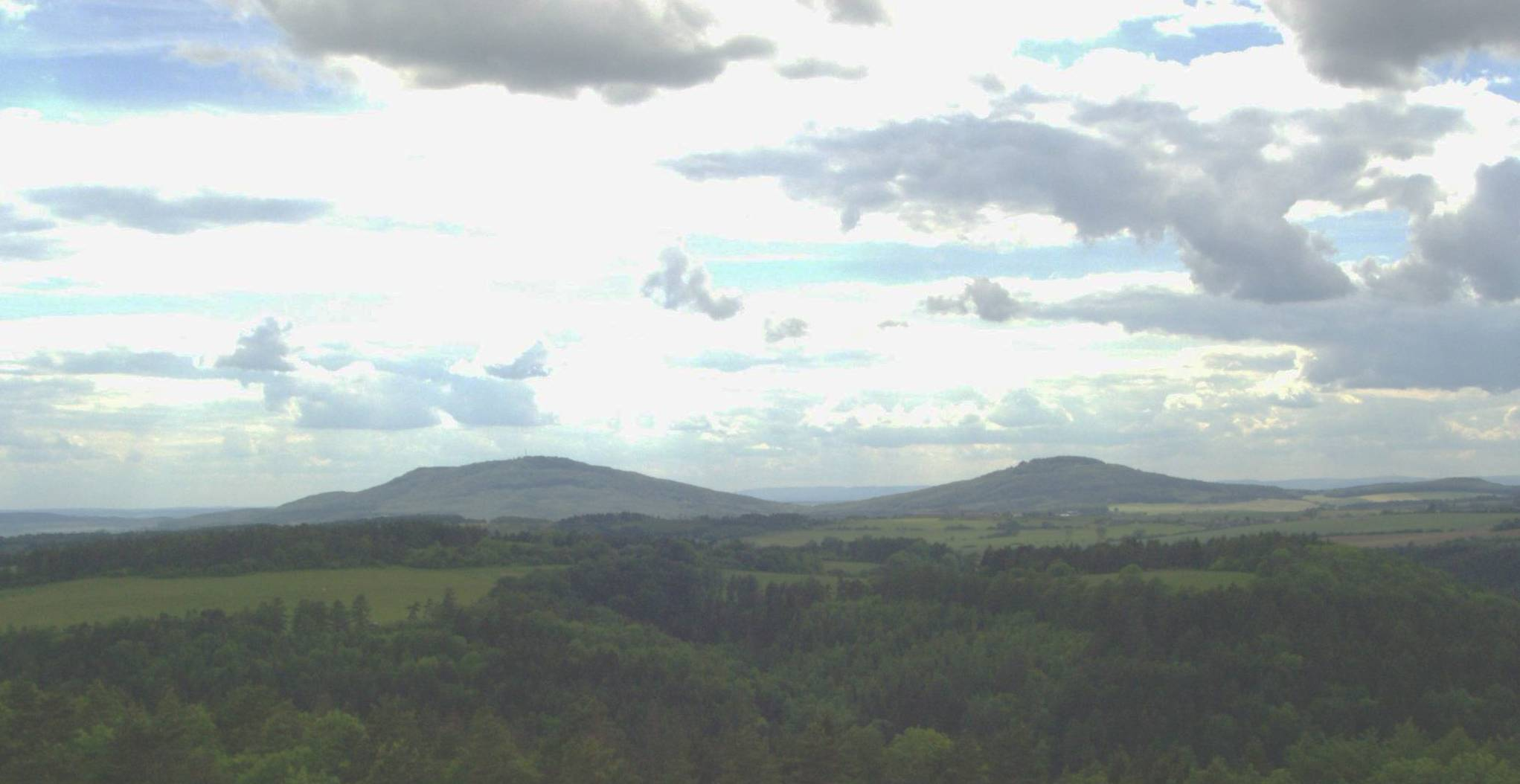
The Großer and Kleiner Gleichberg

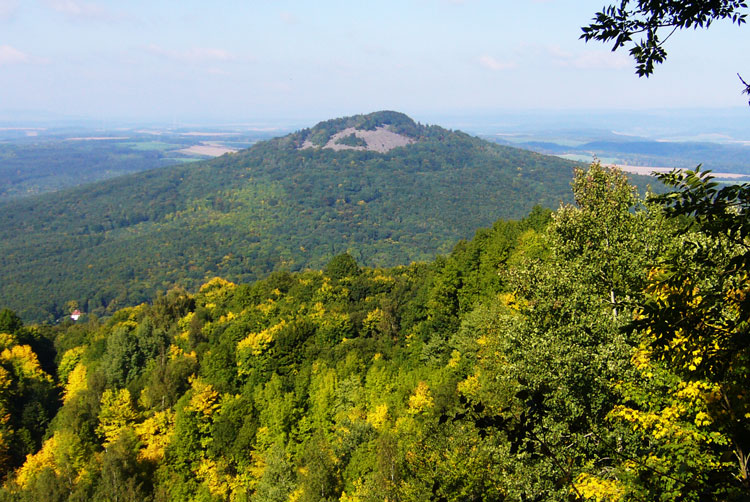
View of the Kleiner Gleichberg

Steinsburg is the colloquial name for the remains of a Celtic oppidum on the Kleiner Gleichberg in South Thuringia, the southern region of the German state Thuringia. It is located within the county of Hildburghausen by Waldhaus near the small town of Römhild.

The Kleiner Gleichberg (641 m) and the neighbouring Großer Gleichberg (679 m) form a pair of "geological twins". Both mountains are basalt cones which are volcanic in origin. The name Steinsburg (867: Steinberg) ("stone castle") probably derives from the large stone fields that surround the mountain summit plateau. Johann Wolfgang von Goethe recognised the volcanic origin of these stone fields: the basalt of the former volcanic pipe crumbled as a result of erosion to form the blockfields visible today that are a typical indicator of collapsed volcano structures. These basalt blocks were used in Celtic times for the construction of dry stone walls that probably protected the oppidum. A total of three rings of walls were built surround the mountain like city walls. The outermost wall is three kilometres long and encloses an area of 66 hectares. Only a few short sections of these walls have been partially preserved, but the collapsed sections enable the old structure to be made out.

In clearing large parts of the stone field for roadbuilding (from 1838), metal objects and other artefacts were discovered that were later recognised as of Celtic origin. The increasing amount of basalt quarrying from 1858 destroyed parts of the hillfort, especially the easily accessible lower wall rings, and brought a huge quantity of archaeological finds to the surface, of which mainly the metal objects have survived in various collections. On the initiative of Alfred Götze, the quarrying was stopped between 1902 and 1927. In 1929 the Steinsburg Museum was built on the saddle between the Großer and Kleiner Gleichberg and this is where the majority of finds are still on display today. The Gleichberge are thought by several researchers to the same place mentioned in the Geography of Ptolemy as the settlement of Bicurgium. In the specialist and local history literature, the names Kleiner Gleichberg and Steinsburg are both used to refer to the hillfort.

The widespread destruction has led to the uncovering of an unusually high number of finds, especially metal objects. However, often the location and connexion of the finds was not noted. In addition, the older finds include very few items of pottery, because pieces of old ceramic vessels were not looked after in the 19th century. Excavations were carried out as early as 1874 by a Romhild doctor. In the early 20th century systematic excavations were carried out by prehistorian, Alfred Götze. In recent times several of the surviving fortification remains have been conserved, but in some cases had to be dismantled and re-assembled.

== Gallery ==
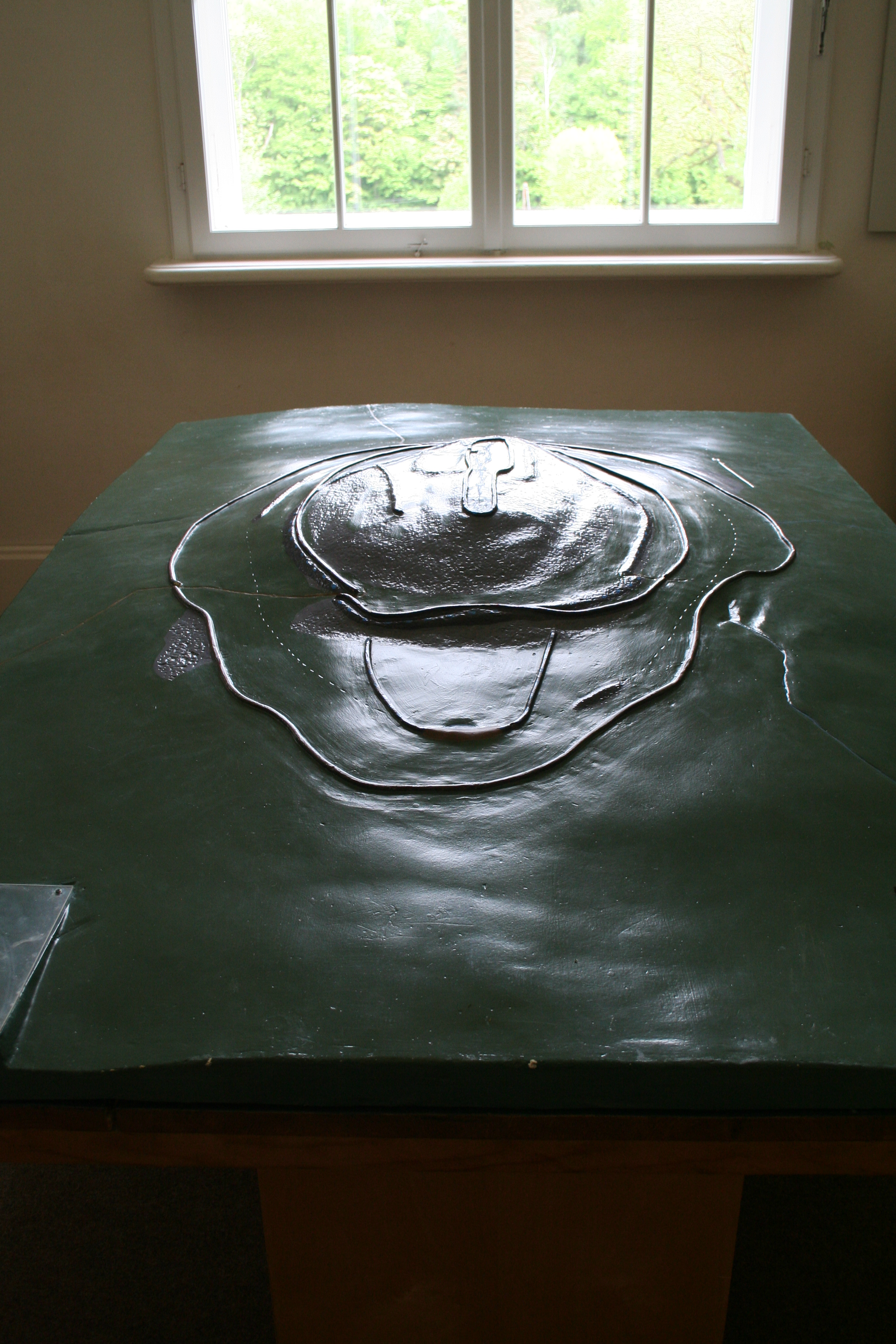
Model of the Steinsburg hillfort at the Steinsburg Museum

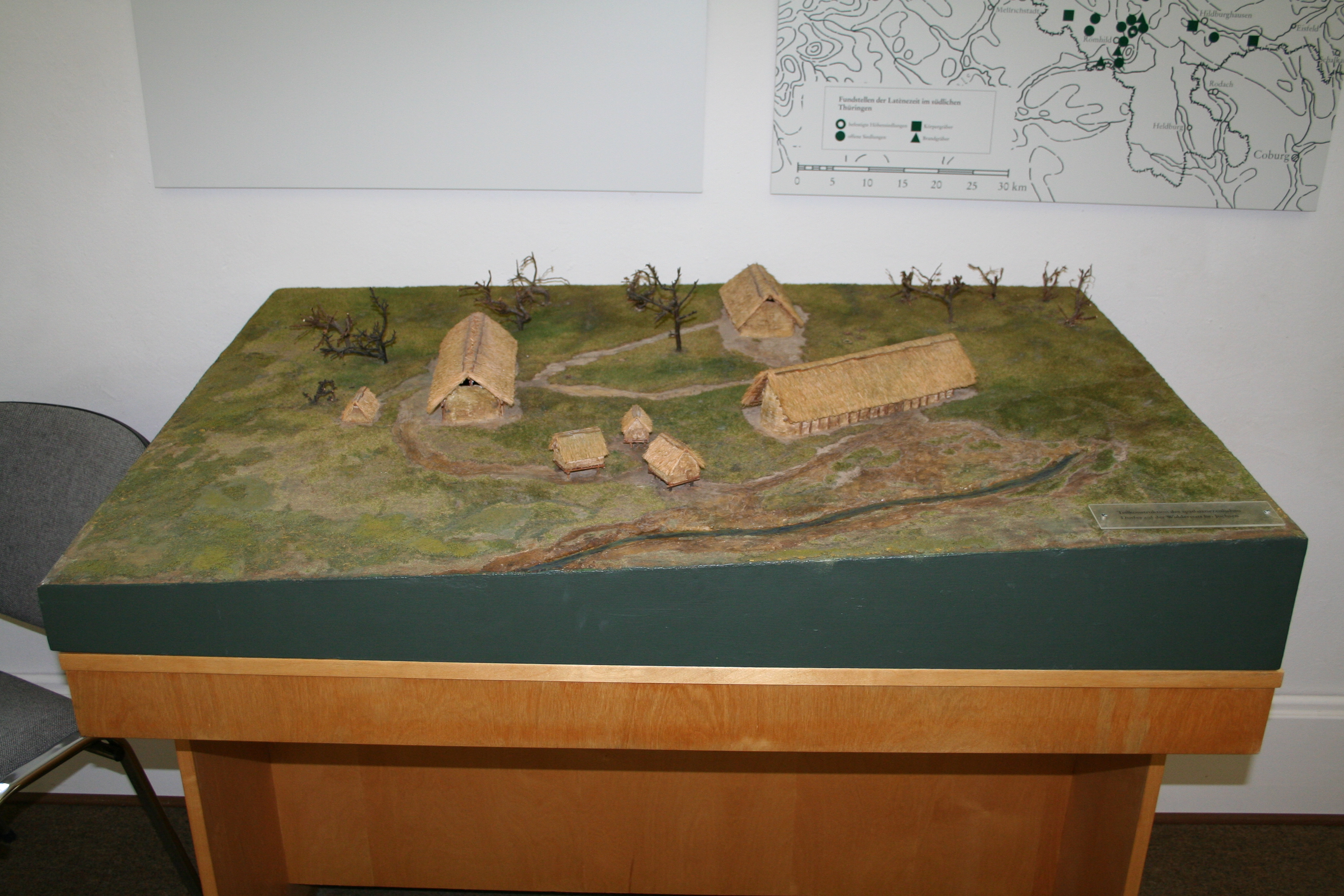
Model of Celtic buildings at the Steinsburg

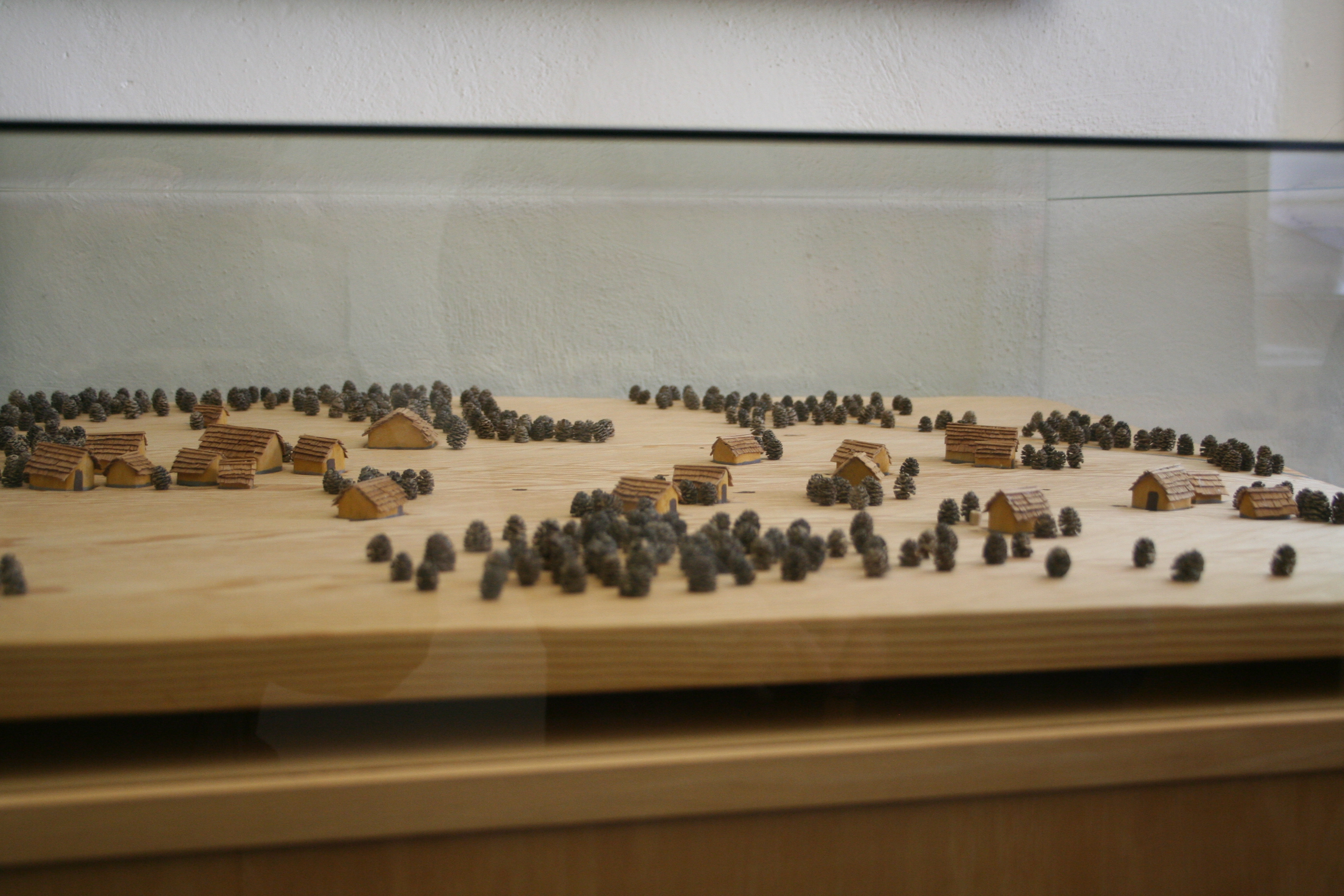
Model of Celtic buildings at the Steinsburg

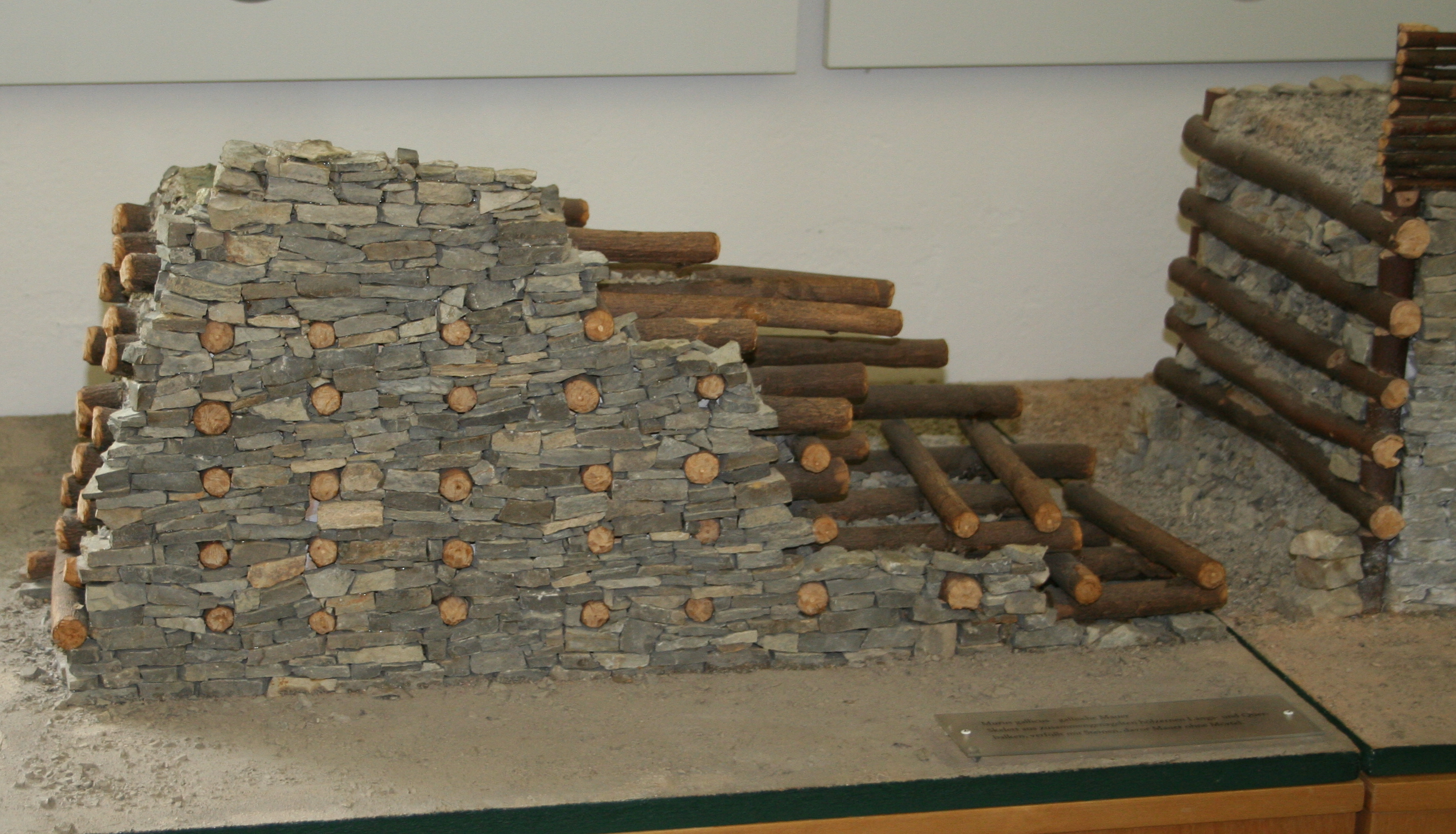
Model of a murus gallicus at the Steinsburg

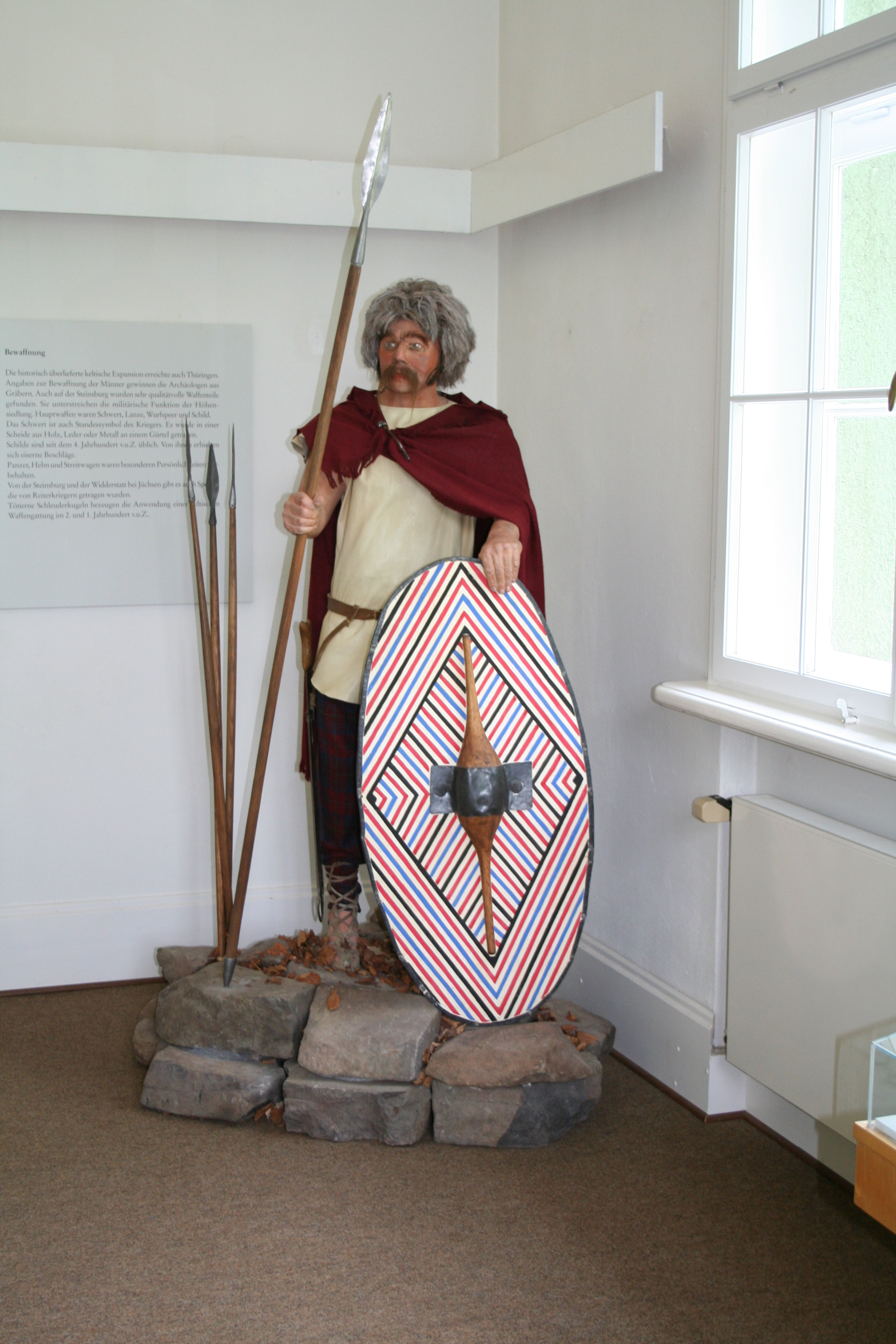
Reconstruction of a Celtic man, Steinsburg museum

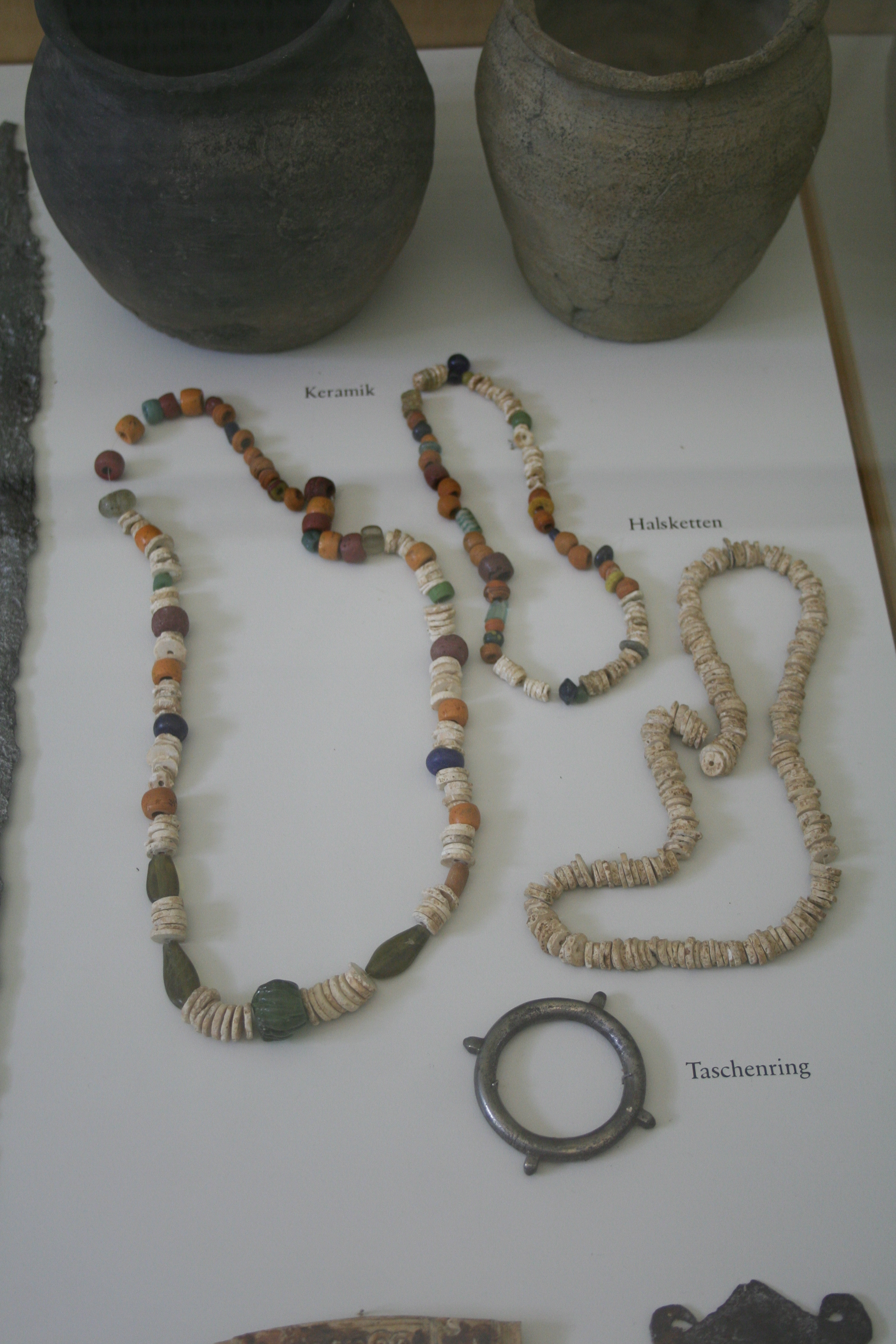
Celtic artefacts from the Steinsburg

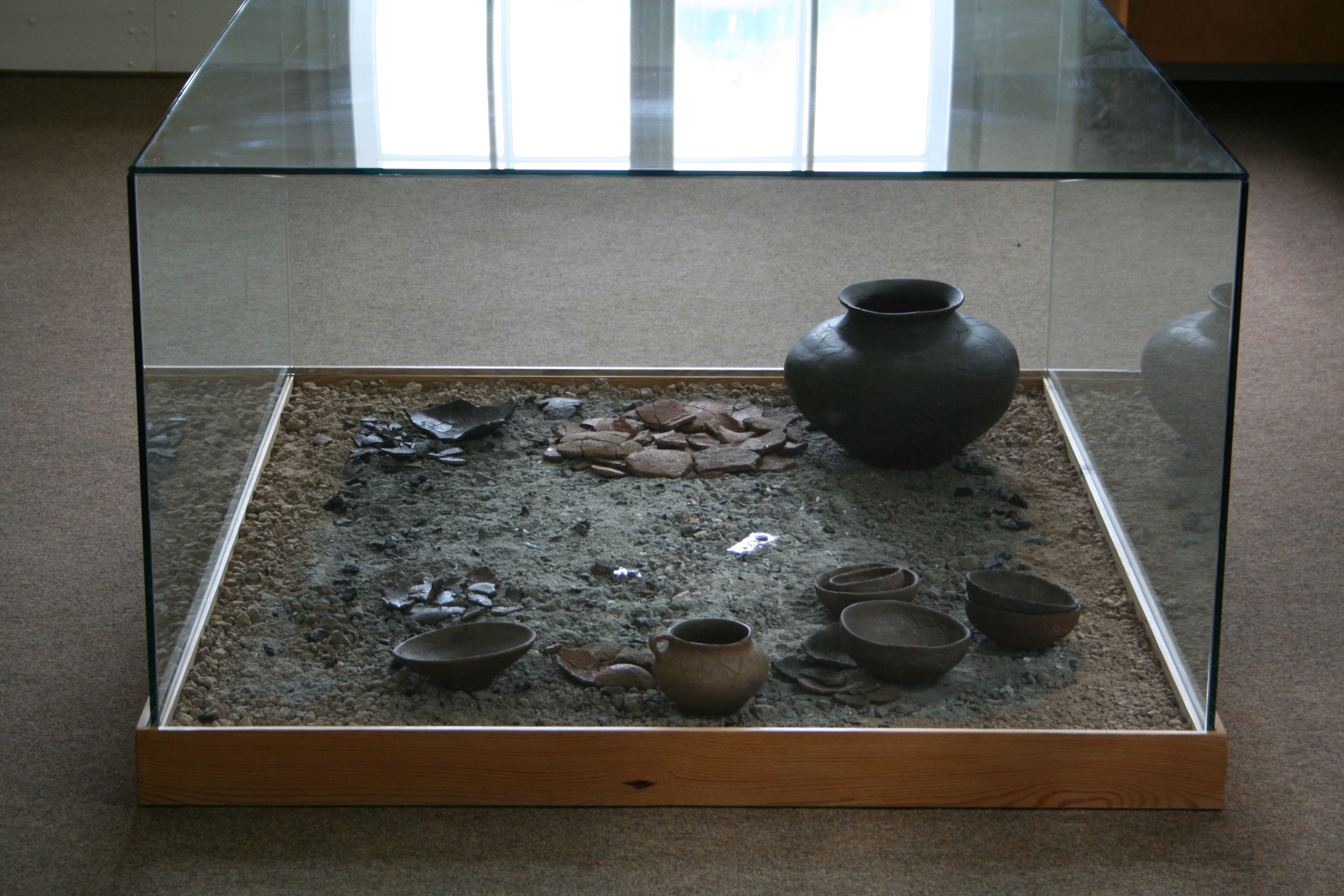
Burial with pottery

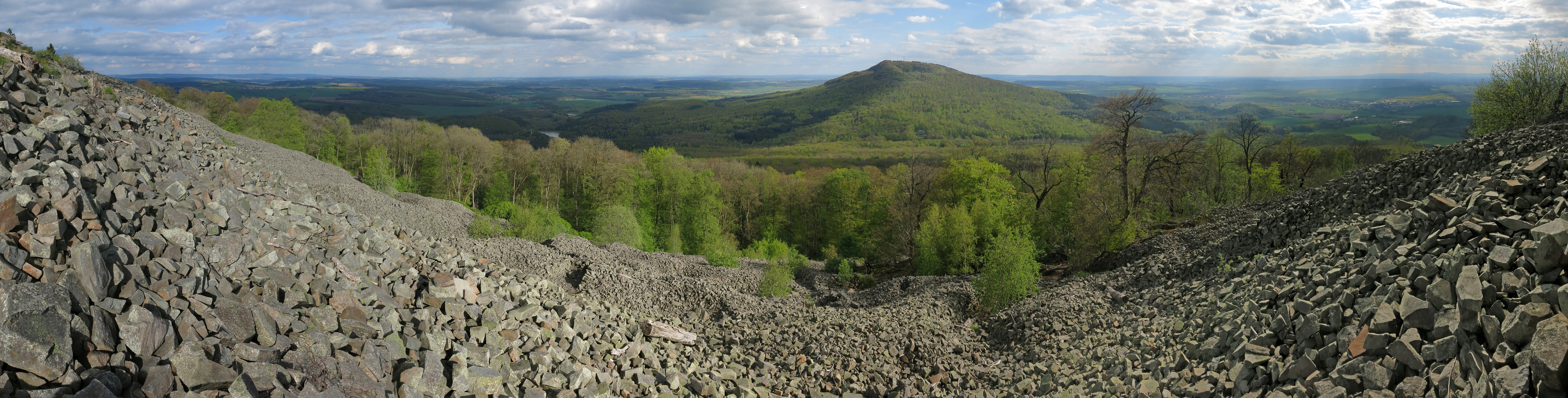
View from the Kleiner Gleichberg

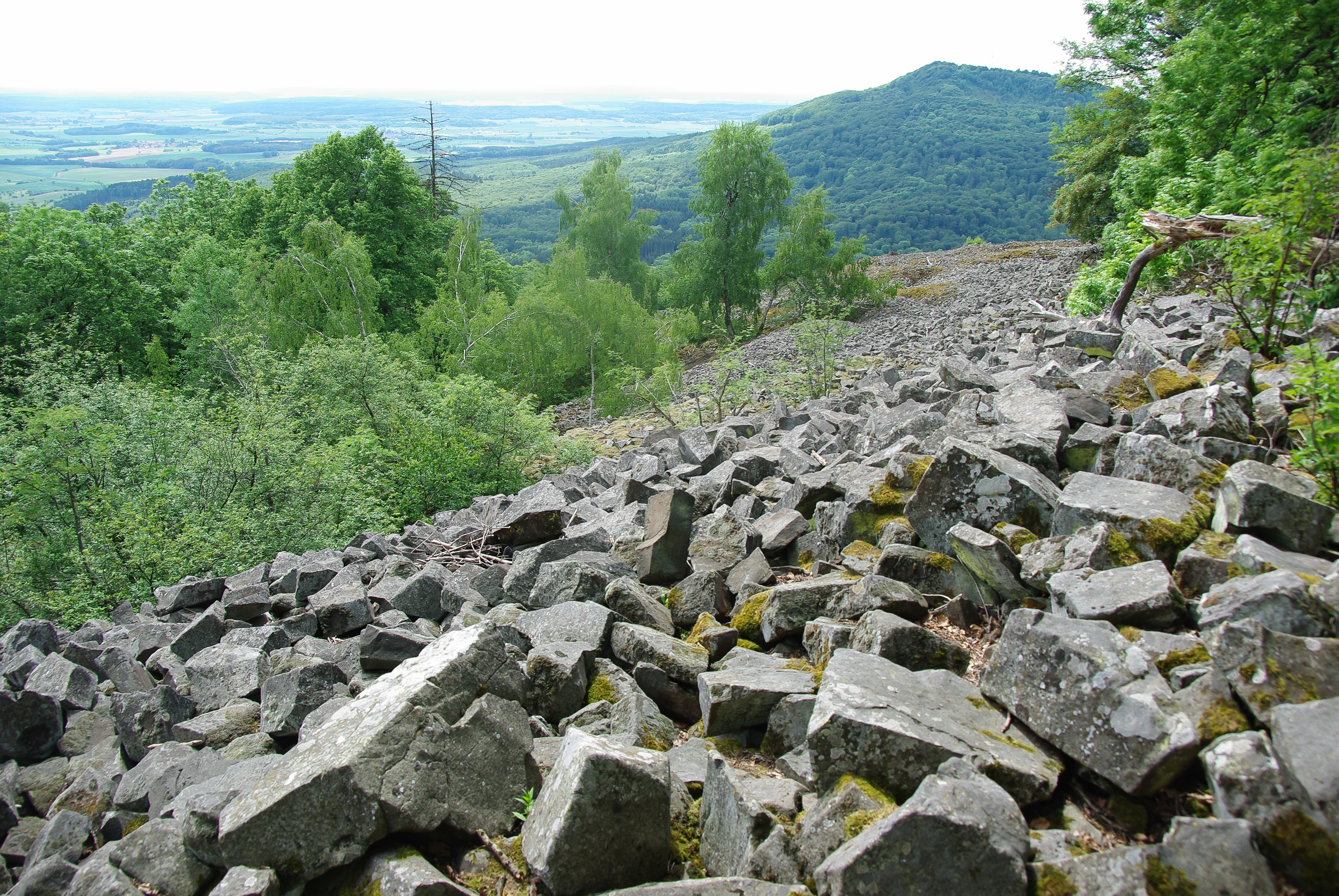
Remains of stone ramparts on the Kleiner Gleichberg

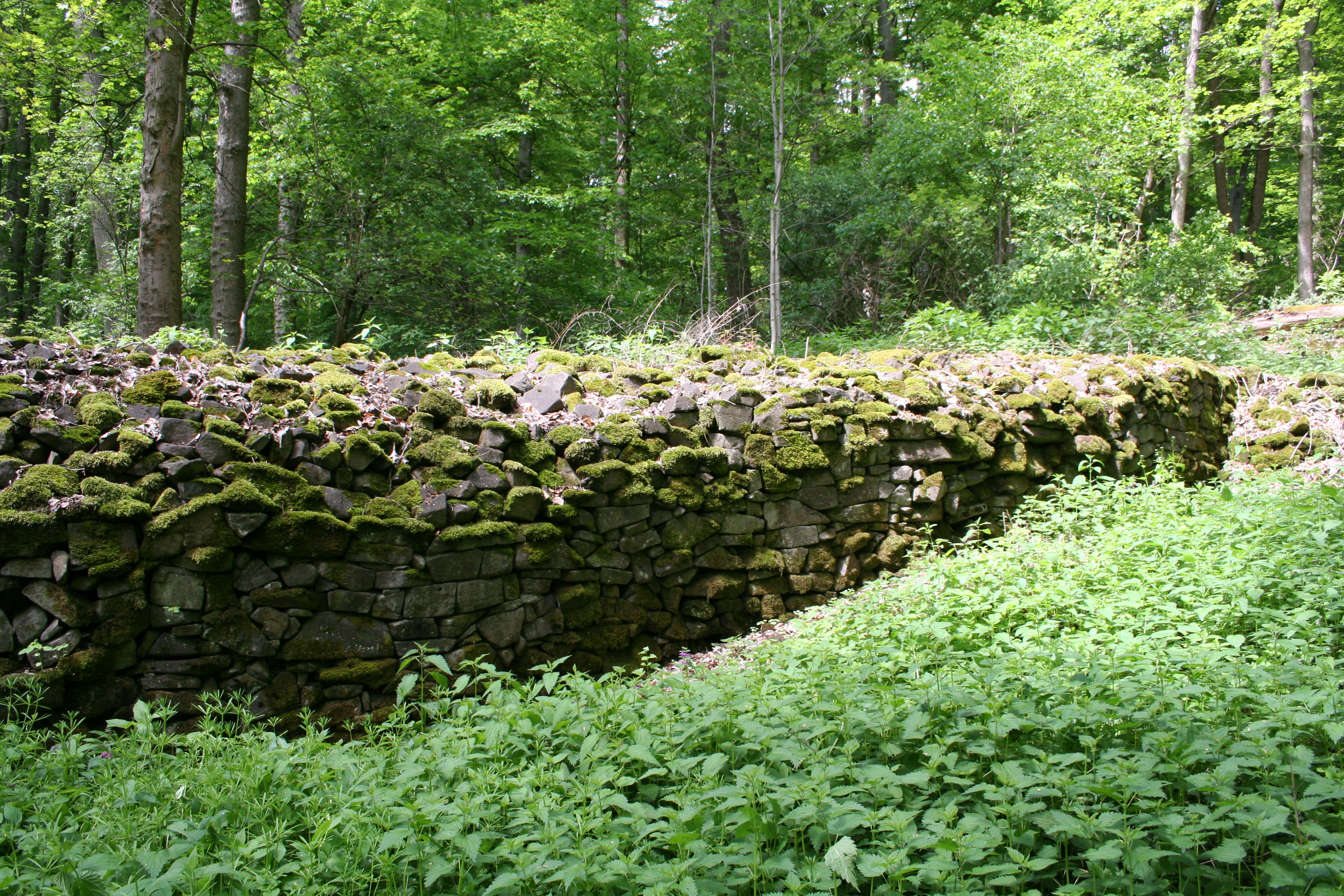
Remains of a wall on the Kleiner Gleichberg

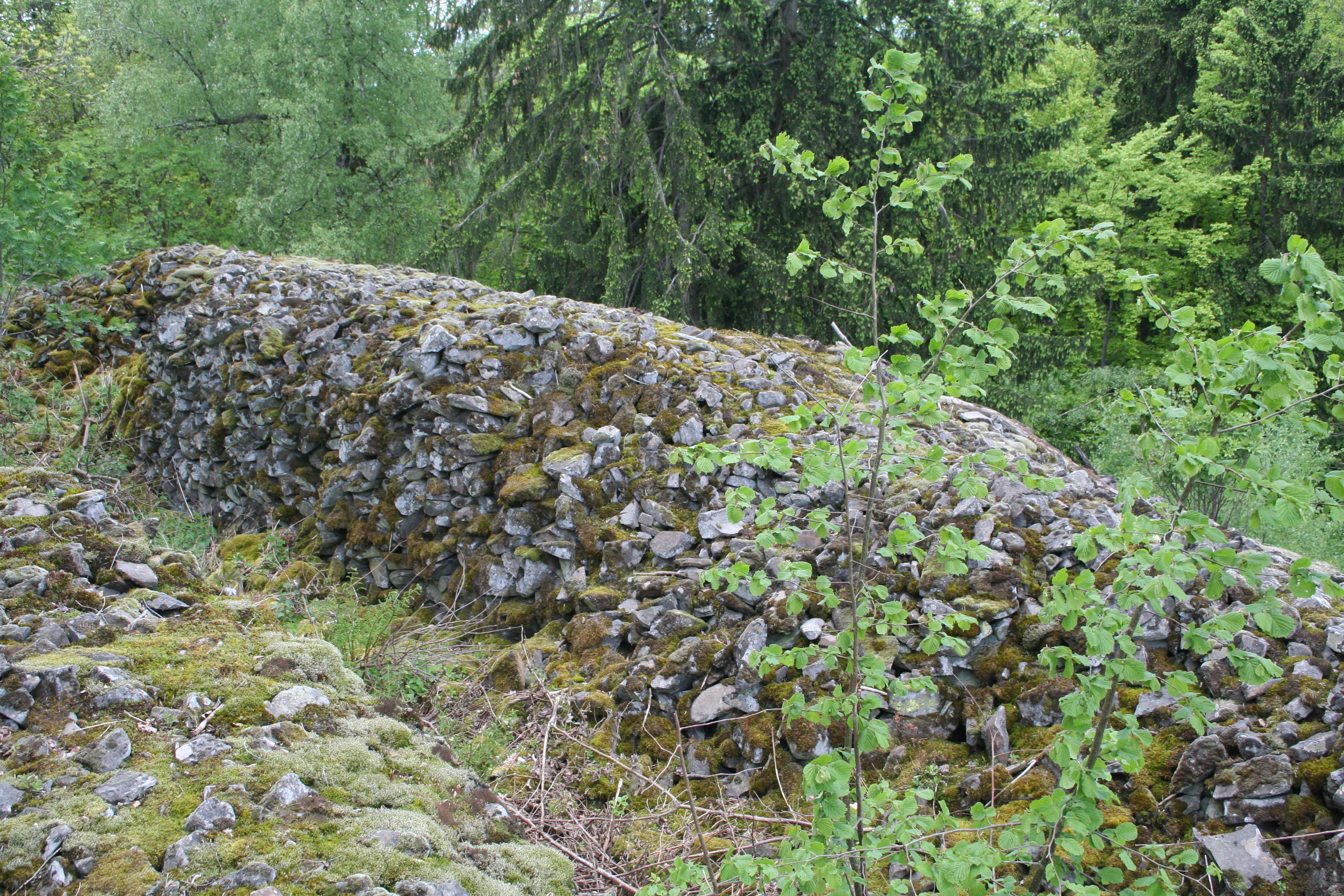
Remains of a wall on the Kleiner Gleichberg

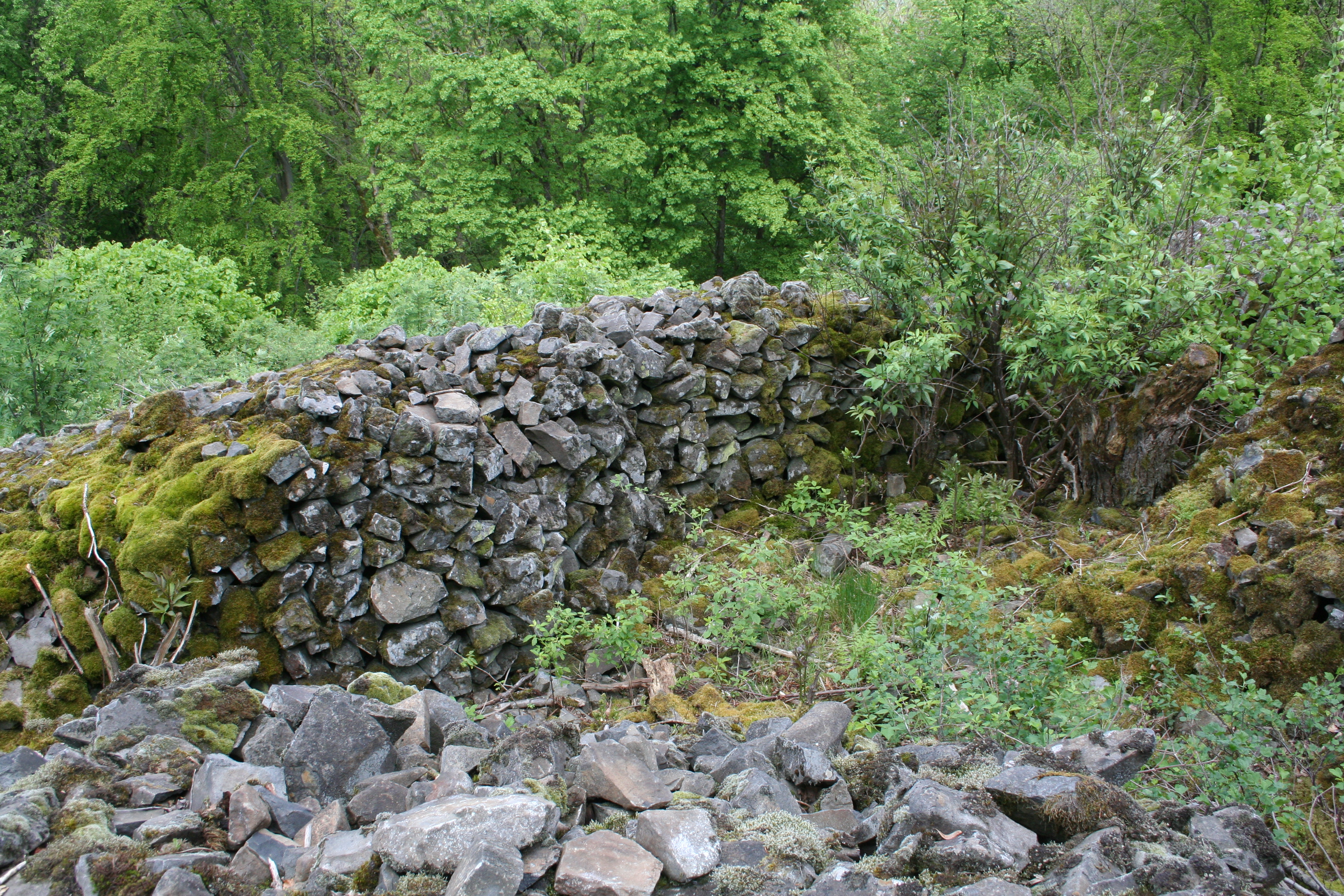
Stone ruins

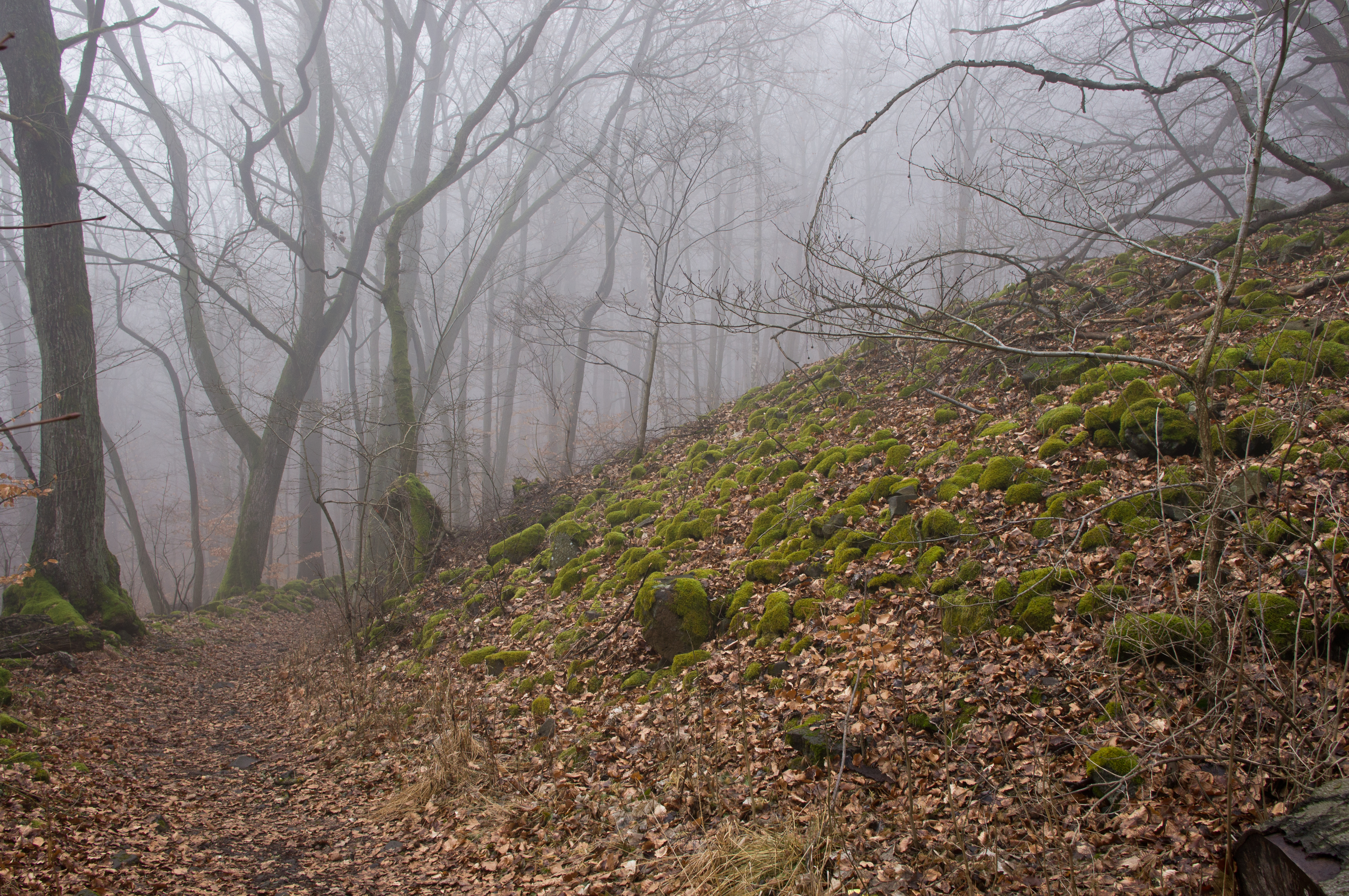
Rampart remains around the settled area of the Steinsburg

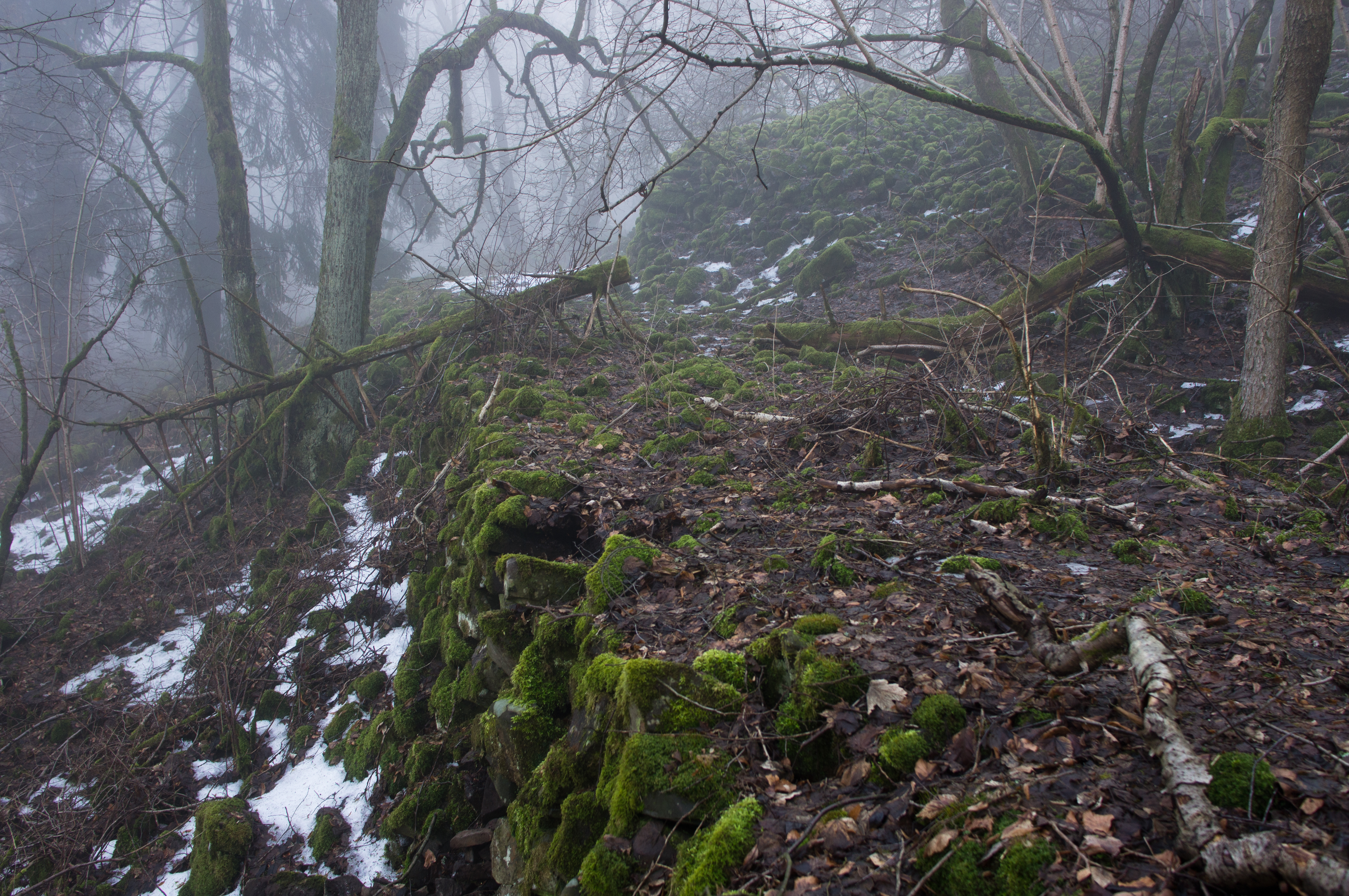
Western rampart around the settled area of the Steinsburg

== See also ==
- La Tène culture
- Hallstatt culture

== Literature ==
- Reinhard Spehr (1980), Archäologische Topographie der Steinsburg bei Römhild : (Kleine Schriften des Landesmuseums für Vorgeschichte 1) (in German), Dresden
- Werner Gall; Thomas Grasselt (c. 1994), Archäologischer Wanderweg im Gleichberggebiet : (Faltblatt Thür. Landesamt f. Denkmalpflege and Archäologie) (in German), Weimar: Gutenberg-Druck
- Karl Peschel (1962), Die vorgeschichtliche Keramik der Gleichberge bei Römhild in Thüringen : (Veröffentlichungen des vorgeschichtlichen Museums der Friedrich-Schiller-Universität Jena 1) (in German), Weimar: Hermann Böhlaus Nachfolger
