= Grabfeld =

Region in Germany on the border of Bavaria and Thuringia

Coordinates: 50.35°N 10.45°E

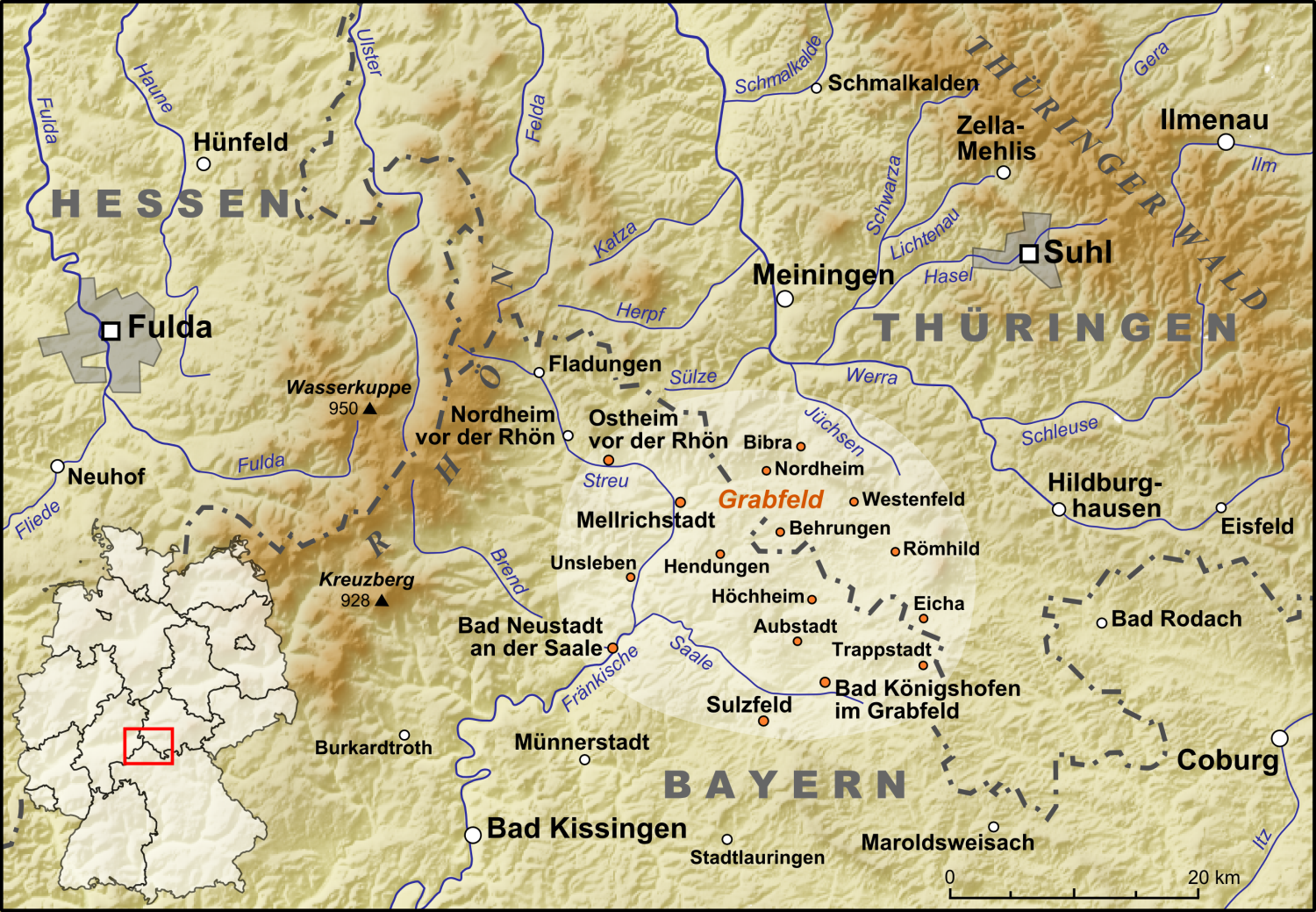
Map showing Grabfeld on an overlay of Hesse, Thuringia and Bavaria.

The Grabfeld (German pronunciation: [ˈɡʁaːpˌfɛlt]) is a region in Germany, on the border between Bavaria and Thuringia. It is situated southeast of the Rhön Mountains. Its highest elevation is 679 metres high in the little Gleichberge mountain range. The Grabfeld gave its name to the Bavarian district of Rhön-Grabfeld and the Thuringian municipality of Grabfeld.

Grabfeld is also the source of the Franconian Saale, a tributary of the Main River.
