= Heurich =

Heurich is a surname. Notable people with the surname include:

- Christian Heurich (1842–1945), Washington DC's most dominant brewer
- Winfried Heurich (born 1940), German organist and composer

See also

- Christian Heurich Brewing Company, is a beer brewing company in Washington, D.C., United States
- Heurich House Museum, is a Gilded Age mansion in the Dupont Circle neighborhood of Washington D.C., United States
- Heurich Mausoleum, is a public artwork by sculptor Louis Amateis, located at Rock Creek Cemetery in Washington, D.C., United States
- Heurich-Parks House, house in Washington, D.C., United States. Listed on the National Register of Historic Places
