= Gleichberge (Verwaltungsgemeinschaft) =

Coordinates: 50.400°N 10.550°E

Gleichberge was a Verwaltungsgemeinschaft ("collective municipality") in the district of Hildburghausen, in Thuringia, Germany. It was disbanded on 31 December 2012. The seat of the Verwaltungsgemeinschaft was in Römhild.

== Municipalities ==
The Verwaltungsgemeinschaft Gleichberge consisted of the following municipalities:

1. Haina
2. Mendhausen
3. Milz
4. Römhild
5. Westenfeld
