= Heurich-Parks House =

- U.S. National Register of Historic Places
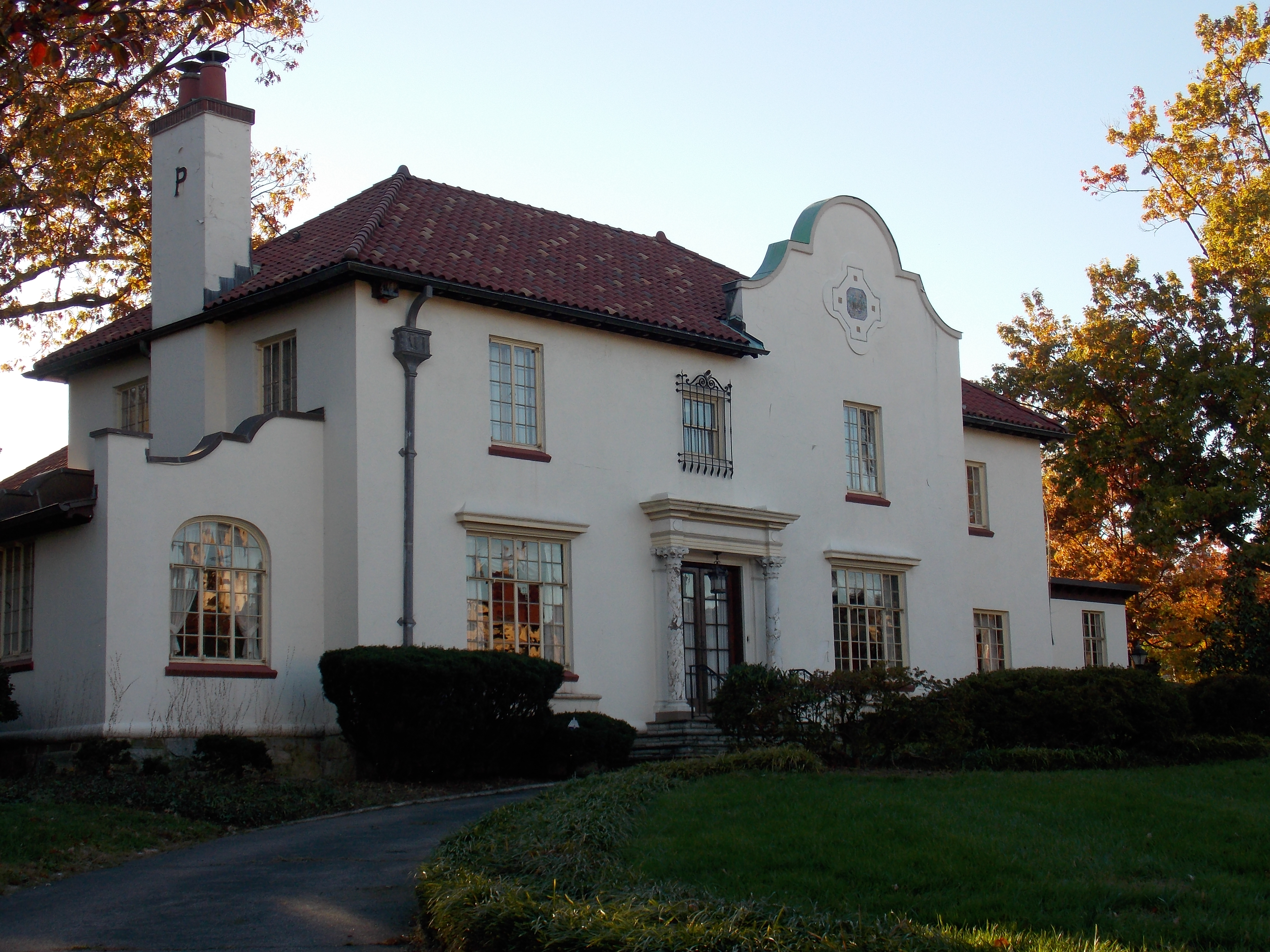
- Heurich-Parks House in 2015

- Location within Washington, D.C. Location within the District of Columbia Location within the United States
- Location: 3400 Massachusetts Ave., NW. Washington, D.C.
- Coordinates: 38.9244°N 77.0681°W
- Area: .39 acres (0.16 ha)
- Built: 1925
- Architect: Albert S. J. Atkinson; H.F. Huber & Company; Porter & Lockie
- Architectural style: Century Revival-Mission/Spanish
- NRHP reference No.: 15000719
- Added to NRHP: October 13, 2015

The Heurich-Parks House at 3400 Massachusetts Avenue on Observatory Circle, Washington, D.C., was built in 1925 by philanthropic businessman Christian Heurich, Jr. The home was sold to ophthalmologist Marshall M. Parks in 1960. On October 13, 2015, the house was listed on the National Register of Historic Places.

== Christian Heurich, Jr. ==
Christian "Chris" Heurich, Jr. (1901–1979) was the heir to the Christian Heurich Brewing Company in Washington D. C. He married Consuelo Young in 1925, and that year William H. and Mary M. West sold Heurich Lots 9 and 10, 3400 Massachusetts Avenue on Observatory Circle, Washington, D.C.

A two-story brick, tile, and stucco, L-plan residence was designed by architect Albert S.J. Atkinson, and may have been decorated by the New York firm of H.F. Huber & Company, the same firm that designed the interiors of the Heurich mansion in Dupont Circle that was built from 1892–1894 by his father, Christian Heurich. The National Park Service estimates the cost of the original construction for the Century Revival-Mission/Spanish style architecture house to have been $30,000. A two-story expansion designed by Porter & Lockie was added in 1938, and constructed by William P. Lipscomb and Company. The expansion included a rectangular terrace. Fred Drew Construction Company strengthened the foundation of a portion of the house with underpinning in 1941, and a two-story “servants quarters” was added in 1948 by the same construction company. Chris and Consuelo divorced on September 5, 1951.

== Marshall M. Parks ==
Consuelo Young Heurich sold the house to ophthalmologist Marshall M. Parks (1918–2005) and his wife Angeline Miller Parks on June 27, 1960. Dr. Parks and his wife ran an ophthalmology practice out of the home. In 1960, Parks added a Porter & Lockie–designed wing on the house to accommodate his practice.

== NRHP listing ==
The house was added to the NRHP in western Washington, D.C., on October 13, 2015.

== See also ==
- Christian Heurich Mansion
