= Christian Heurich =

German-born American brewer and investor

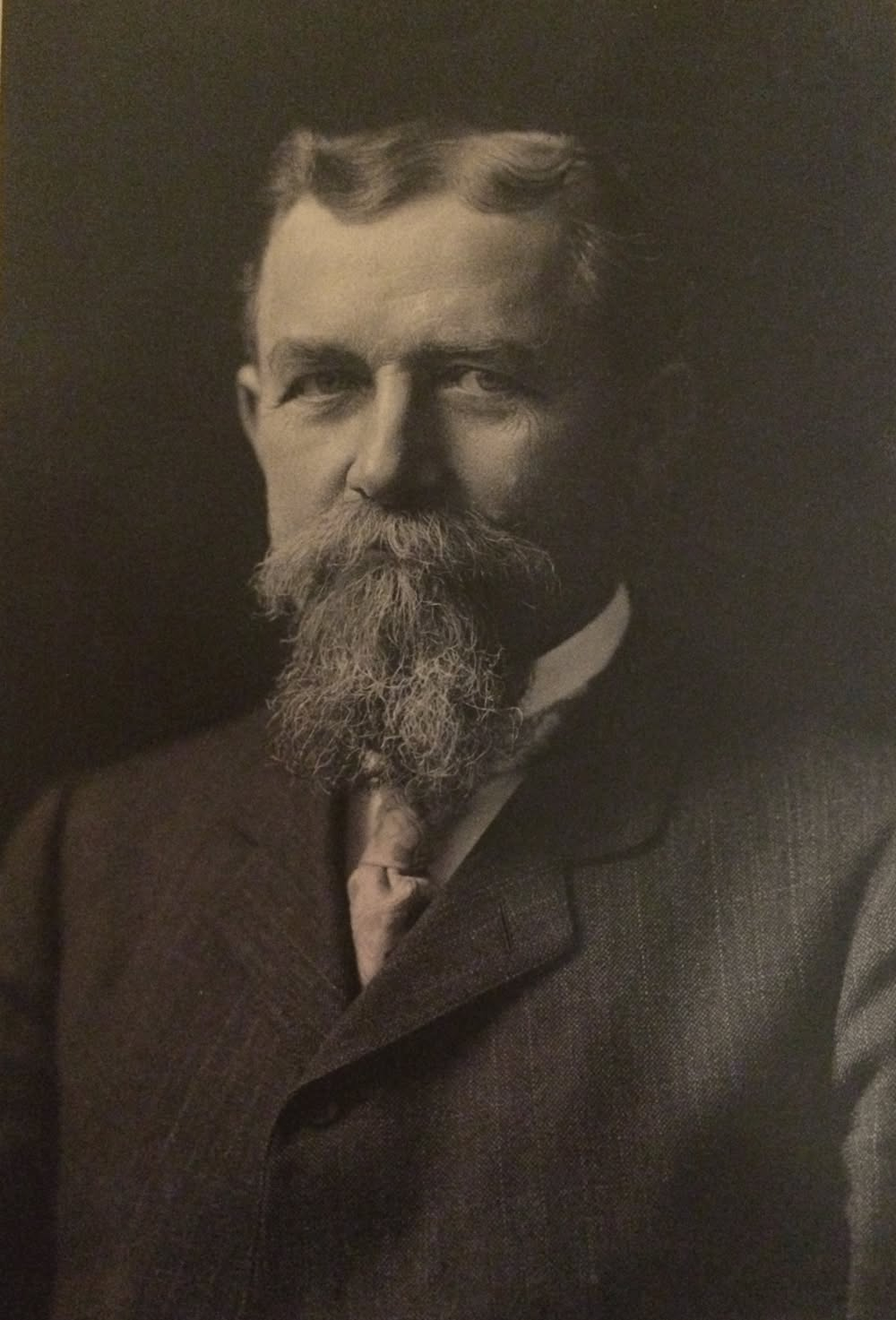
- Born: Christian Ferdinand Heurich; September 12, 1842; Haina, Duchy of Saxe-Meiningen, German Confederation
- Died: March 7, 1945 (aged 102); Washington, D.C., U.S.
- Resting place: Heurich Mausoleum, Rock Creek Cemetery, Washington, D.C., U.S.
- Occupations: brewer; real estate investor
- Known for: founder of Christian Heurich Brewing Company
- Spouses: Amelia Mueller Schnell (m. 1873; died 1884) Mathilde Daetz (m. 1887; died 1895) Amelia Louise Keyser (m. 1899)
- Children: 4

Christian Heurich (September 12, 1842 – March 7, 1945) was an American brewer and real estate investor in Washington, D.C. His company, Christian Heurich Brewing Company, established in 1872, was the largest brewery in Washington, D.C. At one point, Heurich owned more land than any other landowner in Washington, D.C., except the federal government.

== Early life ==
Christian Ferdinand Heurich was born on September 12, 1842, in the village of Haina, near the town of Römhild, Duchy of Saxe-Meiningen (in the region of Thuringia), Christian was the third of four children born to Kaspar and Anna Margarethe (née Fuchs) Heurich. At the age of 12, Heurich moved with his parents to Römhild. Christian's father was the local innkeeper, which included being a butcher and brewer. Christian learned the trade from his father and several apprenticeships in his youth. By the time Christian was fourteen years old, both of his parents had died, leaving him orphaned. Heurich apprenticed in Themar between 1857 and 1859. He traveled throughout Europe until his older sister, Elizabeth Jacobsen, who was living in Baltimore, Maryland, convinced him to emigrate to the United States, where he would have a better chance of fulfilling his dream of starting his own brewery; he arrived in June 1866, initially joining his sister in Baltimore.

== Career ==
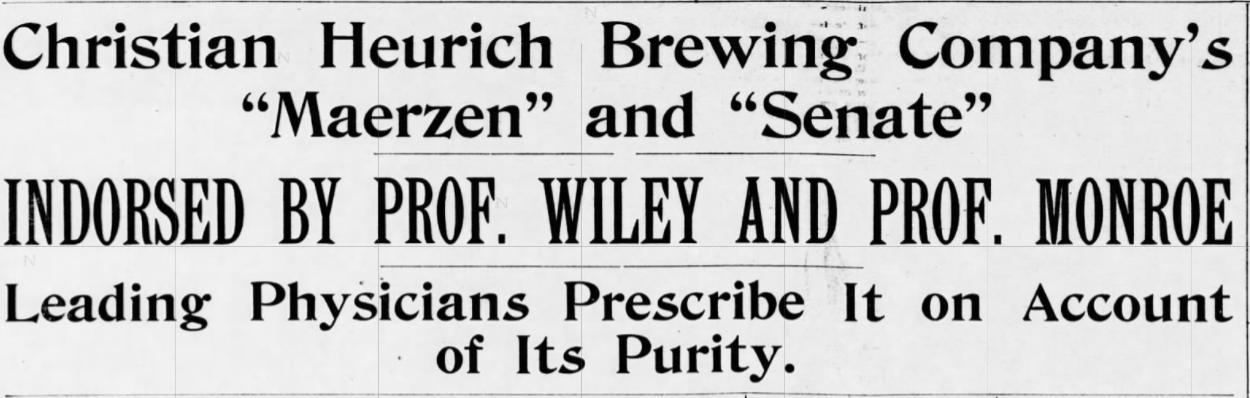
Evening Star endorsement of the "purity" of Heurich's beers in May 1901

As a young man, Heurich learned how to make lager beer in Bavaria and Vienna, Austria. After moving to the United States, Heurich worked in a brewery in Baltimore. He then moved to Chicago, Illinois, to work at Seipp & Lehman (later Conrad Seipp Brewing Company). For a time, he lived in Topeka, Kansas. In 1868/1869, Heurich moved back to Baltimore and worked on a sailing vessel. Heurich then moved to Ripley, Ohio, and worked for a brewery there until it was sold to a firm in Cincinnati. He then moved back to Baltimore to become a foreman in a brewery.

=== Christian Heurich Brewing Company ===
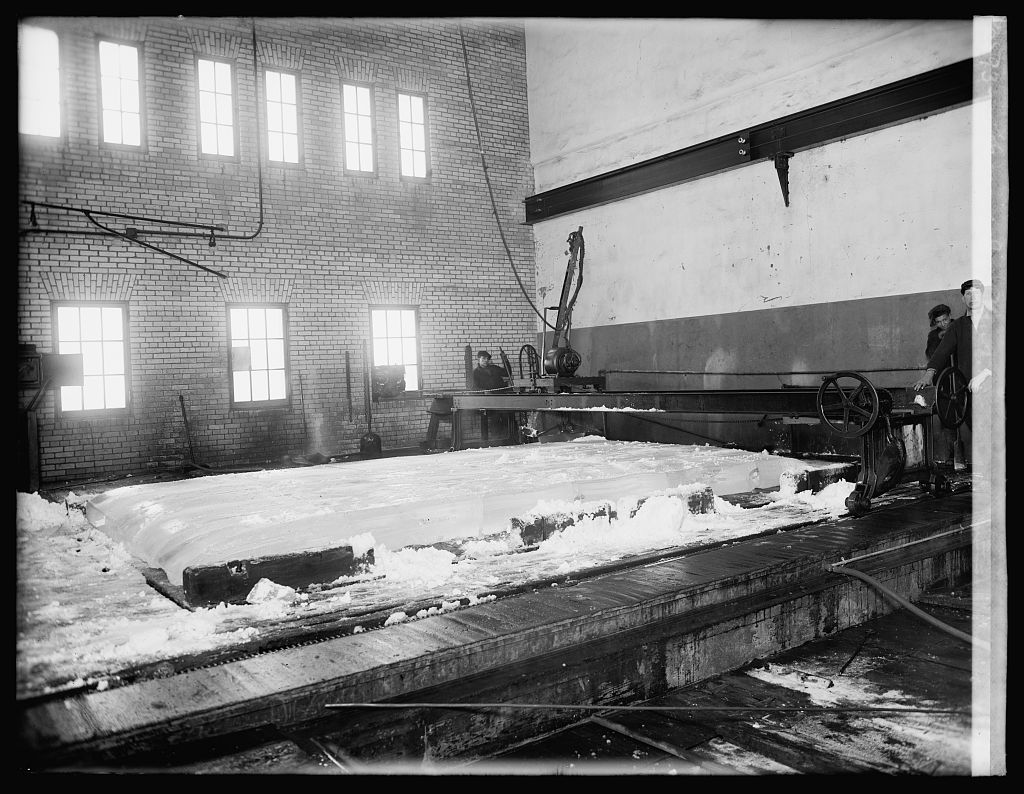
Heurich's ice plant in Washington, D.C. (1920)

In 1872, Heurich partnered with Paul Ritter, an employee of Seeger Brewery in Baltimore. Together, they leased a brewery from George Schnell at 1229 20th Street NW, Washington, D.C. Within a year, Mr. Schnell died, and the partnership between the two men dissolved. Heurich bought Ritter's share in 1873 and started a business of his own. He named the new company Christian Heurich's Lager Beer Brewery. He expanded the plant from 1223 to 1235 20th Street NW. As of 1878, the annual capacity was 30,000 barrels.

Heurich would incorporate the business in 1890 as the Christian Heurich Brewing Company. In his 1934 autobiography, Aus meinem Leben, Heurich writes that he was the one who did most of the labor of brewing while Schnell entertained customers. In 1877 and 1878, he built a second brewery on 20th Street NW. In 1891, Heurich's beer was investigated by the U.S. Department of Agriculture for impurities. The chemical analysis proved a lack of impurities in the company's beer, and Heurich had the analysis published in local newspapers. The Heurich Brewing Company would later follow this commercial success with testimonials in newspapers from physicians prescribing the beer "on account of its purity". In its history, the Brewing Company would suffer three fires: a chimney fire in 1875, two fires in the horse stable owned by the company (one caused by smoking), and an explosion in the malt mill that caused the company to build a new facility in Foggy Bottom on Water Street at 26th and D Streets.

In 1896 he opened his new, fireproof brewery, which had a capacity for 500,000 barrels of beer a year. It was one of the first fireproof buildings in the city. The brewery, which rested on the Potomac River, is now the site of the Kennedy Center for the Performing Arts and part of the approach of the Theodore Roosevelt Bridge. The brewery was the second largest employer in Washington D.C. during this time, apart from the federal government. By 1897, Heurich had expanded his brewing enterprises to Norfolk, Virginia. The brewery would close in 1919 due to Prohibition, and the company would focus its operations on ice production. They resumed beer production in 1933 after the repeal of prohibition, and they stopped producing ice in 1940. Heurich would continue working at the brewery until his death. The brewery would close down in 1956.

=== Real estate investments ===
Heurich invested heavily in real estate in Washington, D.C. As of 1889, Heurich had real estate holdings in Washington, D.C. valued at US$239,981 (equivalent to $8,599,319 in 2025). By 1903, his holdings increased to a valuation of US$563,906 (equivalent to $20,206,632 in 2025). In 1910, Heurich purchased the Randolph Hotel.

== Personal life ==
Heurich married the widow of Schnell, Amelia (née Mueller) Schnell of Washington, D.C., on September 9, 1873. In 1884, Amelia died of pneumonia. On February 1, 1887, Christian married for the second time to Mathilde Daetz, an emigrant from Bremervörde, Germany. Due to a miscarriage and a carriage accident, Mathilde died in 1895, leaving Christian a widower again. On January 11, 1899, Christian married Amelia Louise Keyser, the niece and namesake of his first wife. He was more than twenty years her senior, and together they had four children, three of whom survived into adulthood: Christian Heurich Jr., Anna Marguerite (who died as an infant), Anita Augusta, and Karla Louise. They remained married until his death. Christian Heurich Jr. would continue running the brewery after his father's death and would also work as a real estate investor.

From around 1873 to 1888, Heurich lived at 1229 20th St NW. Around 1888, he moved to 1218 19th St NW where he would remain until 1894/1895. In 1886, Heurich purchased a tract of land near Hyattsville, Maryland, and part of Brookland neighborhood. He turned it into a dairy farm and named it "Bellevue Farm". Heurich bred Holstein Friesian cattle at Bellevue and would receive prizes for his cattle.

In 1894, Heurich had the Christian Heurich Mansion built on 1307 New Hampshire Avenue NW. It is a 31-room Victorian built to resemble the German castles in which his parents worked. His second wife, Mathilde, worked very closely with the interior designers of the house, The Huber Brothers, NYC. The mansion was built with fireproof materials. He also built two houses in Massachusetts Heights for his children, including the Heurich-Parks House.

== Later life and death ==
Heurich was a member of the Association of Oldest Inhabitants, a society in Washington, D.C.

Heurich died of bronchitis on March 7, 1945, at the age of 102. He was buried at the Heurich Mausoleum, which he originally had made for his family near Hyattsville, but resides in Rock Creek Cemetery.

== Awards and legacy ==
Heurich won a silver award at the Paris Exposition in 1900, and his beers won awards at the Liège International in 1905 and the Jamestown Exposition in 1907. He was elected a trustee of the United States Brewers' Association in 1904. In 1912, he would become the first honorary citizen of Römhild and was subsequently elected an honorary member of the Red Cross at Haina.

Though Heurich's brewery would shut down in 1956, his grandson would resurrect the brand as the Olde Heurich Brewing Company in Utica, New York, in 1986, but it would ultimately shut down too in 2006.

The Christian Heurich Mansion was donated to the Historical Society of Washington in 1956. It housed the historical society until 2003. Afterward, it became a museum.

== See also ==
- Christian Heurich Mansion
- Christian Heurich Brewing Company
