= Heurich House Museum =

Historic house in Washington, D.C., United States

- Christian Heurich Mansion
- U.S. National Register of Historic Places
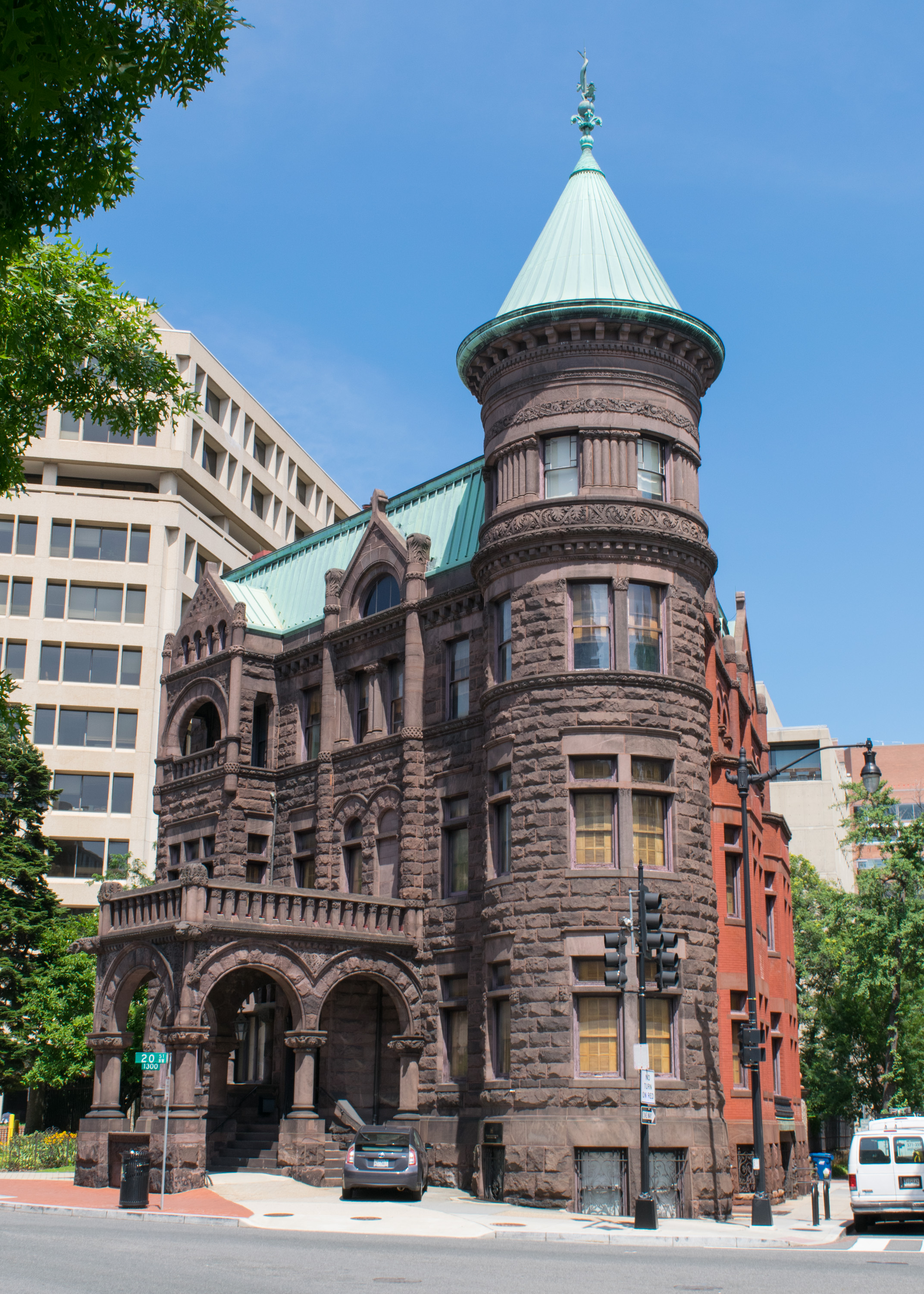

- Location within Central Washington, D.C. Location within the District of Columbia Location within the United States
- Location: 1307 New Hampshire Ave. NW, Washington, D.C.
- Coordinates: 38°54′29″N 77°2′40″W
- Built: 1892
- Architect: John Granville Meyers
- Architectural style: Late Victorian
- NRHP reference No.: 69000296
- Added to NRHP: June 23, 1969

Heurich House Museum, also known as the Christian Heurich Mansion or Brewmaster's Castle, is a Gilded Age mansion in the Dupont Circle neighborhood of Washington D.C.

== History ==
The house was built in 1892–1894 by architect John Granville Meyers for German immigrant and brewer Christian Heurich. The house was also designed with advances features for its time, such as fireproof construction and electricity, which made it one of the most modern residences in Washington, D.C. It is listed on the National Register of Historic Places. The first two floors of the house are preserved, and include most of the original furnishings. In 1956, Heurich's widow deeded the house to the Historical Society of Washington, D.C. In 2003, the Historical Society moved out of the house, putting the house on the open market. Amid rumors of plans to repurpose the house, it was purchased by the Heurich House Foundation and converted into a historic house museum. The museum is open to the public.

== Christian Heurich ==
Born in 1842 in the village of Haina, near the town of Römhild, Duchy of Saxe-Meiningen (in the region of Thuringia), Christian was the third of four children born to Casper and Marguerite (née Fuchs) Heurich. Christian's father was the local innkeeper, which included being a butcher and brewer. Christian learned the trade from his father and several apprenticeships in his youth. By the time Christian was fourteen, both of his parents had died, leaving him orphaned. He traveled throughout Europe until his older sister, Elizabeth Jacobsen, who was living in Baltimore, Maryland, convinced him to emigrate to the United States, where he would have a better chance of fulfilling his dream of starting his own brewery; he arrived in June 1866, initially joining his sister in Baltimore. In 1872, Christian went into a partnership with a man named Paul Ritter. Together, they leased a brewery from George Schnell at 1219 20th Street, NW Washington, D.C. Within a year, Mr. Schnell had died, and the partnership between the two men had dissolved. In his 1934 autobiography, Aus meinem Leben, Heurich writes that he was the one that did most of the labor of brewing while Schnell entertained customers. Christian married the widow of Mr. Schnell, Amelia Mueller Schnell, on September 9, 1873. In 1884, Amelia died of pneumonia.

In 1887, Christian married for the second time to Mathilde Daetz. He built their lavish mansion with Mathilde at 1307 New Hampshire Avenue NW. Mathilde worked very closely with the interior designers of the house, The Huber Brothers of New York City. Sadly, due to a miscarriage and a carriage accident, Mathilde died in 1895, leaving Christian a widower again. Christian threw himself into his work, creating an empire in the capital city. In 1894 he opened his new, fireproof brewery, which had a capacity for 500,000 barrels of beer a year. The brewery, which rested on the Potomac River, is now the site of the Kennedy Center for the Performing Arts. The Christian Heurich Brewing Company was the second largest employer in Washington, D.C., apart from the Federal Government during this time. In 1899, Christian married Amelia Louise Keyser, his first wife's niece, and namesake. Twenty-nine years her senior, together they had four children, three of whom survived into adulthood: Christian Heurich Jr, Anna Marguerite (who died as an infant), Anita Augusta, and Karla Louise. They had a long marriage together until Christian Heurich Sr. died in 1945 at 102.

== Gallery ==
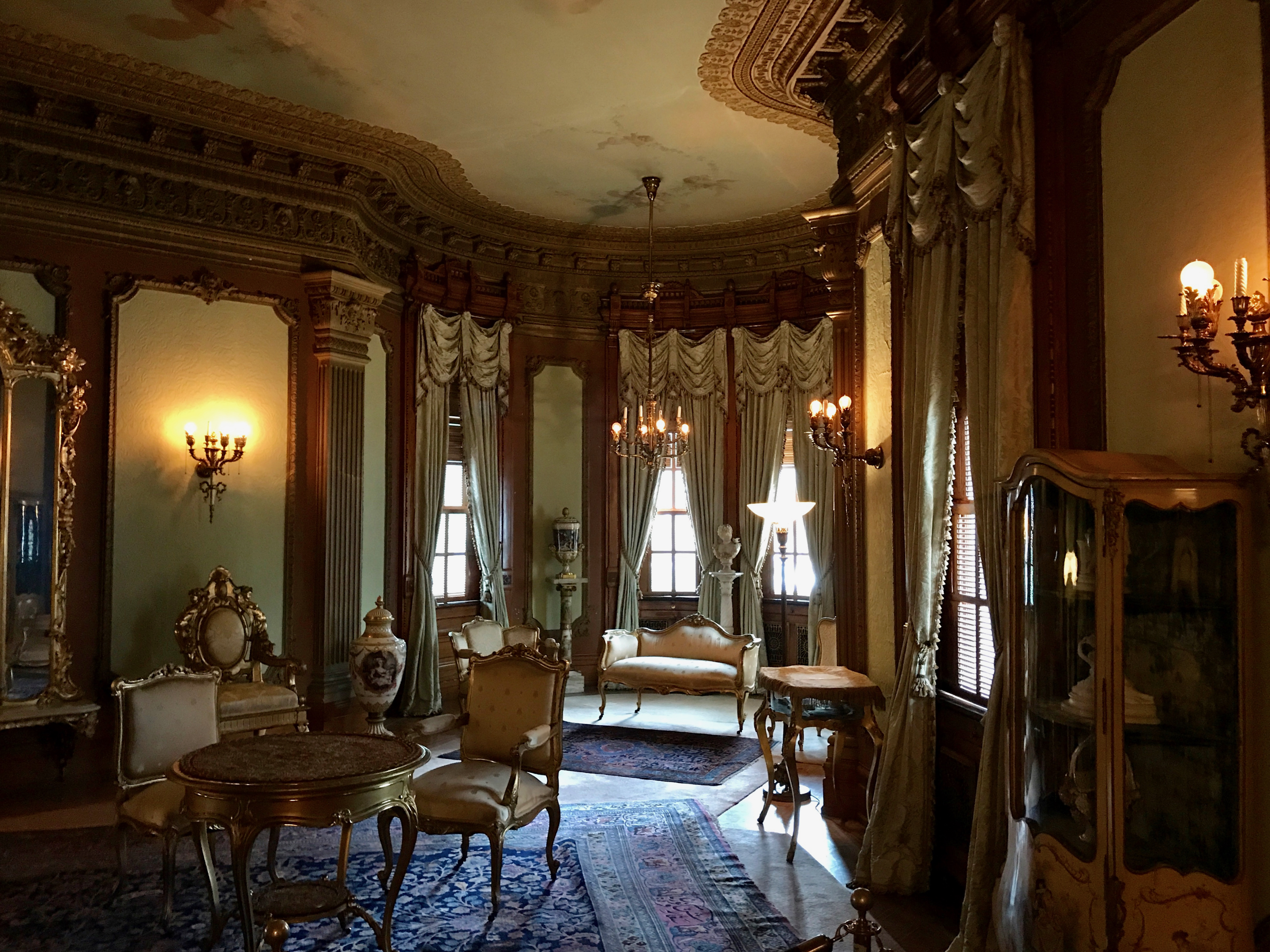
Front parlor

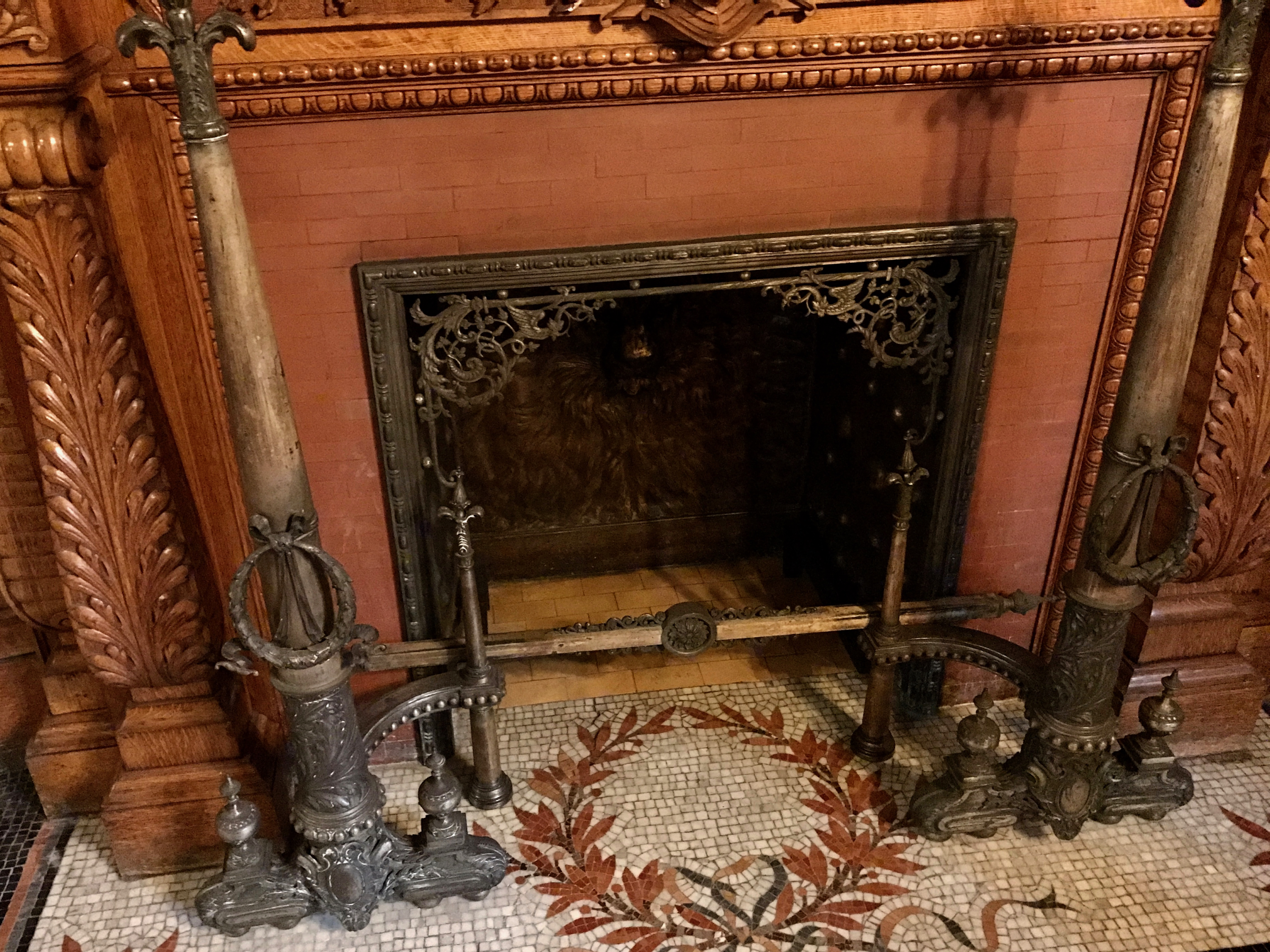
Unused fireplace in the entryway

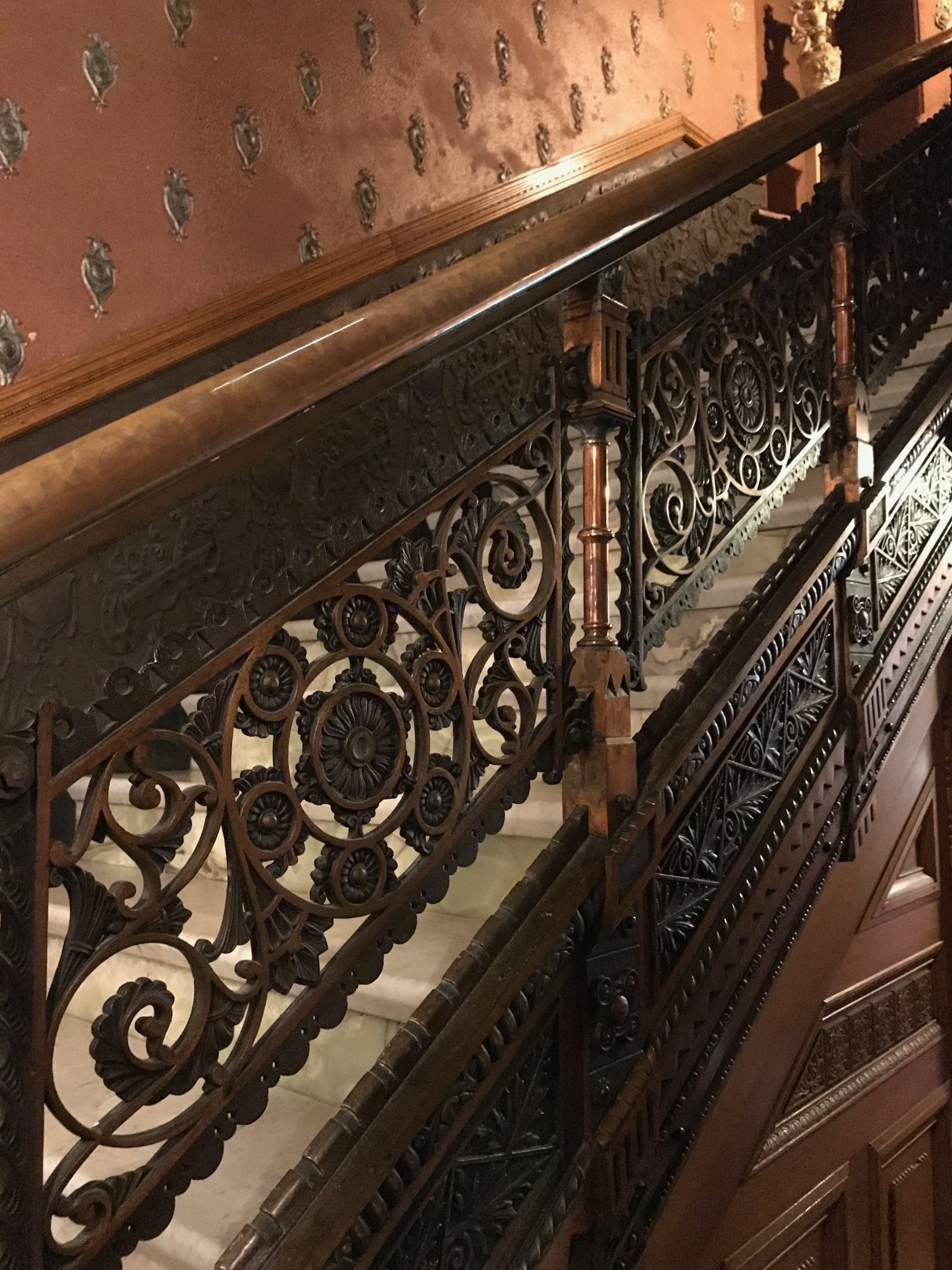
Main stairs

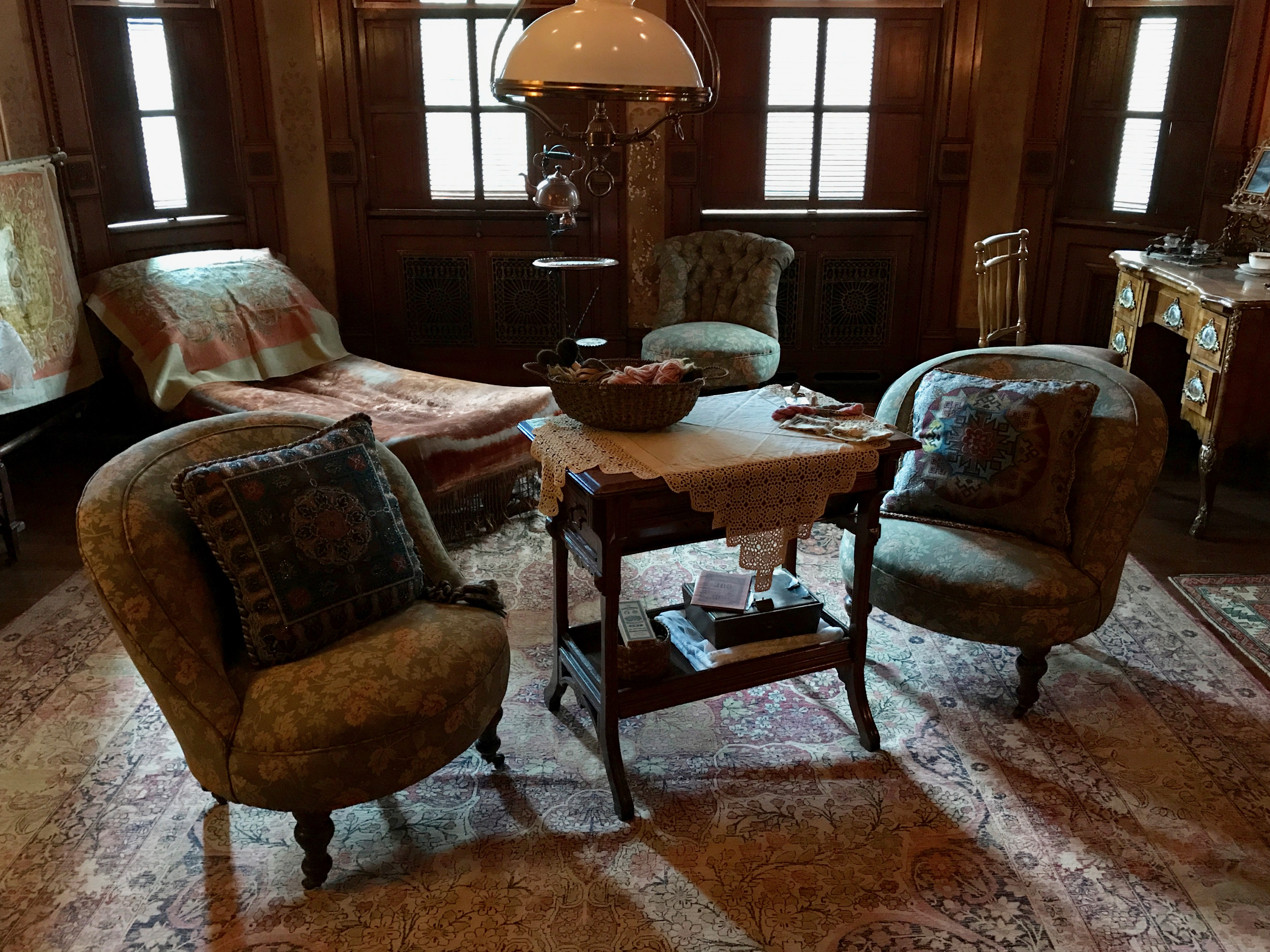
Boudoir

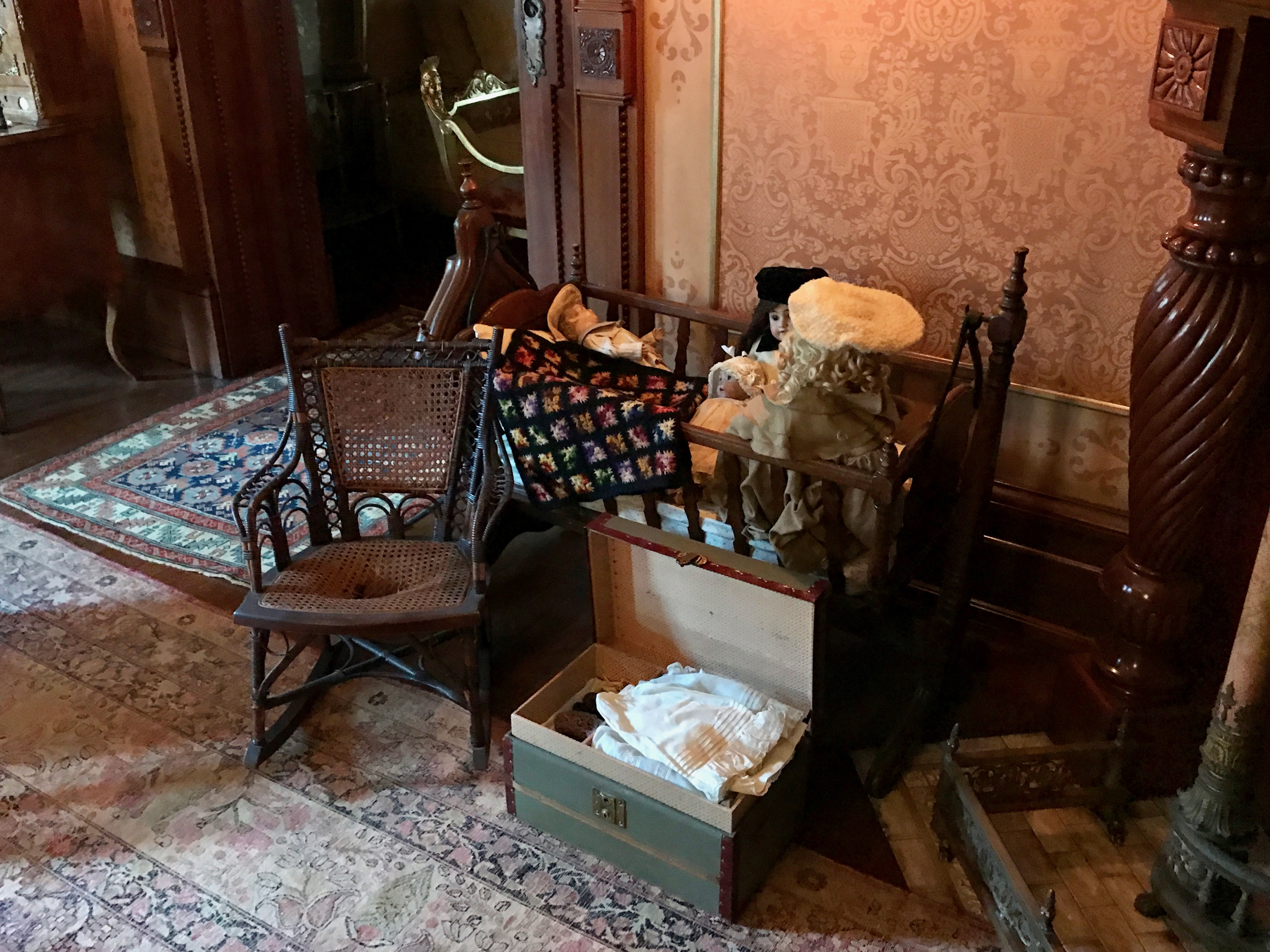
Children's toys in the boudoir

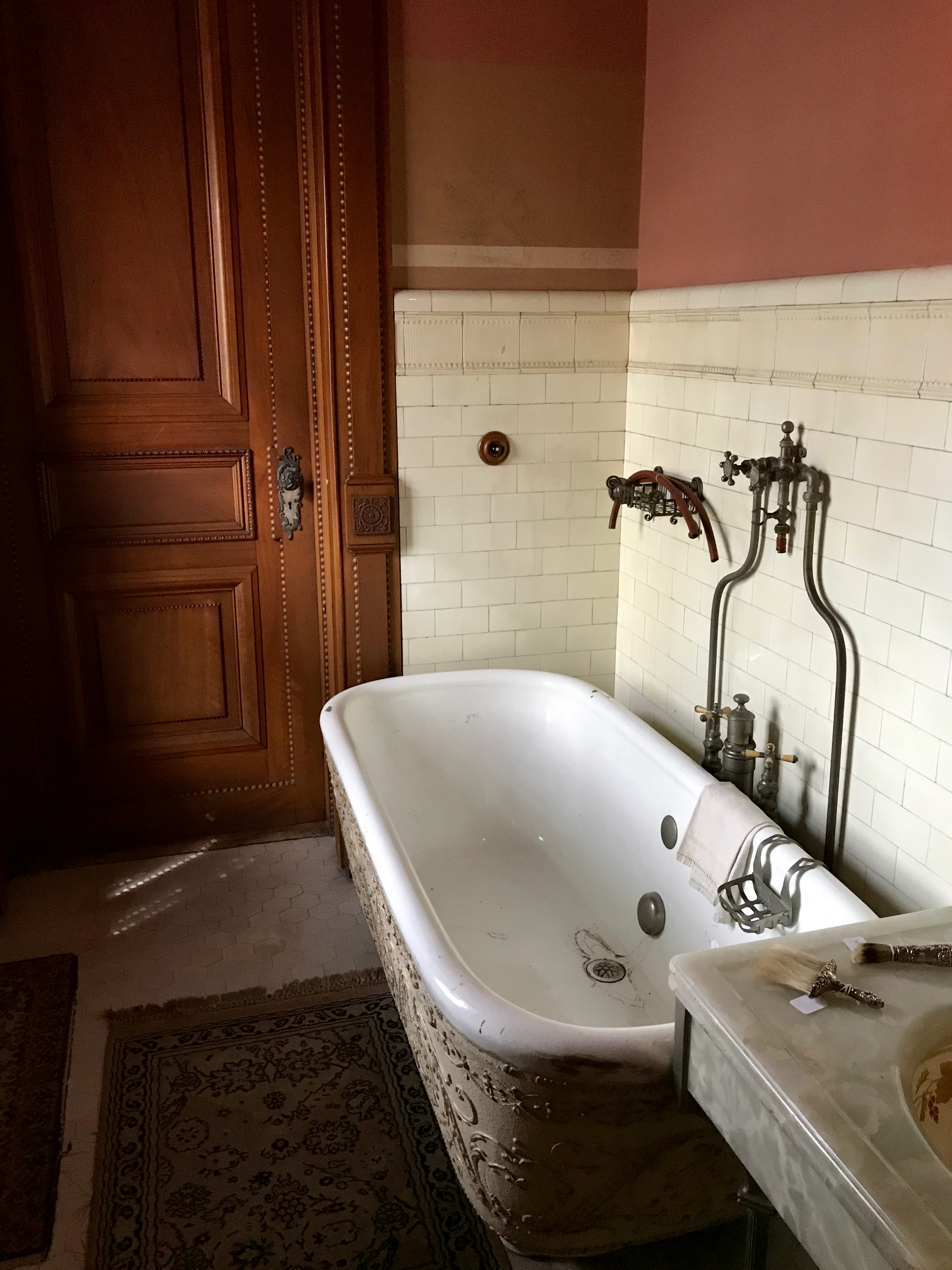
Bathroom

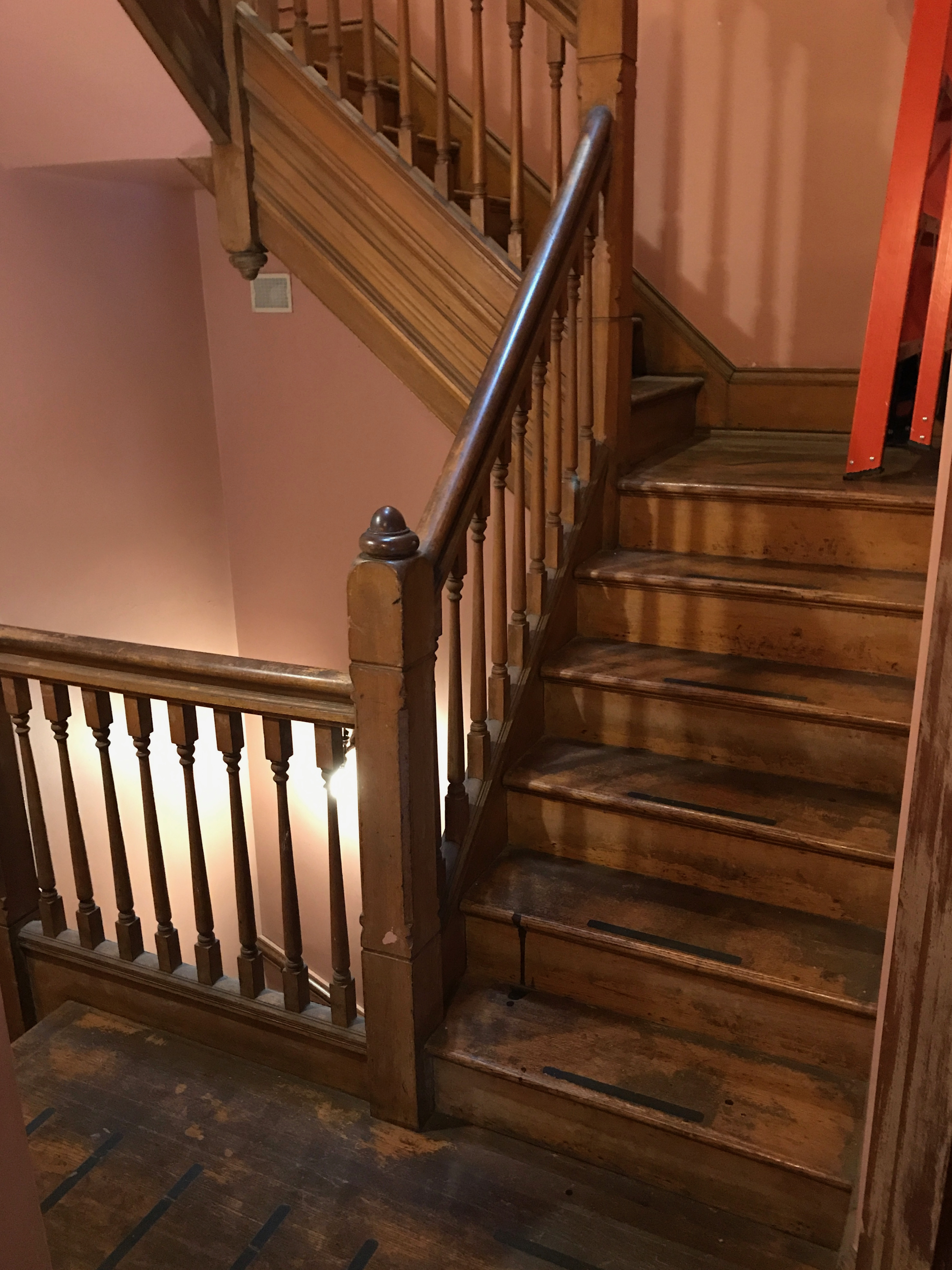
Hidden stairwell for household staff

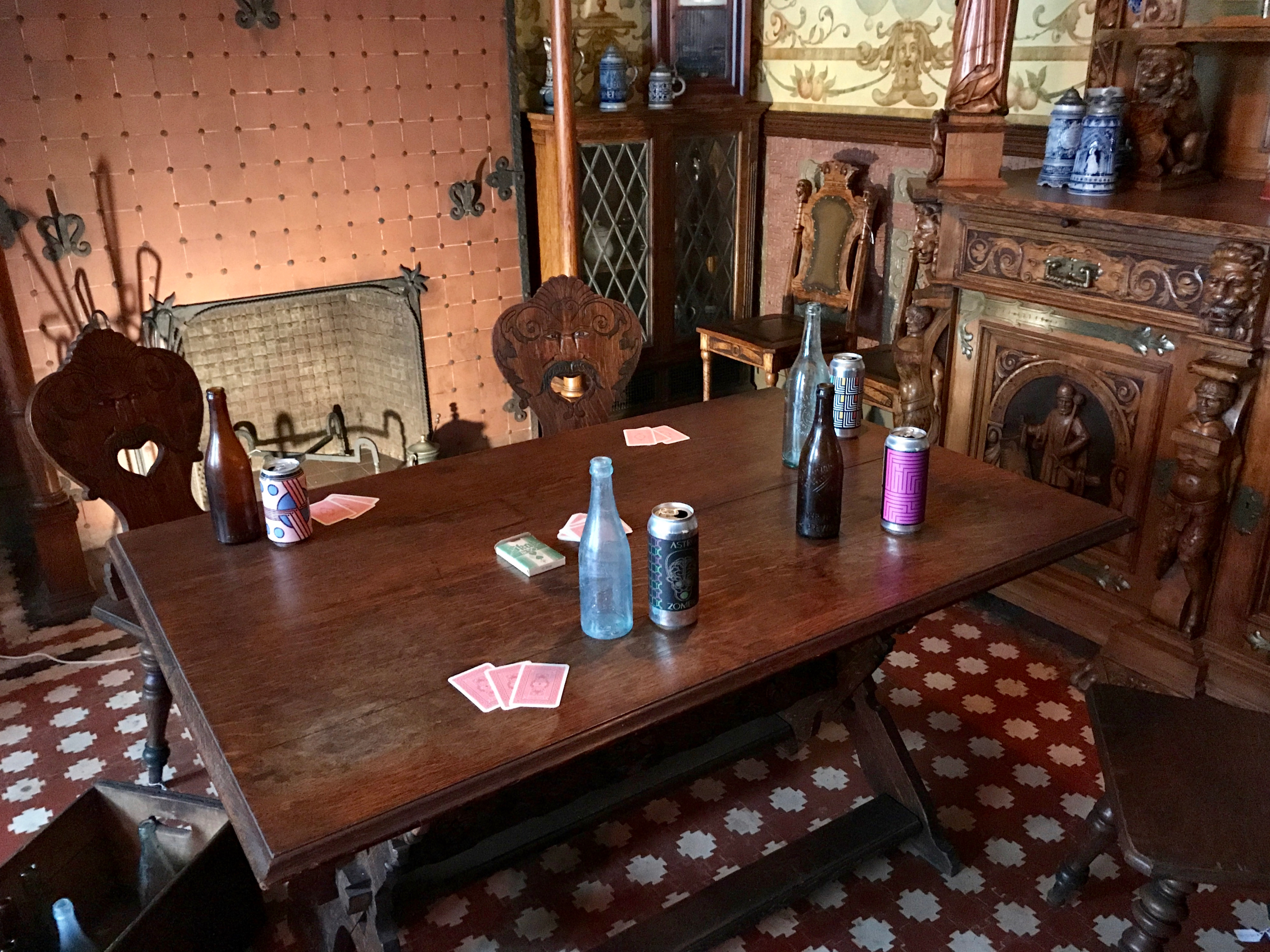
Beer drinking room in the basement

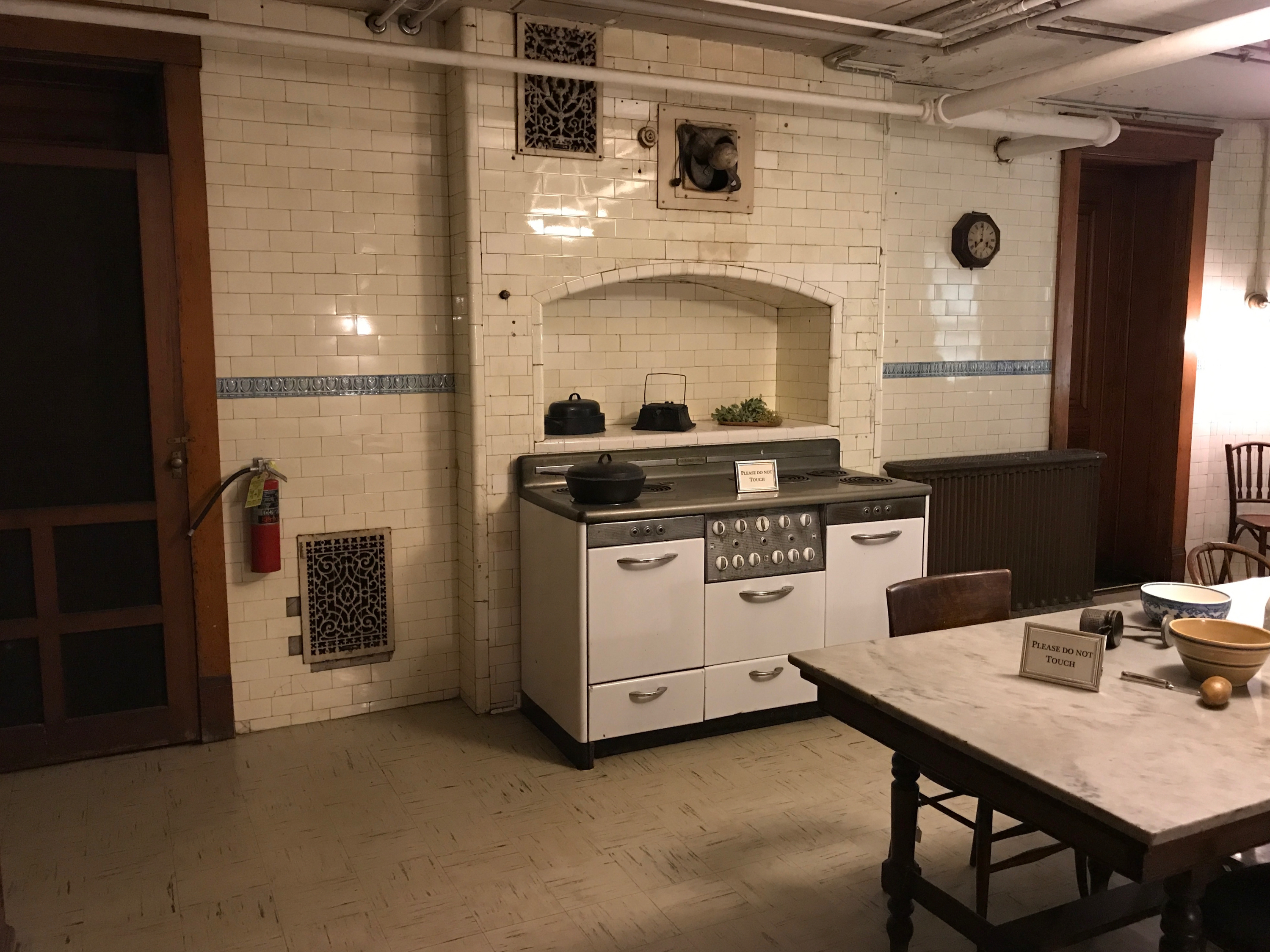
Kitchen in basement
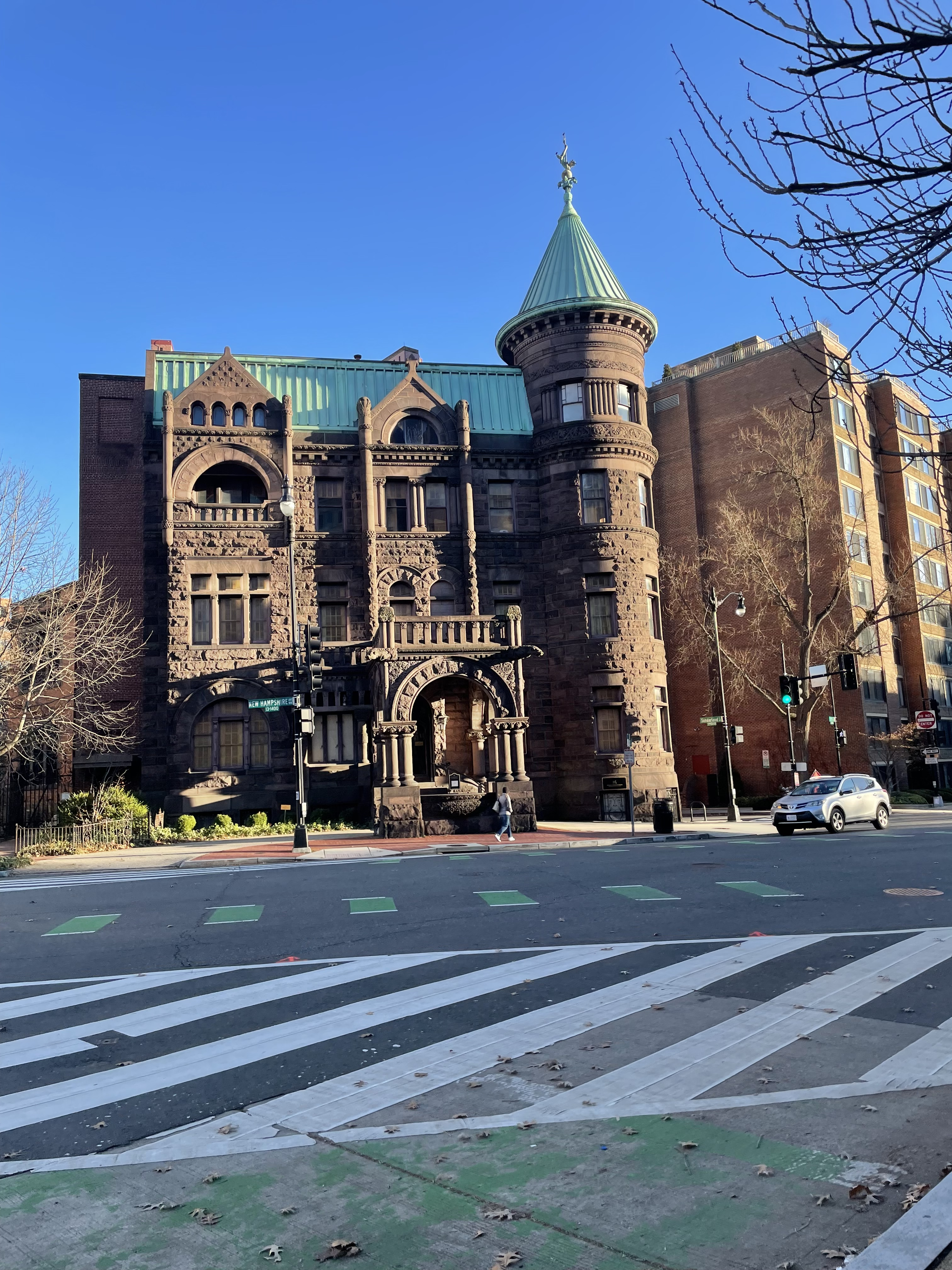
façade

== See also ==
- Heurich Mausoleum. The final resting place of the Christian Heurich family.
