= Heurich Mausoleum =

Public artwork by sculptor Louis Amateis

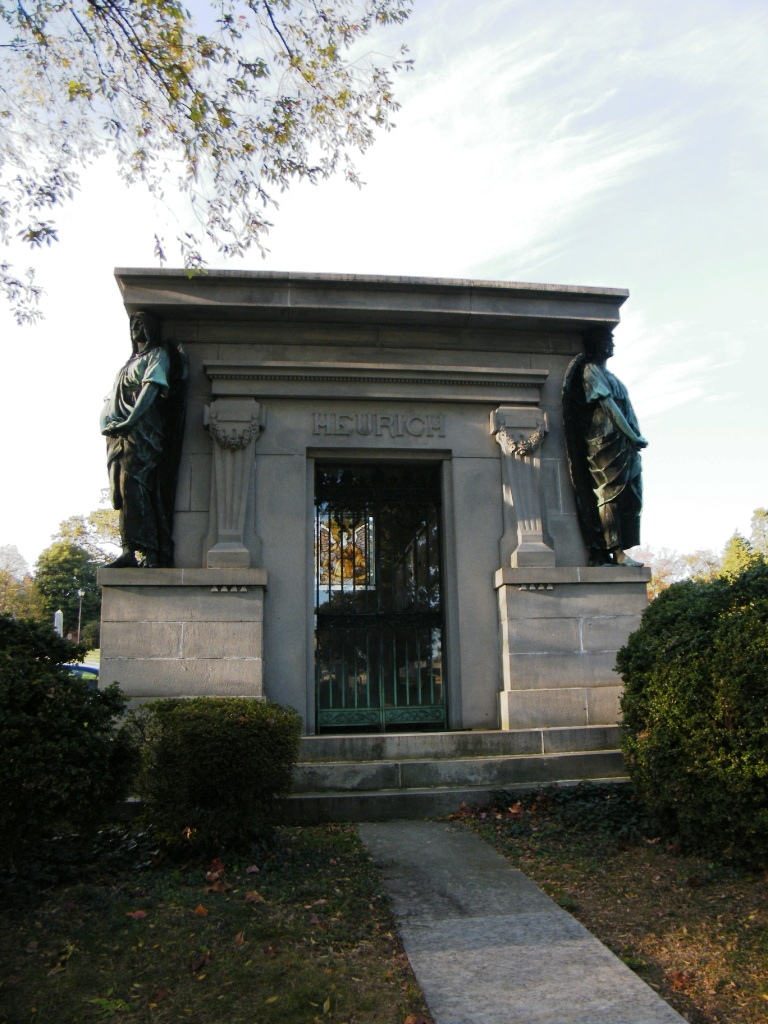
- Mausoleum in 2010
- Artist: Louis Amateis
- Year: c. 1895
- Type: Bronze & Granite
- Dimensions: 240 cm × 110 cm × 70 cm (96 in × 43.2 in × 27.6 in)
- Location: Washington, D.C., United States; 38°56′46.95″N 77°0′40.7″W
- Owner: Rock Creek Cemetery

Heurich Mausoleum is a public artwork by sculptor Louis Amateis, located at Rock Creek Cemetery in Washington, D.C., United States. "Heurich Mausoleum" was originally surveyed as part of the Smithsonian's Save Outdoor Sculpture! survey in May 1993. This sculpture is the final resting place of members of the Heurich family.

== Description ==
Four caryatids are attached to each corner of a granite mausoleum (15 by 22 by 16 feet or 4.6 by 6.7 by 4.9 metres). They each have wings and stand with their hands clasped in front of their waist with their eyes closed. The placement has their heads touching the mausoleum's roof and their bare feet resting on a low ledge. Two of the figures have braided hair, one has hair that hangs down over her shoulders, and the final figure has a cape pulled around her head. The back of the mausoleum has a stained glass window showing an angel holding a scroll that is inscribed with the word Peace.

The caryatids are signed:

L. AMATEIS
Gorham MFG CO Founders

Over the mausoleum door, it is inscribed: HEURICH

The interior wall of the mausoleum is inscribed in German:

In Tiefem
Schmerz Kein
Weltweisheit
Fürs Herz

Translation: In Deep Pain, (There is) no Worldly Wisdom for the Heart

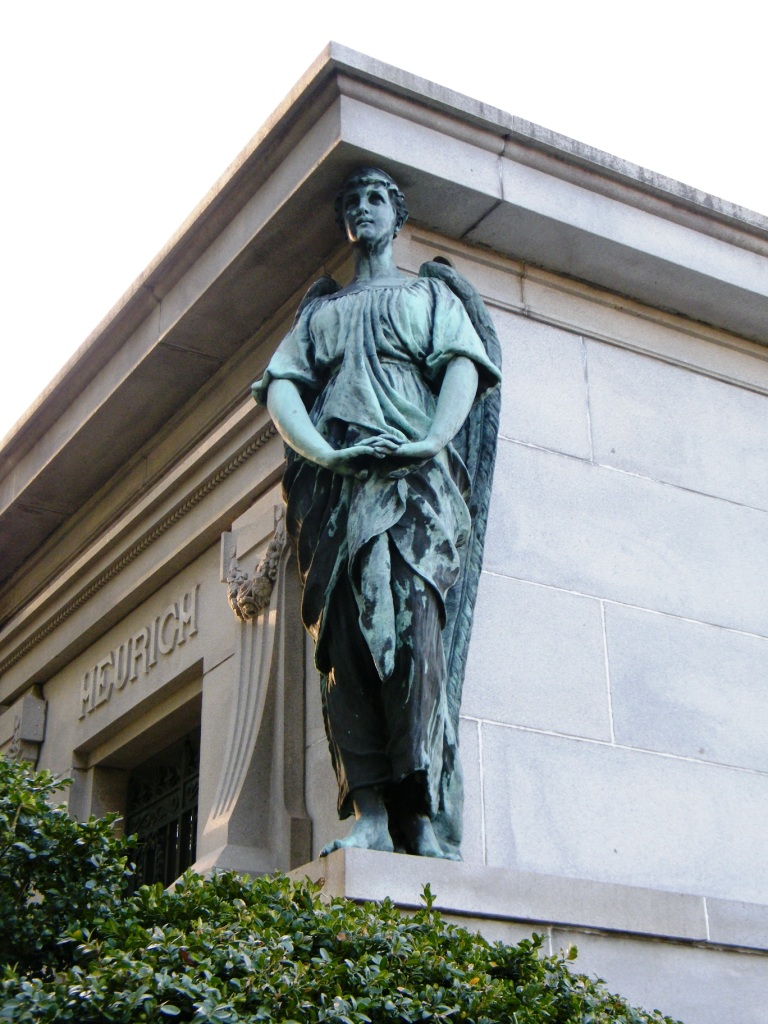
Front right

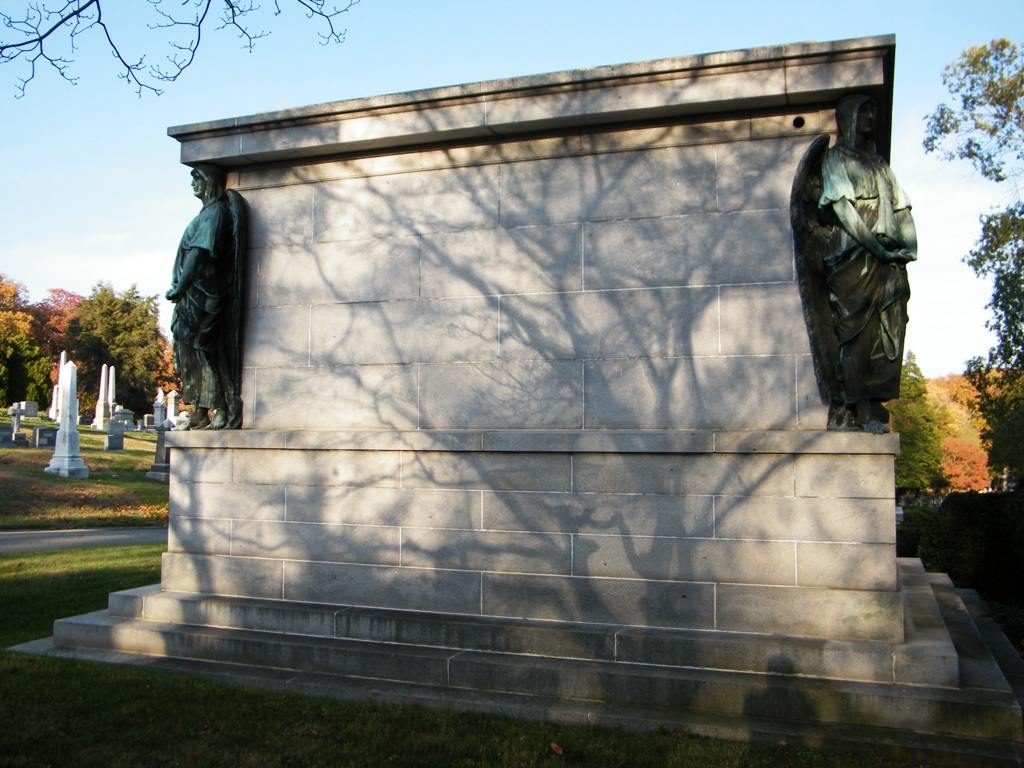
Proper left

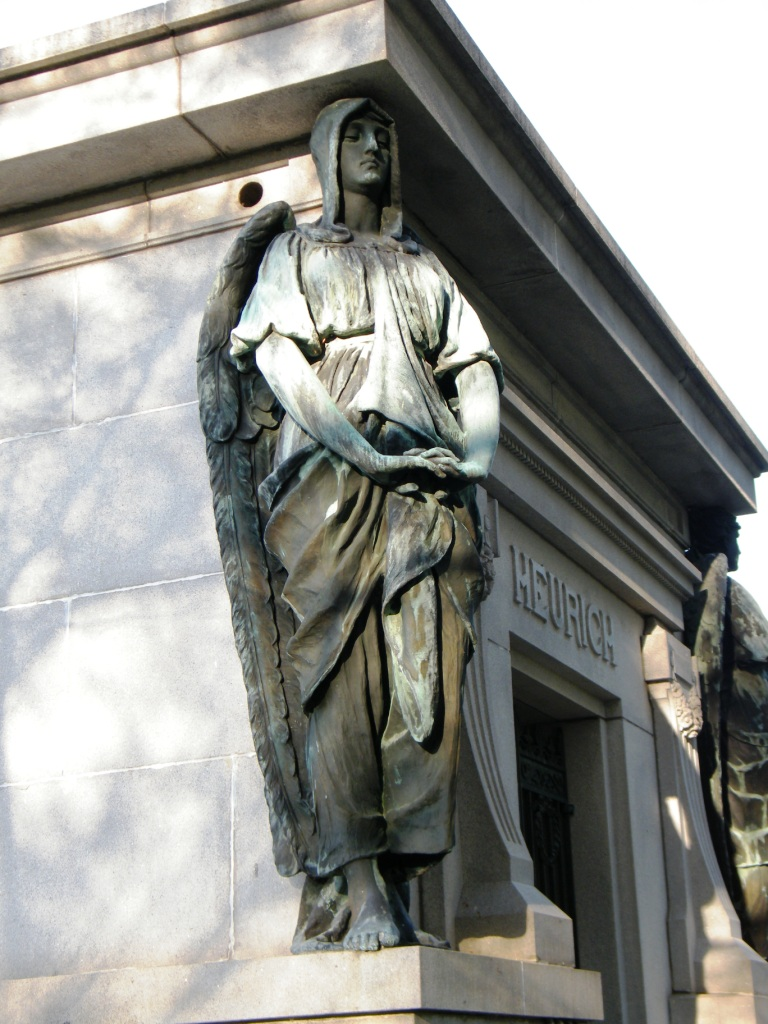
Front left

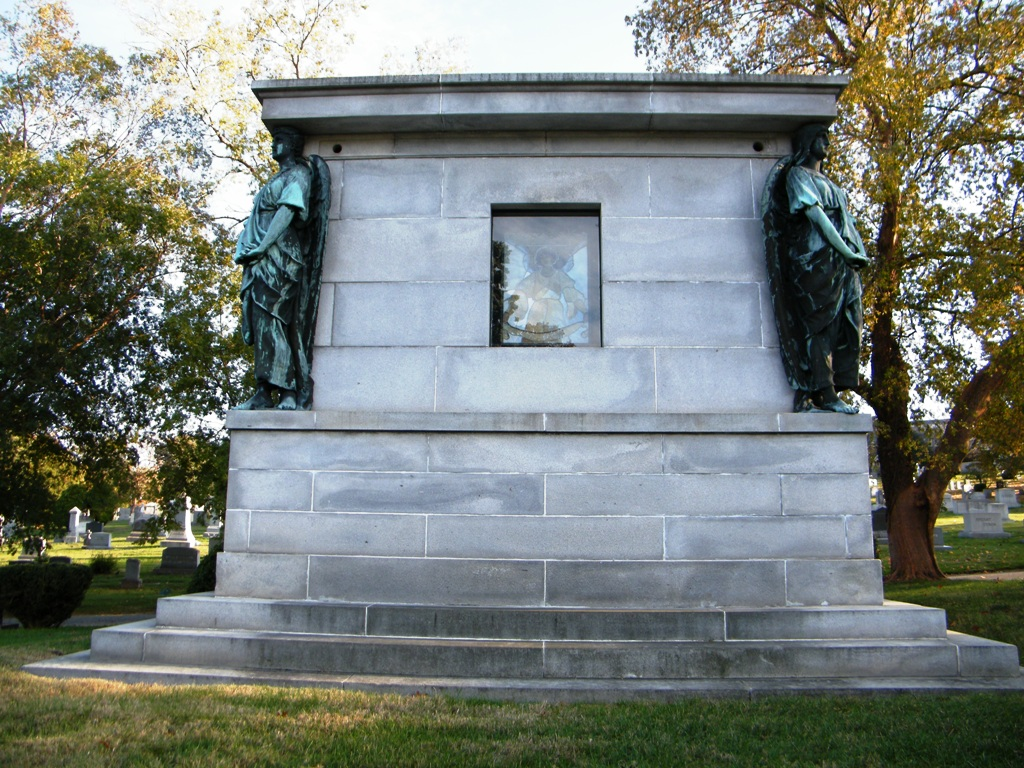
Back

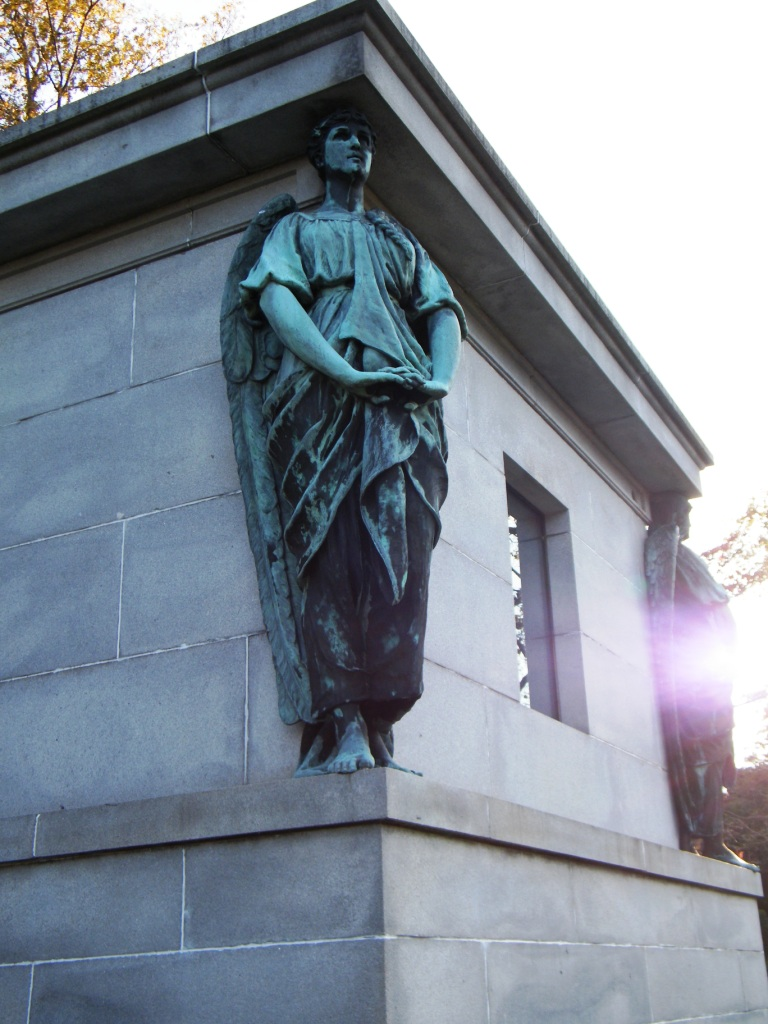
Back left

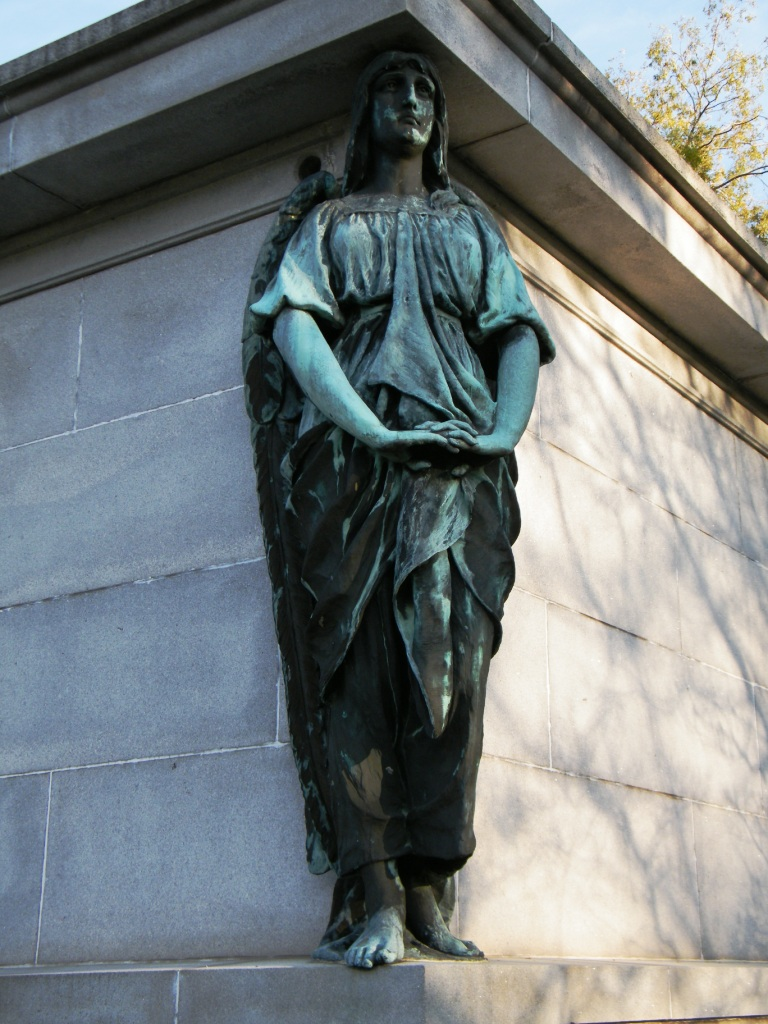

== Artist ==
Louis Amateis was born in Turin, Italy, on December 13, 1855. Amateis studied architecture at Istituto Italiano di Tecnologia and sculpture at the Royal Academy of Fine Art. With national and regional Italian, he also studied in Milan and Paris before moving to New York City in 1883. Working as an architectural sculptor at McKim, Mead, and White, he married his wife, Dora Ballin, in 1889. After getting married, the couple and their four sons moved to Washington, D.C., where he founded the School of Architecture and Fine Arts at what became George Washington University. He served as chairman from 1892 to 1902. He died March 18, 1913, of apoplexy. His son, Edmond, went on to be a prominent sculptor as well.

Amateis has designed work for the United States Capitol and busts of Chester A. Arthur, General Winfield Scott Hancock, General John Logan, Andrew Carnegie among others.

== Acquisition ==
The Heurich family mausoleum was originally located at their family dairy farm in Prince George's County, Maryland. The farm was located in Hyattsville, in a large part of the southern portion of the tract of land contained within Queen's Chapel Road, Ager Road, University Boulevard, and Adelphi Road. The Prince George's Plaza shopping mall (now known as the Mall at Prince George's) was built on the home and dairy barn site. The mausoleum was moved to Rock Creek Cemetery in 1951 after Mrs. Heurich (Christian Heurich's third wife) sold the farm.

== Information ==
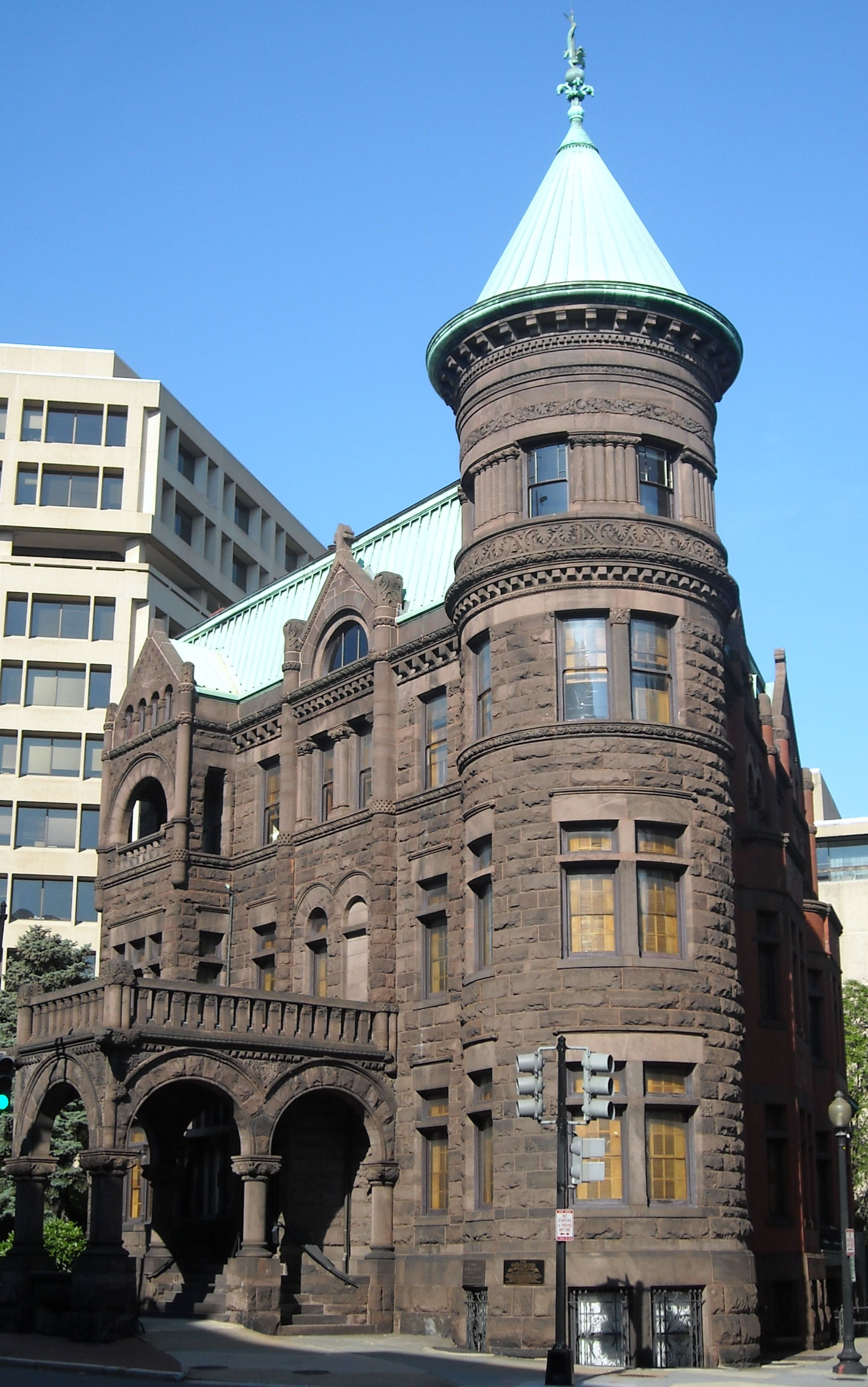
The Heurich Mansion

This mausoleum serves as the final resting place for members of the Heurich family. Christian Heurich (1842–1945) immigrated from Germany to the United States in 1866. In 1872 he founded Christian Heurich Brewing Company in Washington, which was first located in Dupont Circle, then relocated to a much larger site in 1895 between what is now the Theodore Roosevelt Bridge and the Kennedy Center. The brewery closed in 1956 and was torn down in 1961. The Heurichs lived in Dupont Circle in what is known as the Brewmaster's Castle.

The stained glass located on the back wall was designed by Louis Comfort Tiffany.

== Condition ==
This sculpture was surveyed in 1993 for its condition and was described as needing treatment.
