= Schnell Brewery =

Former brewery in Washington, D.C.

The Schnell Brewery (1864–1872) was an American brewery in Washington, D.C.

The brewery, owned by George Schnell, was located in the Dupont Circle neighborhood on 20th Street between M and N Streets, Northwest. It was purchased by Christian Heurich and Paul Rutter in 1872 and served as the first location of the Christian Heurich Brewing Company.

The Schnell brewery produced Weißbier in small quantities during its operation. When Heurich and Ritter purchased the brewery, George Schnell was sick, and the brewery was operated by his wife, one of the early female brewers in Washington, D.C.
