= Lucas Maius =

German Protestant pastor and playwright

Lucas Maius (also Mai, May, Majus) (October 14, 1522 in Römhild – 4 or 5 March 1598 in Kassel) was a German Protestant pastor who converted from Lutheranism to Calvinism, and playwright during the Protestant Reformation.

== Life ==
Lucas Maius was born in Römhild in 1522, to mill owner Michael May and his wife, Martha Dörrer. In his early years, he moved with his parents to Hildburghausen, as his father took part in the German Peasants' War. There, he attended school in the winters, helping with the farmwork in the summer months. He learned a simple job as tailor. In 1548, he completed his studies at the University of Wittenberg, where he had attended lectures by Philipp Melanchthon. In 1549, he traveled to Silesia, Prussia, Poland, Denmark and Holland.

In 1550, he became a schoolteacher, and after his marriage in 1551, he became principal of the school in Hildburghausen. Ordained by Johann Stössel in Weimar, Maius took over as substitute pastor in Eishausen, Straufhain in 1561, and in 1562 became pastor as well. At another parish in Weimar in 1565, he earned his Master of Philosophy at the University of Jena in 1567. In 1568, he became senior pastor in Rudolstadt, and he went in the fall of 1575 as senior pastor and Superintendent of St. Mary's Church in Halle, Saxony-Anhalt. In that capacity, he signed the 1577 Formula of Concord in Wolmirstedt, though suspicion fell on him of being a Crypto-Calvinist.

In 1577, Maius hosted Jakob Andreae, Nicholas Selnecker, and other fellow Reformation pastors at Halle, where they developed a sort of philosophical conundrum known as the 'Devil's Cross' (Teufels kreutz) that was said to have turned numerous parishioners away from the devil. It was explained as follows:

If the devil	lies, dies,	then he is real; therefore it's certain that he also	dies. lies.

He became involved in the constant dispute over Article VIII (on the Person of Christ), and because of some statements he allegedly had made against the Concord, was interrogated by the Administrator of the Archbishopric of Magdeburg, Joachim III Frederick, Elector of Brandenburg. Seeing no prospects in Halle, he was dismissed from his post in 1579, converted to the Reformed faith, and took a position as second pastor in Kassel Altstadt. There, he rose to first pastor, and became chaplain to the Landgrave Wilhelm IV of Hesse.

As a comedic playwright, Maius also wrote a script, Von der wunderlichen Vereinigung Göttlicher Gerechtigkeit und Barmherzigkeit. (From the Wonderful Union of Divine Justice and Mercy). He also translated Nicholas Selnecker's Paedagogia Christiana.

== Family ==
He was married on 13 Jan. 1551 to the daughter of the mayor of Bad Rodach, Dorothea Schmuck (d. 9 Apr. 1560 in Hildburghausen), with whom he had six children.

He was married a second time in Hildburghausen on 4 Oct. 1561 to Barbara Kirch (born 1540, d. 20 Jan 1608 in Kassel). 12 children were produced from that marriage.

Known children are:

- 1. Nicolaus, became counselor in Magdeburg
- 2. Jonas
- 3. Paul
- 4. Lucas (born 7 July 1571 in Rudolstadt) pastor in Kassel
- 5. Rebecca; married 1592 in Kassel to Johannes Meurer
- 6. Sybilla (1575), married 1598 Hermann Fabronius
- 7. Maria
- 8. Andreas
- 9. Eckbrecht (1581), married Elisabeth Cothmann, d. 1652
- 10. Johann (born 6 Dec. 1599 in Kassel, d. 15 März 1640), pastor in Kassel
- 11. Name unknown, daughter married Caspar Lotz

== Sources ==
- Oskar Hütteroth: Die althessischen Pfarrer der Reformationszeit. NG Elwert, 1966, p. 217
- Wilhelm Scherer: Lucas Maius (German Wikisource). In: Allgemeine Deutsche Biographie (ADB). Band 20. Duncker & Humblot, Leipzig 1884, pp.124 f.
- Wilhelm Kosch: Deutsches Literatur-lexikon. Verlag Francke, Bern and Munich, 1966, ISBN 3-317-01539-X, ISBN 978-3-317-01539-4 Vol 10, p. 245
- Veronika Albrecht-Birkner: Pfarrerbuch der Kirchenprovinz Sachsen. Evangelische Verlagsanstalt, Leipzig, 2007, ISBN 978-3-374-02137-6 p. 503
- Lucas Maius in Zedlers Universallexikon, Volume 19, Spring 363
- Lupold von Lehsten: Die hessischen Reichstagsgesandten im 17. Und 18. Jahrhundert. Hessische Historische Kommission, Darmstadt, 2003, ISBN 3-88443-091-2, ISBN 978-3-88443-091-0
- Ralf Böckmann (2011). "Lucas Maius". In Bautz, Traugott (ed.). Biographisch-Bibliographisches Kirchenlexikon (BBKL) (in German). Vol. 32. Nordhausen: Bautz. cols. 907–911. ISBN 978-3-88309-615-5.
- Script of Comedy, "on Divine Justice and Mercy" by Lucas Maius
