= Mendhausen =

- Ortsteil of Römhild
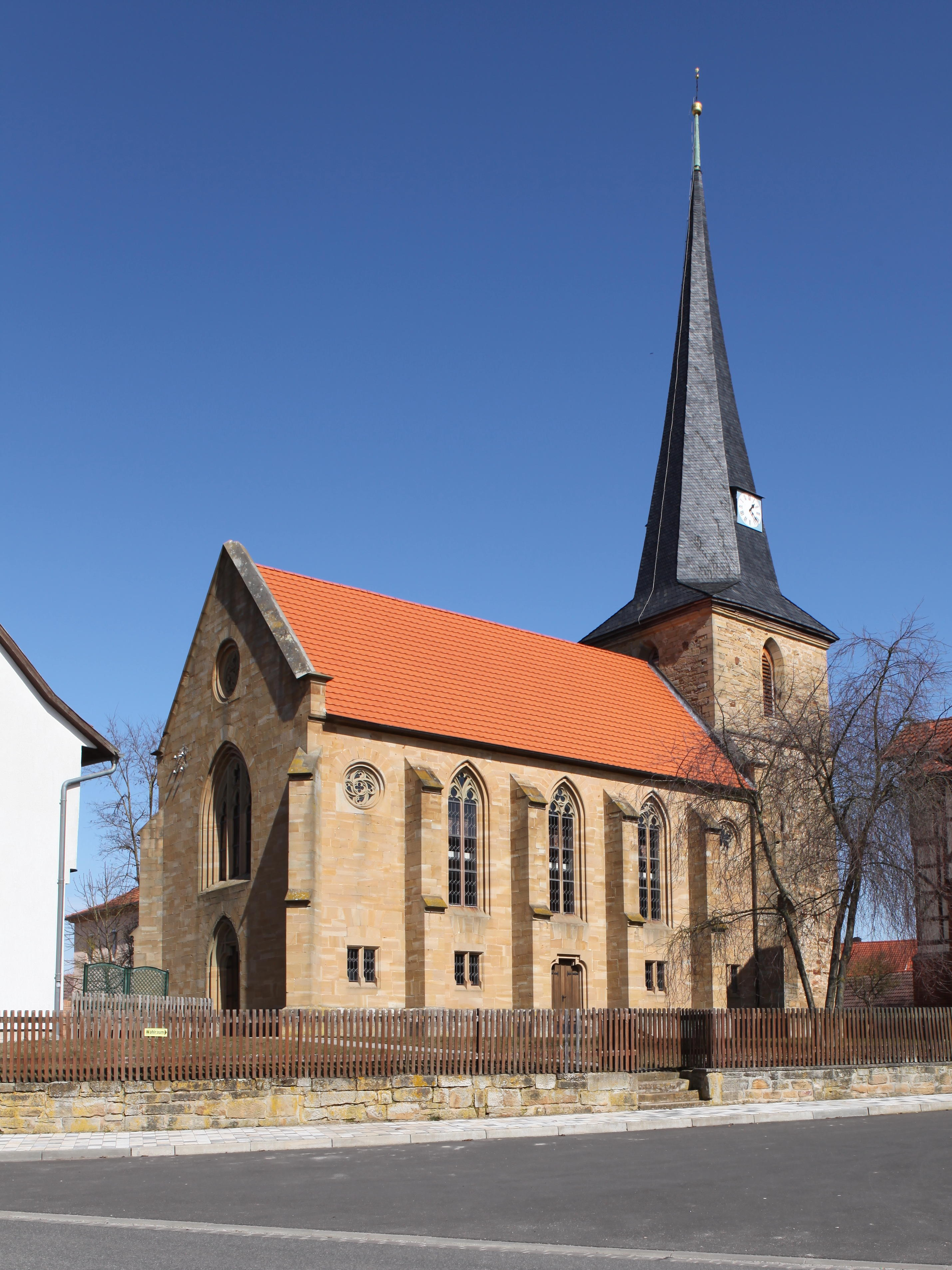

- Coat of arms
- Interactive map of Mendhausen
- Location within Germany Location within Thuringia
- Coordinates: 50°22′N 10°28′E
- Country: Germany
- State: Thuringia
- District: Hildburghausen
- Town: Römhild

Area
  - Total: 9.96 km^{2} (3.85 sq mi)
- Elevation: 300 m (980 ft)

Population (2013)
  - Total: 310
  - Density: 31/km^{2} (81/sq mi)
- Time zone: UTC+01:00 (CET)
  - Summer (DST): UTC+02:00 (CEST)
- Dialling codes: 036948
- Vehicle registration: HBN
- Website: www.mendhausen.de

Mendhausen is a classic Frankish village and a former municipality in the district of Hildburghausen, in Thuringia, Germany. Since December 31, 2012, it has been part of the town of Römhild.

== Geography ==
Mendhausen is located in the southwest of Römhild at the Thuringian-Frankish border on a higher plateau of the Thuringian Rhön.

“In the morning this attractive village is bordered on the east parish of Römhild, from where it is only one hour away, at lunchtime Irmelshausen, in the evening Rothausen and the deserted village Eichelbrunn and midnight at the Mönchshof..." Thus, the location of the village Mendhausen is described in the "Historical and statistical description of the Ducal Saxon Community Office Römhild" of 1795.

Density is low. The settlement has a church at its center.

== History ==
The history of the town probably started in the 7th or 8th century, but this is not precisely known. Mendhausen was probably one of the three Höchheims founded at 783 (Great Hoechheim = the present Hoechheim, Small Hoechheim = Mönchshof) by the Frankish noble Countess Emhilt.

The first Attribution "Mentehusen" comes from a deed of 1156 (Count Poppo of Irmelshausen, a Henneberger line). Mendhausen hosts the first church in the area: it was mother church of Römhild until 1405.

“Agriculture was the main food source of residents along with some spinning, bleaching, Livestock and wine ...". Between 1710 and 1918, the Duchy of Meiningen governed Mendhausen Mendhausen belonged to the district of the Möhnshof, which played a significant role in Mendhausen's development. Mönchshof was mentioned in a document at the time of Charles the Great. Charles was often a guest at the Mönchshof.

The village was once surrounded by walls, known locally as Gaden (storage rooms). In 1796, the village had 280 inhabitants with 69 hearths (households). The 30 Years War reduced the population by more than 60%.

In 1897 a school started next to the church, built in the vicinity of an earlier communal bakehouse. A tavern, three toy shops, a wheelwright and a blacksmith were available until the Second World War.

Mendhausen was always a farming village. During the 1950s and 1960s, the collectivization of agriculture led to the elimination of individual farms. In 1969, a dairy farm arose. In the same year, work began on the construction of a potable water line followedby the construction of the sewage system.

From 1968 to 1972, the House of Culture (a building for group events) arose. Citizens developed another division for athletes, called the athlete's home and a shop, where the youth club was later established.

In 1988 the Möhnchshif was scheduled to be leveled, which was prevented by citizen opposition. After 1990, an apartment building area was developed for young families.

== Life ==
Clubs in the city are active. The sports club reached its 100th anniversary in 2011. FFW, founded in 1875, took an initiative to rebuild their old shed in 2010. The fair society is preserved by the continuation of costume carnival traditions. The women of the city founded a Carnival Club. The home club founded in 1999 maintains and preserves traditions and testimonies. The newly restored bakery and a small village museum are used and preserved by the club members.
