= Milz (Römhild) =

- Ortsteil of Römhild
- Interactive map of Milz
- Location within Germany Location within Thuringia
- Coordinates: 50.3776°N 10.5376°E
- Country: Germany
- State: Thuringia
- District: Hildburghausen
- Town: Römhild

Area
  - Total: 17.62 km^{2} (6.80 sq mi)
- Elevation: 291 m (955 ft)

Population (2011-12-31)
  - Total: 922
  - Density: 52.3/km^{2} (136/sq mi)
- Time zone: UTC+01:00 (CET)
  - Summer (DST): UTC+02:00 (CEST)
- Postal codes: 98631
- Dialling codes: 036948
- Vehicle registration: HBN
- Website: www.roemhild.info

Milz (German pronunciation: [mɪlts]) is a village and a former municipality in the district of Hildburghausen, in Thuringia, Germany. Since 31 December 2012, it is part of the town Römhild.
