= Haina, Hildburghausen =

Haina
- Ortsteil of Römhild
- Coat of arms
- Interactive map of Haina
- Location within Germany Location within Thuringia
- Coordinates: 50°25′N 10°32′E
- Country: Germany
- State: Thuringia
- District: Hildburghausen
- Town: Römhild

Area
  - Total: 19.71 km^{2} (7.61 sq mi)
- Elevation: 315 m (1,033 ft)

Population (2011-12-31)
  - Total: 991
  - Density: 50.3/km^{2} (130/sq mi)
- Time zone: UTC+01:00 (CET)
  - Summer (DST): UTC+02:00 (CEST)
- Postal codes: 98631
- Dialling codes: 036948
- Vehicle registration: HBN
- Website: www.roemhild.info

Haina (German pronunciation: [ˈhaɪna]) is a village and a former municipality in the district of Hildburghausen, in Thuringia, Germany. Since 31 December 2012, it is part of the town Römhild. It was the birthplace of Hans Hut (c. 1490–6 December 1527), an Anabaptist in Southern Germany and Austria.

== Sons and daughters of the village ==
- Christian Heurich, brewer; founder of Christian Heurich Brewing Company of Washington, DC (born 12 September 1842, in Haina, died 7 March 1945, in Washington, DC)
