= Westenfeld =

- Ortsteil of Römhild
- Interactive map of Westenfeld
- Location within Germany Location within Thuringia
- Coordinates: 50°26′N 10°30′E
- Country: Germany
- State: Thuringia
- District: Hildburghausen
- Town: Römhild

Area
  - Total: 8.00 km^{2} (3.09 sq mi)
- Elevation: 327 m (1,073 ft)

Population (2011-12-31)
  - Total: 380
  - Density: 48/km^{2} (120/sq mi)
- Time zone: UTC+01:00 (CET)
  - Summer (DST): UTC+02:00 (CEST)
- Postal codes: 98631
- Dialling codes: 036948
- Vehicle registration: HBN
- Website: www.roemhild.info

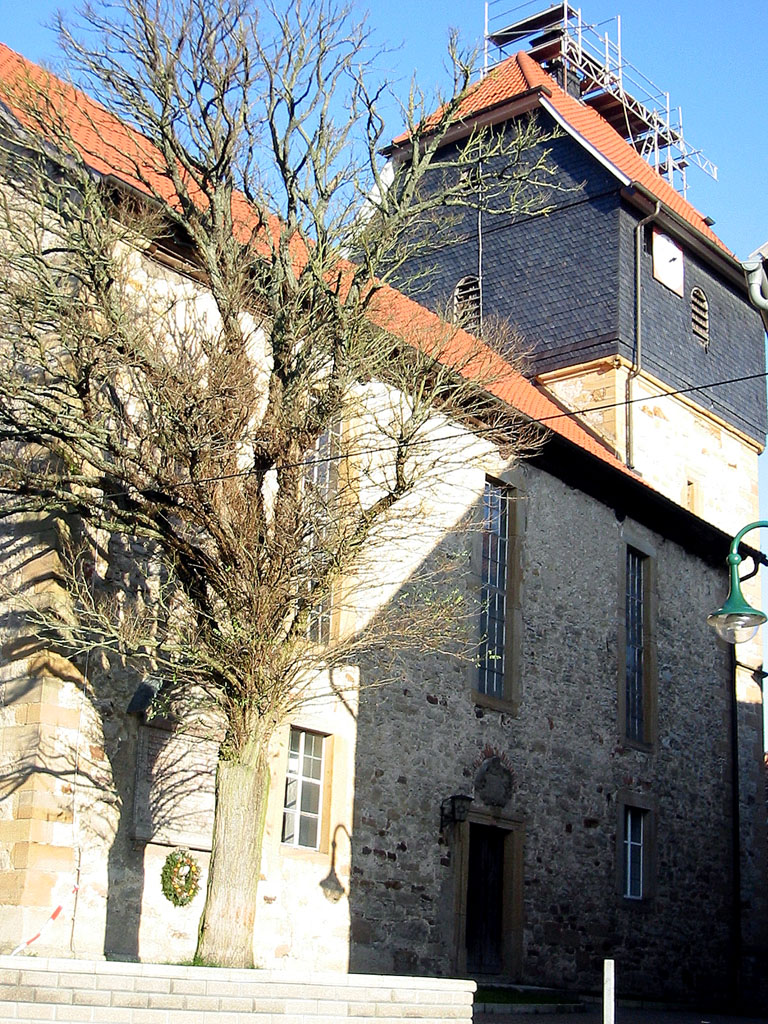
Church of Westenfeld

Westenfeld (German pronunciation: [ˈvɛstn̩ˌfɛlt]) is a village and a former municipality located in the district of Hildburghausen, in Thuringia, Germany. However, since 31 December 2012, it has been incorporated into the town of Römhild.

== History ==
The village was first mentioned in 871. The site originally belonged to the Fulda monastery, and later, it came under the possession of the Vessra Abbey. In 1634, Westenfeld was sacked and set on fire during historical events. The village church's history dates back to 1185, and the current structure was built in 1579. Notably, the baptismal font dates back to the 16th Century, while the first bell is from 1777 (crafted by J.A. Mayer, Coburg), and the second bell is from 1850 (crafted by R. Mayer, Rudolstadt).

Additionally, Westenfeld is home to a Historical Museum.

== See also ==
- Media related to Westenfeld at Wikimedia Commons
