= Römhild =

- Town
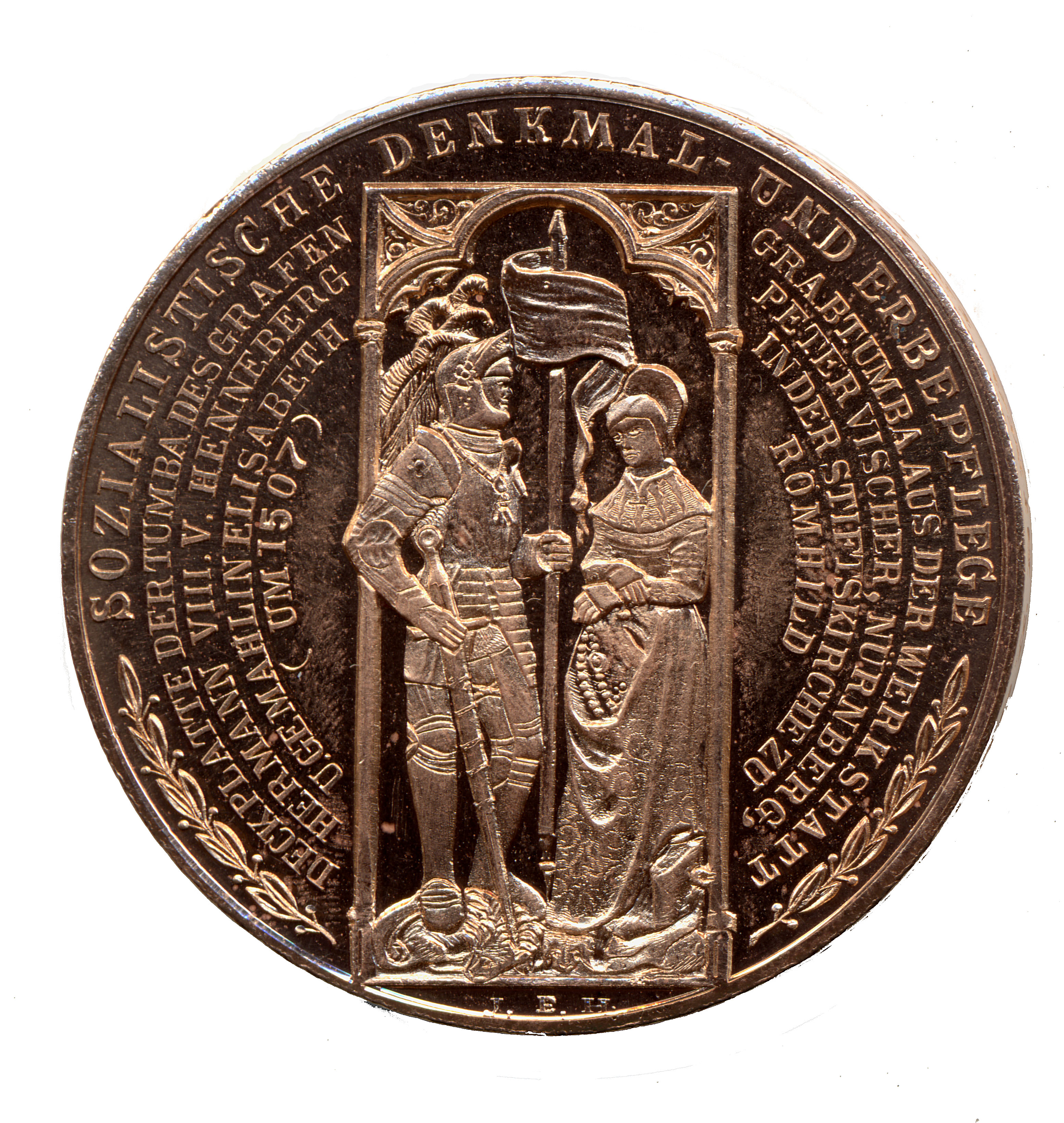
- Medallion commemorating the Henneberg tomb

- Coat of arms

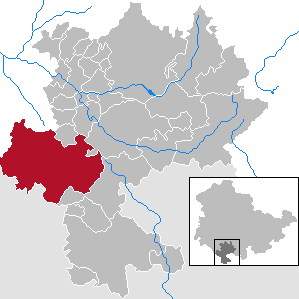
- Location of Römhild within Hildburghausen district
- Interactive map of Römhild
- Location within Germany Location within Thuringia
- Coordinates: 50°23′N 10°33′E
- Country: Germany
- State: Thuringia
- District: Hildburghausen

Government
  - Mayor (2019–25): Heiko Bartholomäus (CDU)

Area
  - Total: 122.45 km^{2} (47.28 sq mi)
- Elevation: 300 m (980 ft)

Population (2025-12-31)
  - Total: 6,383
  - Density: 52.13/km^{2} (135.0/sq mi)
- Time zone: UTC+01:00 (CET)
  - Summer (DST): UTC+02:00 (CEST)
- Postal codes: 98628–98631
- Dialling codes: 036948
- Vehicle registration: HBN
- Website: www.stadt-roemhild.de

Römhild (German: [ˈʁøːmˌhɪlt]) is a town in the district of Hildburghausen, in Thuringia, Germany. It is situated 14 km west of Hildburghausen, and 21 km southeast of Meiningen. On 31 December 2012, it merged with the former municipalities Gleichamberg, Haina, Mendhausen, Milz and Westenfeld.

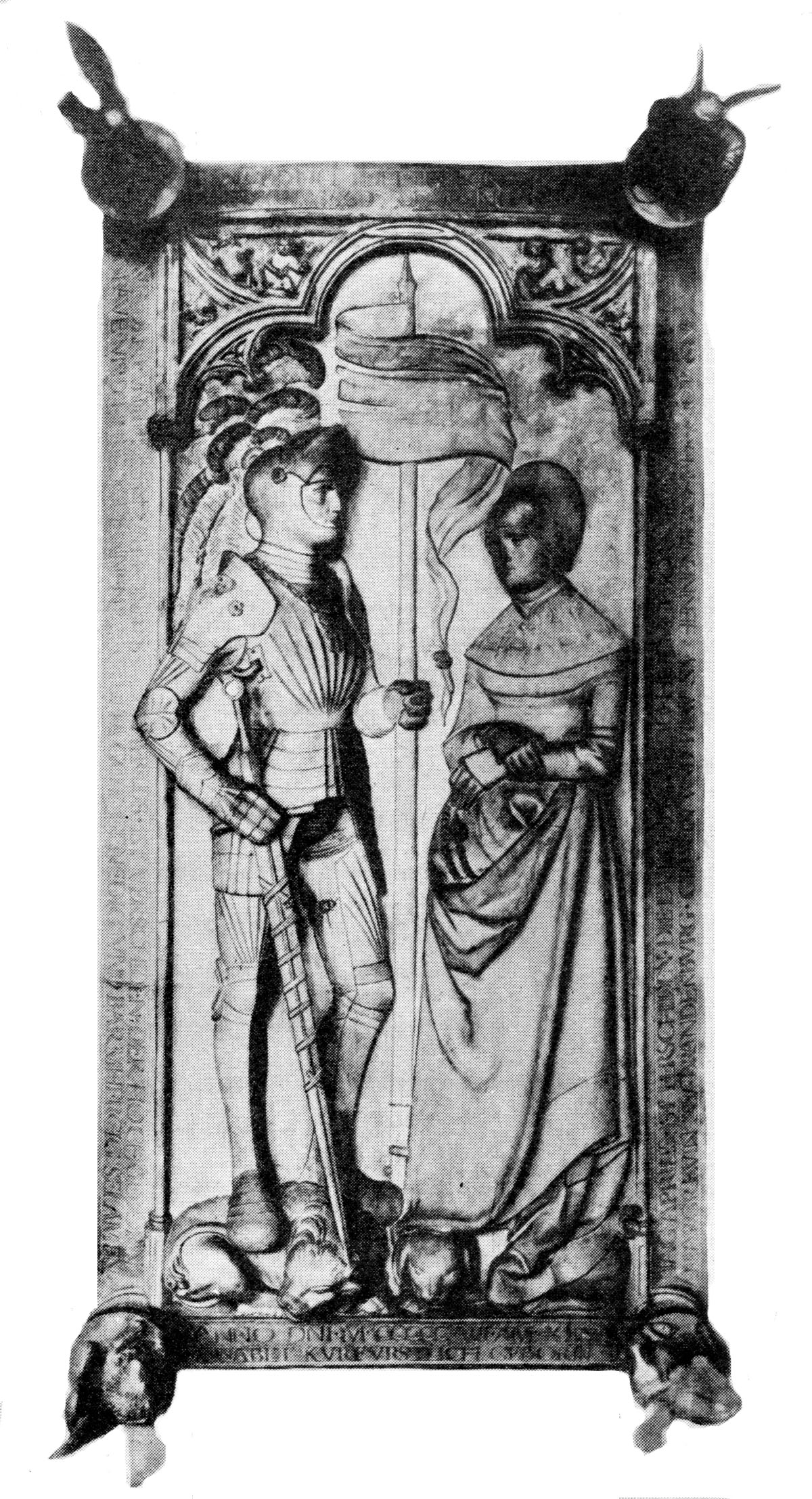
Tomb of Count Hermann VIII of Henneberg and wife Elizabeth of Brandenburg by Herman Vischer the Younger located in the parish church is a masterpiece of bronze art

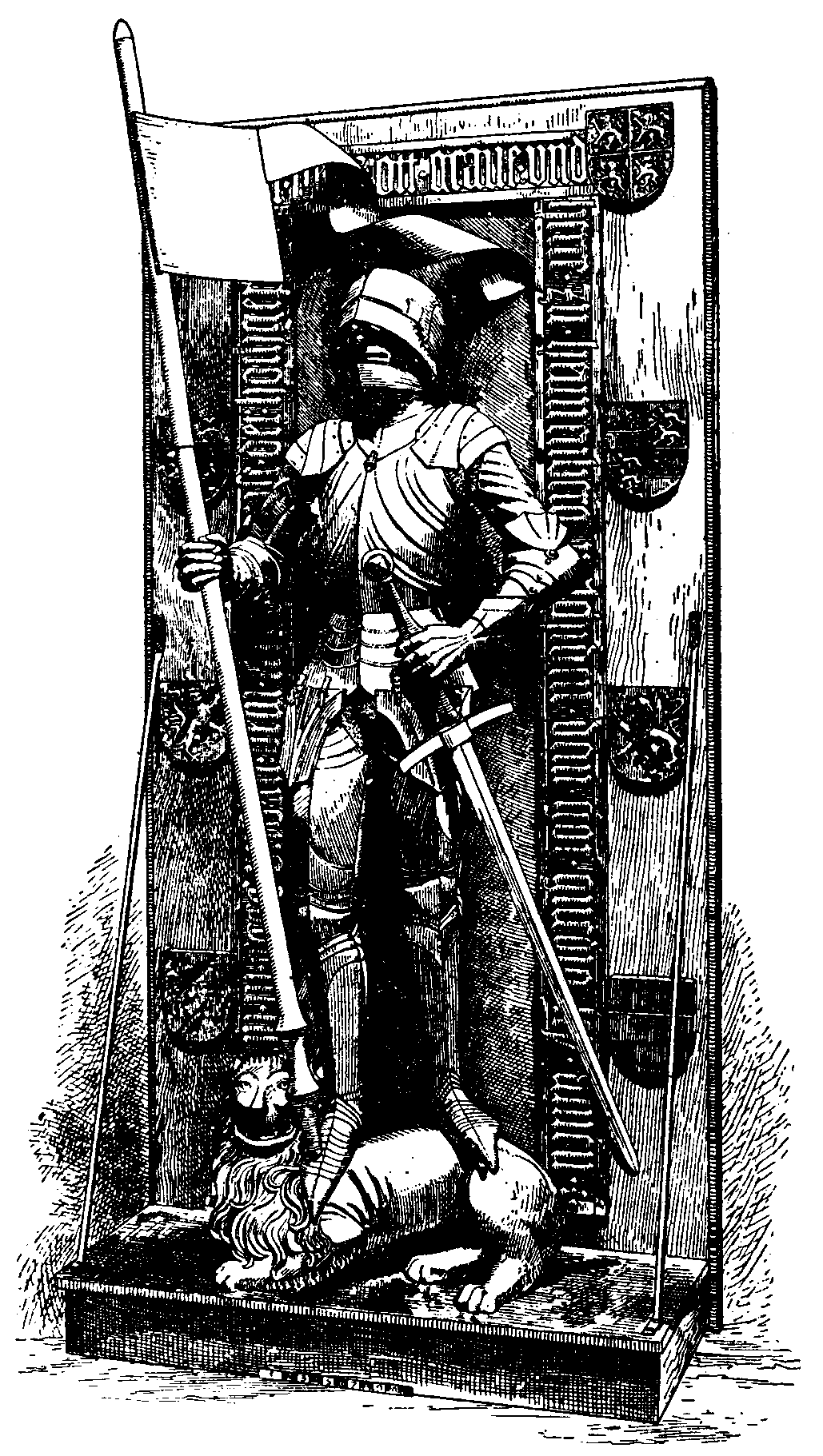
Engraving of Monument of Count Otto IV of Henneberg by Vischer workshop

In the Stadtkirche of Römhild is the tomb of Elisabeth (a daughter of Albrecht III Achilles, Elector of Brandenburg) and Hermann VIII of Henneberg. The grave has sometimes been attributed to Herman Vischer the Younger (c.1486–1517), a member of the Vischer Family of Nuremberg.

The name is first attested in Medieval Latin in 800 AD as locus Rotmulte in the annals of Fulda Abbey.

== Notable people ==
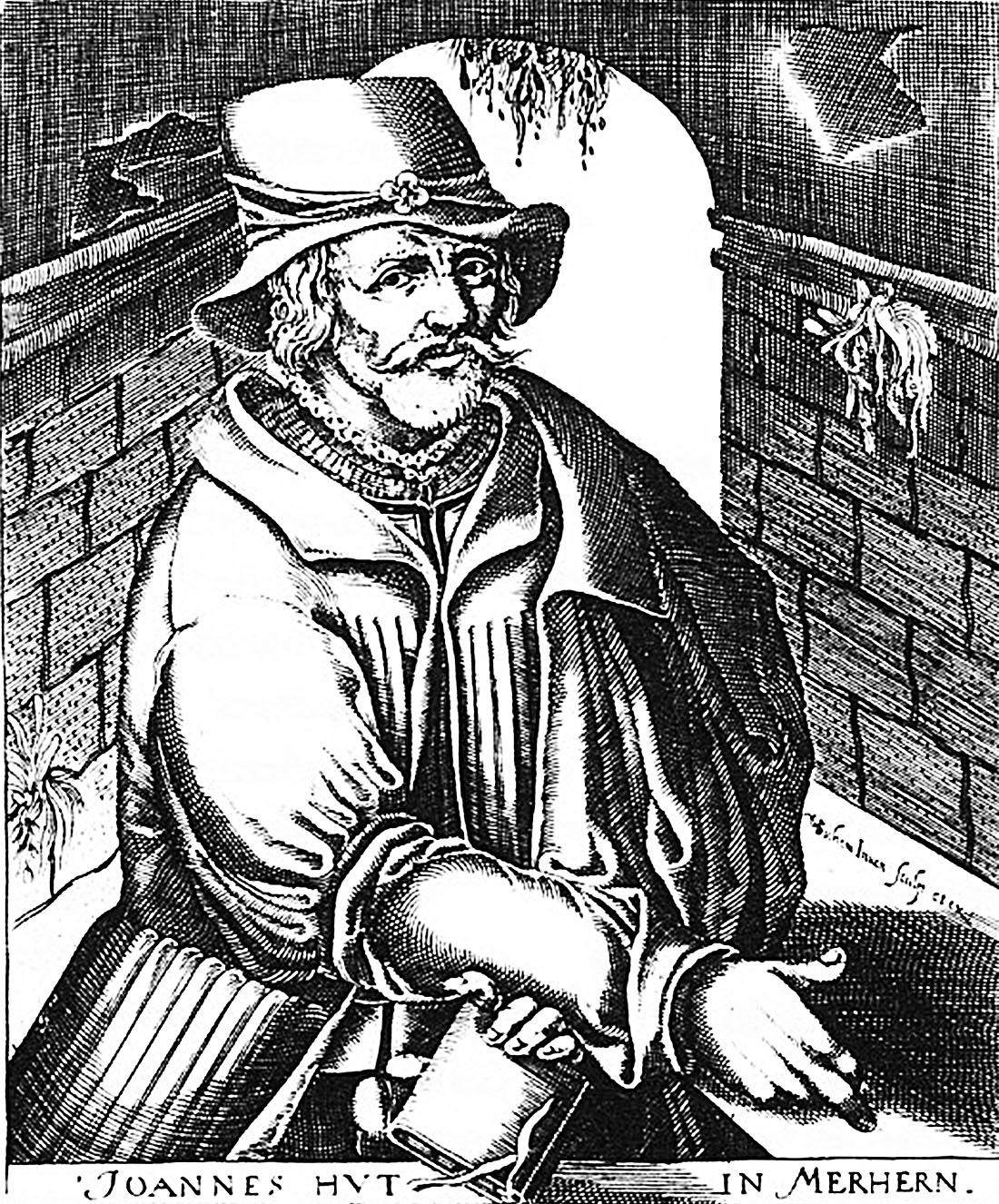
Hans Hut

- Hans Hut (1490–1527), Anabaptist
- Lucas Maius (1522–1598), Protestant theologian and dramatist
- Max Saalmüller (1832–1890), Prussian Lieutenant-Colonel and Lepidopterologist
- Alfred Götze (1865–1948), Prehistorian, honorary citizen 1929
