= Christian Heurich Brewing Company =

Defunct American brewery

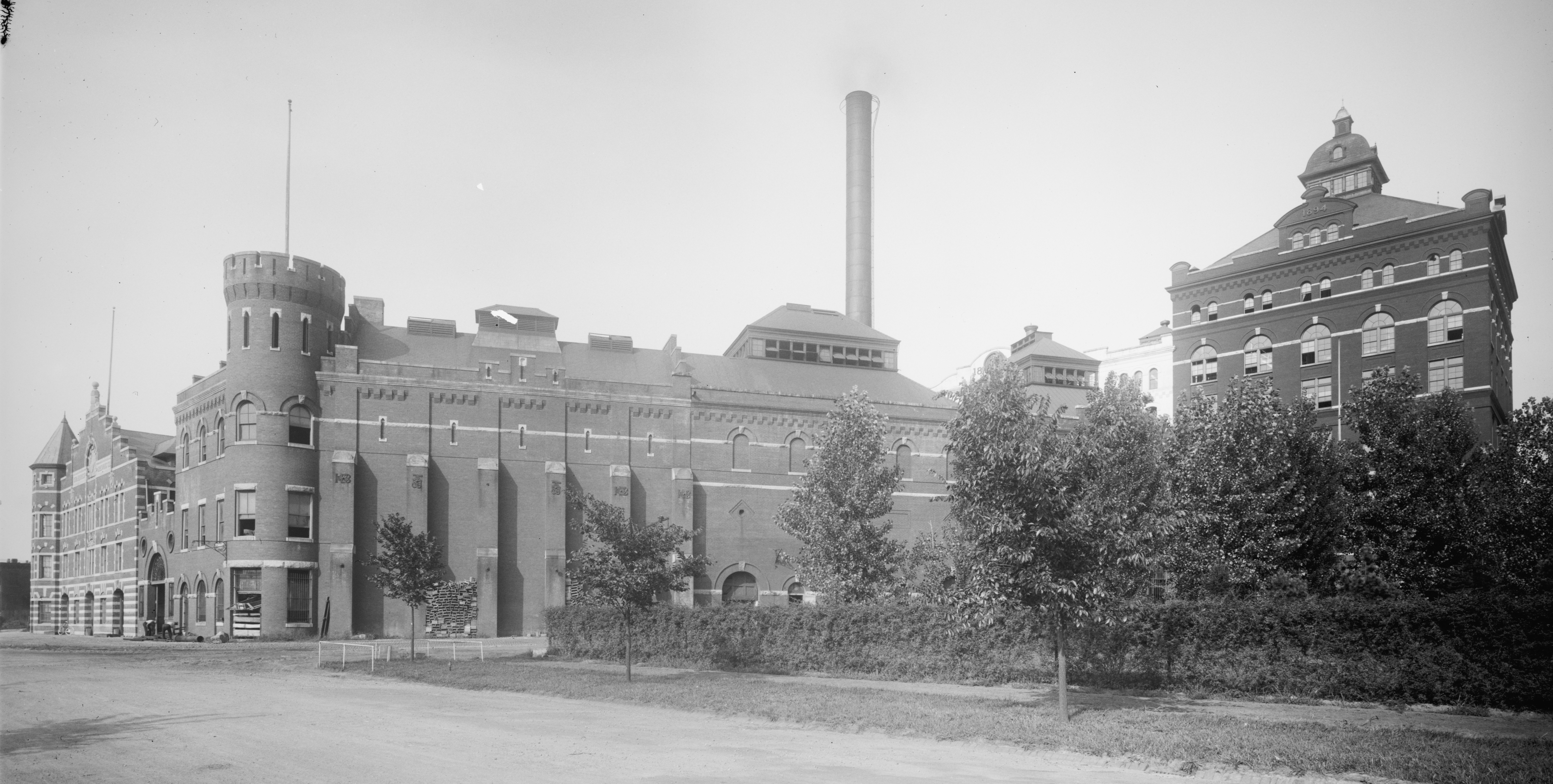
- Heurich Brewery at Foggy Bottom in 1910
- Location: Dupont Circle (20th Street NW) until 1895; 26th Street and D Street NW
- Opened: 1872
- Closed: 1956
- Owner: Christian Heurich

Inactive beers
Name	Type
Senate Lager	American lager
Heurich Lager	American lager
Maerzen Beer	Märzen
Senate Ale (1938)	Pale ale
Senate Bock	Bock

The Christian Heurich Brewing Company was a Washington, D.C., brewery founded in 1872 and incorporated by Christian Heurich in 1890. First located near Dupont Circle on 20th Street NW, it expanded to a much larger site in Foggy Bottom in 1895 after a major fire. The new brewery was located along the Potomac River at 26th Street and D Street NW, where the John F. Kennedy Center for the Performing Arts now stands. The Heurich brewery was the largest in Washington's history, capable of producing 500,000 barrels of beer a year and 250 tons of ice daily.

== History ==
=== Foundation ===
Christian Heurich, a native of Saxe-Meiningen, was born in 1842. He apprenticed as a brewer and butcher, then spent his Wanderjahr working at breweries throughout what is now Austria, Germany, France, and the Czech Republic. In 1866 he migrated to the United States, first living in the Fells Point area of Baltimore with a sister and her husband, then spending time in Chicago, Kansas, and St. Louis before returning to Baltimore. Heurich wanted to start his own brewery but debated where the best opportunity existed. The growing popularity of lager beer was matched by an increasing number of German-owned breweries in the U.S., but many of the major cities already had several existing breweries. Partnering with a fellow German immigrant and coworker, Paul Ritter, Heurich decided upon Washington, DC. The city had expanded radically in size during the American Civil War (1861–1865), and a new city government worked to improve the capital city, to make it a world-class capital city. Led by Vice-chair of the city's five-person Board of Public Works, "Boss" Alexander Robey Shepherd, the foul canal which ran down what is now Constitution Avenue was filled in, roads were paved, and sewer and water lines were installed. The frantic pace of improvement soon attracted the ire of Congress, and the independent DC Government was eliminated. However, Shepherd's improvements did make the city more attractive to newcomers, including Heurich and as many as a dozen other brewers.

In the autumn of 1872, Heurich and Ritter rented the Schnell Brewery and Tavern on 20th Street NW between M and N Streets for $1,600 a year. Founded by George Schnell in 1864, the brewery produced Weißbier in limited qualities, mostly sold and consumed at the brewery's attached restaurant and beer garden. The new partners switched to lager beer and added new equipment to replace the old. Heurich did the brewing while Ritter managed the business. The partners soon had a falling-out for reasons neither fully explained. Heurich took over the brewery, while Ritter moved to Cumberland, Maryland to found his own. Heurich's sister Elisabeth moved to Washington from Baltimore to help her brother run his new company. She also pressed her brother to marry. He proposed to Amelia Mueller Schnell, George Schnell's widow. She accepted, and the two were married in September 1873.

=== Growth ===
Heurich's brewery expanded and prospered, despite the economy of the 1870s suffering from the Long Depression (1873–1879). He improved and expanded the brewery, employing twenty men and a half-dozen delivery teams by 1878. In July 1878, he threw a party for a thousand guests to celebrate his vastly expanded brewery, still on 20th Street. The long hours and hard work took their toll on Christian and Amelia. She suffered a long series of illnesses, and in 1884, Amelia died of pneumonia at age forty-four. Devastated, Heurich lost himself in his work. He also began taking trips to Europe to take the cure, returning to Germany to visit a spa at Elgersburg, in Saxe-Gotha.

In 1887, Heurich married again. His second wife was Mathilde Daetz, the sister of August Daetz, the brewery's secretary and treasurer. A German native, Mathilde had moved to the U.S. in 1886. The couple enjoyed a happy marriage, although when Mathilde lost her unborn child in 1889. She began suffering from a series of illnesses and was injured when thrown from a horse-drawn carriage. Mathilde died at age thirty-three in January 1895, leaving Heurich a widower for a second time even as his brewery continued to prosper and expand. The brewery had several fires, including a major one in 1892 that convinced Heurich that he needed to build a larger, fire-proof facility. The area around the brewery on 20th Street NW was rapidly gentrifying and industrial facilities such as breweries no longer fit the area. Heurich decided to build a new, larger brewery in Foggy Bottom as well as to build a new mansion as a home for Mathilde. Construction on both began in 1894, but Mathilde died soon after her new home was completed.

Heurich's new brewery opened in 1895 on Water Street in Foggy Bottom. It had a total capacity of 500,000 barrels a year, although even at its height, it did not produce that much. It also included an ice plant that could make 150 tons of ice daily, used for lagering his beer and servicing a home delivery ice business. In 1897 he added a bottling line. Heurich also set up bottling plants in Norfolk and Baltimore. His business centered in DC, Virginia, and Maryland, and Heurich did not become one of the large shipping breweries like Pabst, Christian Moerlein, Schlitz, or Anheuser-Busch. Heurich did, however, dominate the local market, and his brewery was DC's largest.

=== DC's Largest Brewery ===
By the mid-1890s, Christian Heurich was the largest brewery in the nation's capital. Incorporated in Virginia, it sold Senate Lager, Heurich Lager, and Maerzen Beer, as well as a bock beer sold in the spring. Heurich's new mansion on New Hampshire Avenue was completed and joined the other mansions in the now upscale DuPont Circle neighborhood. His old brewery, which no longer fit in the area, was demolished, and the land was sold. Heurich, now a successful businessman in his 50s, married for a third time to a niece of his first wife. Amelia Keyser was thirty-three when they married in 1899. In this marriage, Heurich fathered the children he long wanted, including his oldest, Christian Heurich, Jr., who took over the brewery when his father died.

In 1900 Heurich and Amelia traveled to the 1900 Paris World's Fair, where his Senate Beer won a silver medal. In 1905 he won a gold medal at the Liège World's Fair and another gold at the 1907 Jamestown Exposition in Jamestown, Virginia. He also fought several battles with labor unions and his fellow brewers. Heurich usually hired union labor but balked at being told what to do. In 1904 the other DC brewers united against him in a "beer war" when Heurich abandoned an agreement not to sell his beer below a specific price. For three years, the other brewers, especially Albert Carry's Washington Brewery Company, tried with the aid of some local unions to force saloon-keepers to stop carrying Heurich's products. The effort failed, partly because many local unions did not see why labor should aid one group of businesses in forcing a price-fixing agreement on another. Moreover, Heurich had a better relationship with the local unions than the other brewers. Of course, the saloon-keepers favored Heurich's lower prices. By 1907 the "Beer War" had petered out, and Heurich's Brewery remained the largest in DC.

=== The Dry years ===
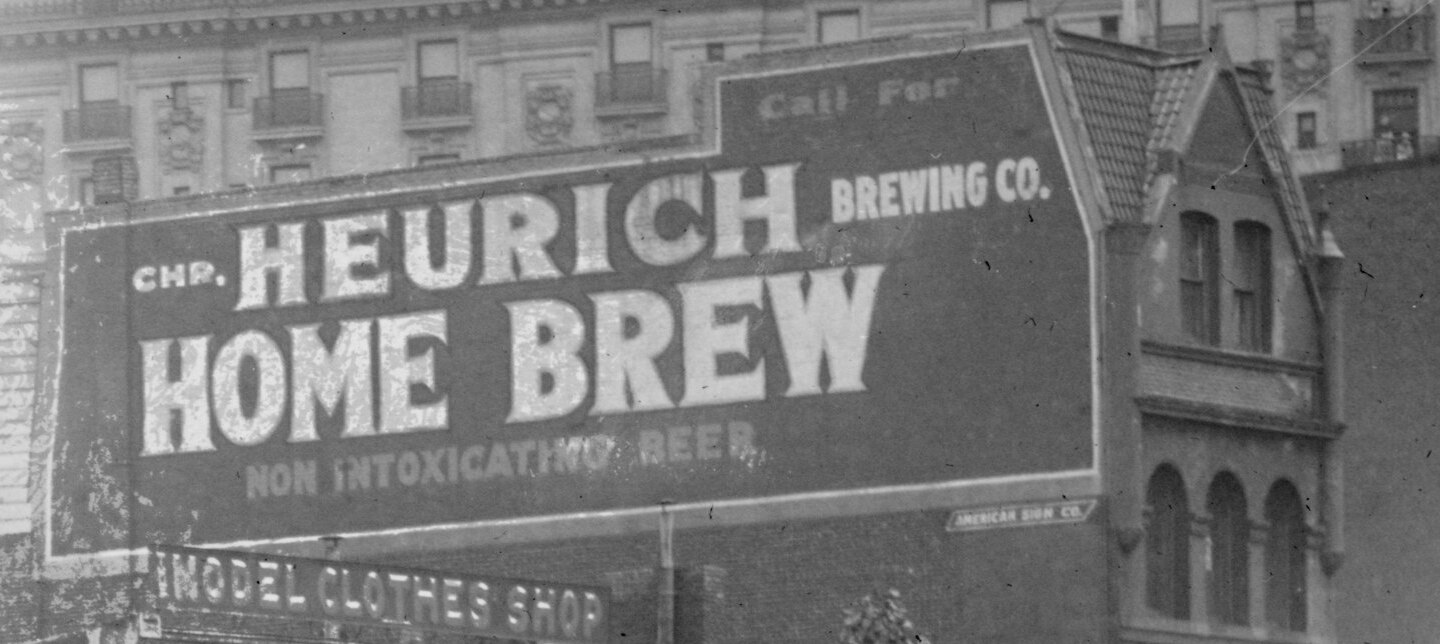
Advertisement for Heurich Home Brew in 1916

Groups such as the Woman's Christian Temperance Union (WCTU) and the Anti-Saloon League were gaining support in their campaign to ban making and drinking alcoholic beverages. Heurich had little regard for them, thinking them fanatics, but they were making inroads into his market, particularly Virginia. Virginia's prohibitionists were slowly making the state dry through local referendums and licensing laws. Heurich reacted the same way many other brewers did, by trying to market his product as a healthy beverage, and trying to make beer appear family-friendly. In late 1913 Heurich introduced a low-alcohol product, Home Beer. It contained less than 2% alcohol and was marketed as suitable for women and "others with a weak stomach." In 1914 the brewery began offering a cookbook for free in exchange for coupons that came with each case of beer. The back cover of the cookbook advertised Home Beer.

Such efforts were in vain. In 1914 Virginia voted to go dry in a statewide referendum beginning in November 1916. In March 1917 the US Congress passed a law making DC dry as of November 1, 1917. Heurich tried making a non-alcoholic apple drink named "Liberty Apple Champagne." Something went wrong, however, and the drink fermented in storage, making it illegal to sell. As of midnight, Halloween night 1917, DC went dry. Heurich noted, "my brewery business was wiped out in that single gesture . . . an investment of over a million dollars was hamstrung." Not wanting to throw his employees out of work, Heurich kept the brewery running to make ice and even won the contract to supply the US Senate and the US Supreme Court with their ice.

=== Rebirth ===
The brewery remained closed from 1917 until 1933, with only the ice plant operating. Heurich was seventy-five years old when it closed. He was the city's biggest landowner, aside from the federal government. He had a farm in Maryland which he enjoyed, raising dairy cows and spending time with his children and grandchildren. However, he resented the closing of his business, and when Prohibition grew less popular, he considered reopening it.

Prohibition did end in 1933. The Eighteenth Amendment banned "intoxicating" beverages. Still, it was the Volstead Act that defined "intoxicating" as ½ of one percent alcohol by weight. The Cullen–Harrison Act, passed on March 21, 1933, legalized the sale of beer and wine with an alcohol content of no more than 3.2% by weight, to be effective April 7, 1933. Breweries rushed to start producing beer again before April 7, "New Beers Day". Heurich did not rush, and when beer was legal again in DC, his was not ready. Only one of his pre-Prohibition competitors, Abner-Drury Brewery, reopened. Unfortunately for consumers, many breweries, including Abner-Drury, rushed their products to market too soon, and the resulting "green (insufficiently aged) beer" turned off customers. Heurich waited for his beer to age properly, soon becoming DC's only remaining brewery. When the Twenty-First Amendment was ratified in December 1933, breweries began producing beers with higher volumes of alcohol.

First, he had to deal with vats full of Liberty Apple Champagne. It had too high an alcohol content to sell under the new rules, and only a vinegar company was interested in buying it. Too proud to sell his product as vinegar, Heurich had it dumped into the sewers to drain into the Potomac River. Now he could start making beer again. The brewery began producing the pre-war brands: Senate Lager, Heurich Lager, and Maerzen Beer. It also produced the spring Bock beer and even Home Beer. Soon, however, Senate Beer became the brewery's mainstay, its flagship label. In late 1938 Heurich introduced a Senate Ale. In late 1939 the brewery began packaging Senate Beer, Ale, and then Bock in beer cans, which were becoming increasingly popular. In 1940 Heurich celebrated his 75th anniversary as a brewer (counting his years as an apprentice and working before he came to DC.) Almost 100 years old, he was now DC's only brewer and one of the most prominent businessmen in town. Senate Beer dominated the local market; Senate Ale and Senate Bock were also popular.

The Christian Heurich Brewing Company had the first company-sponsored professional basketball works team in the revived version of the American Basketball League.

=== Closure ===
The Christian Heurich Brewing Co. closed in 1956, "because of a decline in sales and because of the knowledge that the government would seek to acquire the site of the brewery for the approaches to the new Theodore Roosevelt Bridge."

For five years, Arena Stage staged productions in the former brewery, which it nicknamed "The Old Vat." The brewery and all of its buildings were torn down in 1961.

=== Olde Heurich Brewing Company ===
Heurich's grandson, Gary Heurich, would resurrect the Heurich brand as the Olde Heurich Brewing Company in Utica, New York in 1986. He developed a Foggy Bottom label and reproduced the Old Georgetown and Senate beers produced by the old company. The Olde Heurich Brewing Company would ultimately shut down in 2006.

== See also ==
- List of breweries in Washington, D.C.
- List of defunct breweries in the United States
