= List of breweries in Washington, D.C. =

This is a list of breweries in Washington, D.C.

== List of breweries ==
=== Active ===
- DC Brau Brewing

=== Defunct ===
- Abner-Drury Brewery
- Christian Heurich Brewing Company
- Metropolitan Lager Bier Brewery
- National Capital Brewing Company
- Schnell Brewery
- Juenemann Brewery
- Washington Brewery Company

== See also ==
- List of breweries in Maryland
- List of breweries in Virginia
- List of breweries in the United States
