= Flag of Washington, D.C. =

Flag of the District of Columbia

District of Columbia
- Use: Civil and state flag
- Proportion: 1∶2
- Adopted: October 15, 1938; 88 years ago
- Design: White field with two red horizontal bars and three red stars above the bars. (Note: In heraldic parlance: Argent two bars Gules, in chief three stars of the second.)
- Designed by: Charles A. R. Dunn (Original Designer); Commissioner Melvin C. Hazen (Official Designer); Arthur E. Du Bois (Official Designer)

The flag of the District of Columbia is the official flag representing the district. Consisting of three red stars above two red bars on a white background, it is an armorial banner based on the coat of arms of Lawrence Washington (George Washington's 3rd great-grandfather) of Sulgrave Manor, Northamptonshire, England, in 1592. This coat of arms was used privately by the president in his home at Mount Vernon. In heraldry, the stars are called mullets and the coat of arms is blazoned as argent two bars gules, in chief three mullets of the second.

In 1938, the District Flag Commission was created by an Act of Congress "to procure a design for a distinctive flag for the District of Columbia". The District Flag Commission was composed of three non-elected federally-appointed members: the president of the Board of Commissioners, the secretary of war and the secretary of the Navy. The flag was selected by the commission with the help of the Commission of Fine Arts. Since no local group was involved in the selection process, Washingtonians saw the flag as a symbol of their lack of representation. More recently, it has been embraced by most DC residents and businesses, as well as the DC Statehood Movement as a symbol of their local identity in the 21st century.

The flag was ranked best with a score of 9.17 in a review of 150 American city flags by the North American Vexillological Association.

== History ==
=== Washington family coat of arms ===
The coat of arms used by the Washington family and currently use as the coat of arms of Washington, D.C.

The Washington family traces its roots to England in the 13th century to Wessyngton, a small rural estate in the northeastern county of Durham where Sir William de Hertburn received a lordship. The original coat of arms evolved drastically over the next 150 years through alliances, land acquisitions and conflicts. In 1346, the first appearance of the family coat of arms as we would recognize it was recorded for Sir William de Wessyngton's great-grandson, but with argent (silver) horizontal bars and mullets on a gules (red) field. By the end of the 14th century, the current design was recorded for the family. After various events, the family was dispersed around England in Buckinghamshire, Kent, Warwickshire and Northamptonshire. In 1592, Robert Cooke, Clarenceux King of Arms confirmed the coat of arms upon Lawrence Washington (1566/68-1616) of Sulgrave Manor in Northamptonshire during the reign of Elizabeth I.

Two grandsons of Lawrence Washington immigrated to English North America in the 1660s. One of them was John Washington, who immigrated to the colony of Virginia in 1656. His great-grandson was George Washington who would become the first president of the United States. George used the coat of arms extensively on his Mount Vernon plantation, including on personal objects and on the livery of his enslaved servants. This was a common practice among the American planter class.

After the United States became independent from Britain in 1783, George Washington started a communication by mail with Sir Isaac Heard, Garter Principal King of Arms of the College of Arms in London on the matter of the coat of arms. This correspondence took place between 1791 and 1796 and appears to have been genealogical and probably also heraldic in nature. The president and the Garter appear to have been working together to trace George Washington's ancestors and the link to the British Isles. Mr. Heard confirmed the events that took place in England regarding his ancestors in a letter dated December 7, 1791. George Washington acknowledged that this was the same coat of arms used in the Colony prior to Independence.

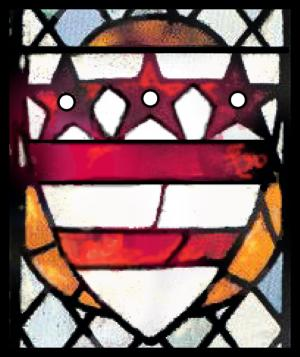
The Washington family coat of arms in 14th-century stained glass at Selby Abbey, North Yorkshire, England

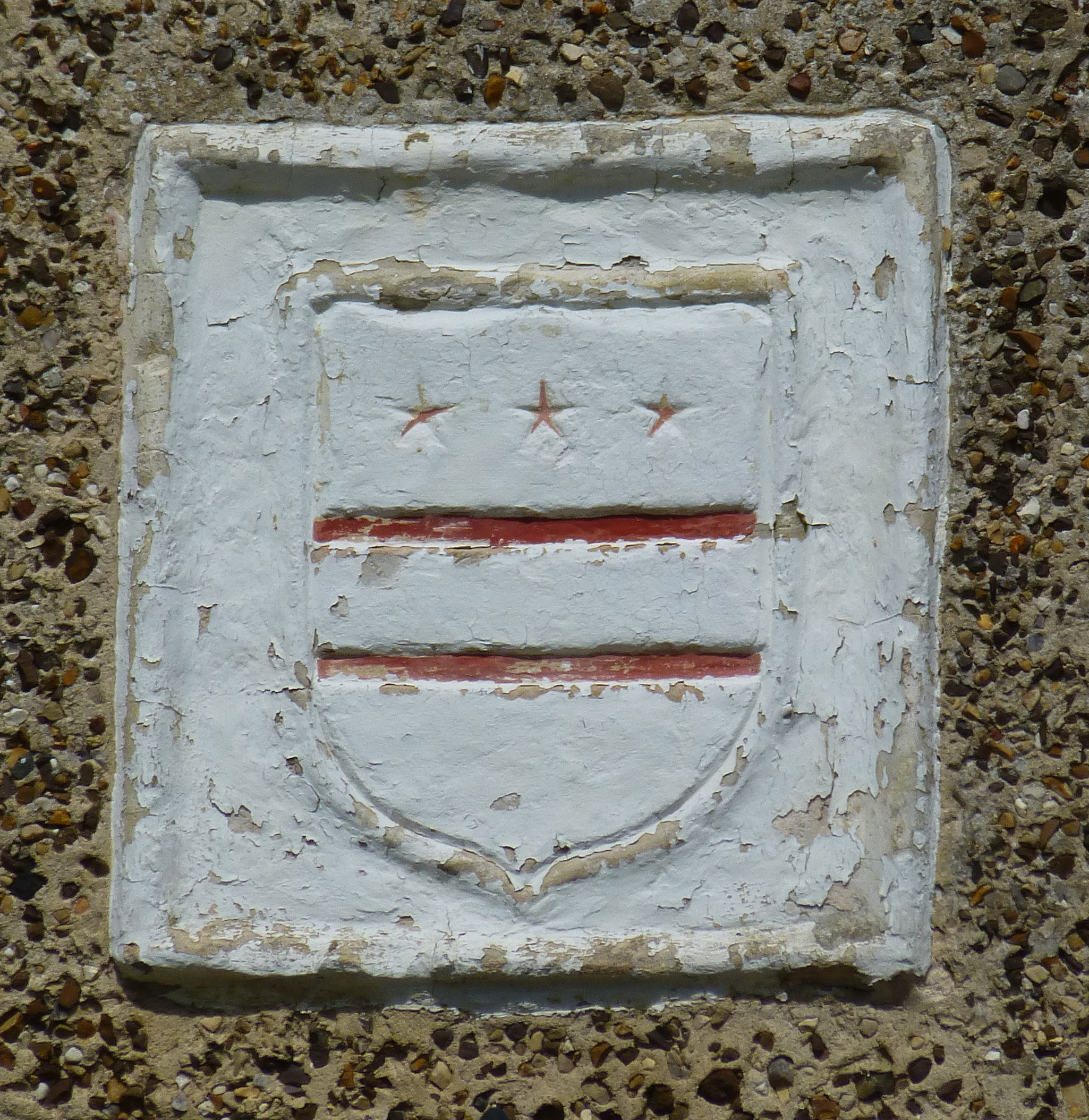
Washington family coat of arms above entrance at Sulgrave Manor, Northamptonshire, England, built by Robert Washington in 1540s

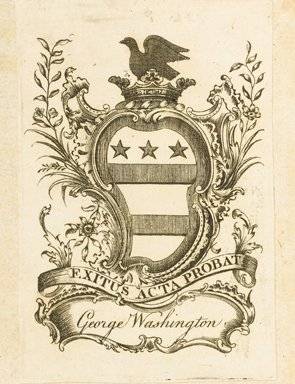
Washington family coat of arms as seen in George Washington's bookplate

=== Early history ===
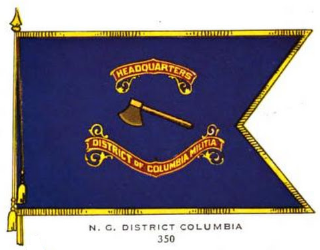
DC National Guards used as the District of Columbia flag in the October 1917 issue of the National Geographic

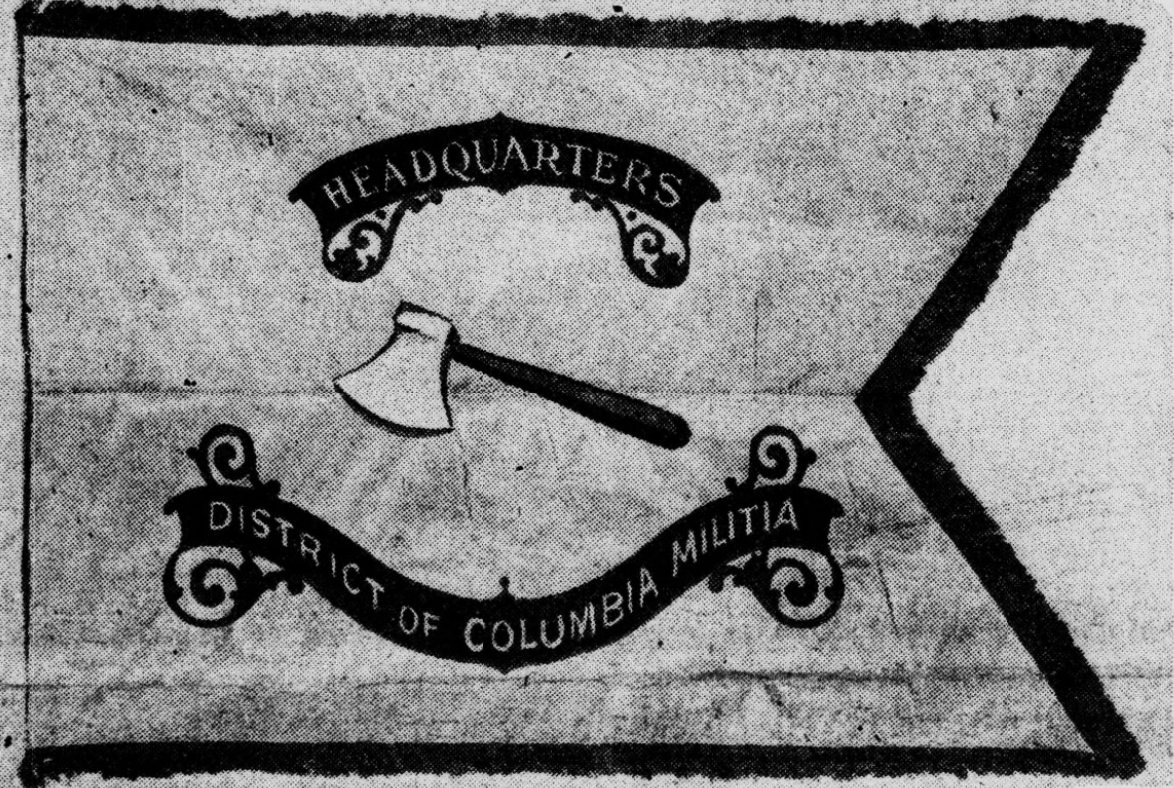
Original flag

Since its creation by Congress on July 9, 1790, by the Residence Act and for over a century, the District of Columbia was without an official flag and flew several unofficial banners, usually the flag of the D.C. National Guard.

In 1874, Colonel R. I. Fleming approved funds to purchased a National and regimental flag for the 1st regiment National Guard. The regimental flag had a blue field with the district's seal in the center. The seal on the flag was differed, it was missing the liberty cap and salute of Washington. The whole thing costed $100 which would be around $2,939 today.

In the early 20th Century, the Thompsen-Bryan-Ellis Company was a firm of printers working on a flag book under the direction of Lieutenant Commander Byron McCandless who had a great interest in vexillology. The work was then taken over by the National Geographic. It became the now well known "Our Flag Number" (Volume XXXII - Number 4) which contained 1197 flags in full colors and an additional 300 in black and white. On page 335, the National Guard's flag is shown as the representation of the District of Columbia. It showed a blue flag with two banners on it: one above with the word "Headquarters" and one below with "District of Columbia Militia" written on it. In between was an axe. The flag was made by General Harris and later displayed over his headquarters in 1897.

One of the artists working on the project was Charles A. R. Dunn. While drawing some of the flags, he noticed the lack of good design for many of the state flags with many simply being the state seal on a blue field. He also realized that the District of Columbia did not have a flag. He started thinking about designing a flag for the capital. He was very attracted to the design of the neighboring state flag of Maryland which used the arms of Lord Baltimore. It was only natural that he would remain in the field of heraldry for the inspiration of his design.

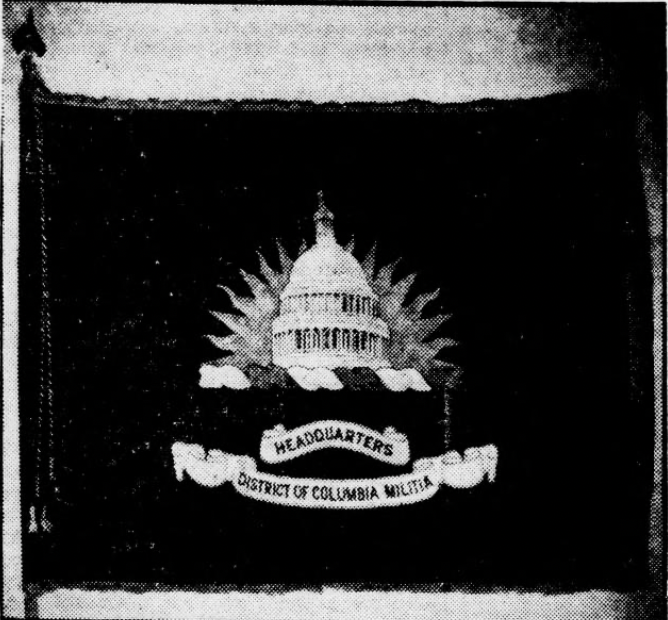
D.C. National Guard's flag, 1933

The flag was phased out in 1937, for one that displayed the capitol inside a sunburst on a red and white bar.

=== Early designs ===
In 1902, Chairman Warner of Grand Army of the Republic wrote a letter to Commissioner Macfarland asking about a District flag. Macfarland wrote back a proposing a flag that was described as having stripes of red, white and blue, bearing the District's seal in the center with the motto: "Justitia Omnibus."

In 1921, Dunn had moved on to work for the Chamber of Commerce of the United States. While working in the Mills Building, he drew a design for the flag in the office studio. He took the design directly from the coat of arms which belonged to the Washington family with no change to the design but did not release it at the time.

On February 8, 1924, the Daughters of the American Revolution managed to get a bill introduced in Congress to set up a commission to select a design. It was introduced by Chairman Reed of the House District Committee. The commission would be composed of the president of the United States, the secretary of war and the president of the board of commissioners of the district. It would have an appropriation of $1,500. On February 20, 1924, the Evening Star published a proposed design by John Mackaye Dunbar. It featured the shield portion of the coat-of-arms on a red field with a blue cross. While this design was not endorsed by the D.A.R., they appreciated its display of "simplicity" in their February 24 meeting. They confirmed that their research that the Militia flag with an ax had been used as a flag but was not an appropriate flag for the district. They further rejected the idea of having the seal of the District of Columbia be part of the design for a flag due to its complexity. Charles Moore, the chairman of the Fine Arts Commission who had been consulted on the drafting of the bill, also agreed that the design should be simple and should emphasize in some way that the district is the seat of the central government of all the states.

Charles Dunn's 1924 proposed design for the district flag

In February of that year, Charles Dunn submitted a set of drawings in black and white and in color to the Evening Star which was published on March 16, 1924. While the charges remained the same (two bars and three mullets) the tinctures had changed from all gules (red) to cobalt blue for the stars and vermilion for the bars. However, the enthusiasm died down soon after and the issue of a District of Columbia flag was not raised again until 1937.

However, some opposition arose from the Southeast Citizens' Association. On March 26, 1924, they adopted a resolution opposing the adoption of a special flag for the District of Columbia. This resolution was apparently adopted after Capt. W.E. Luckett declared "that the only flag the District of Columbia should cherish as its own is the one flag for every American — the Stars and Stripes".

On May 12, 1924, at a gathering of the Federation of Citizen's Associations, an imitation meeting of the federation was staged for the purpose of entertaining the guests present at the event. Meetings were known for their fiery debates and the topic of choice in this piece was the adoption of a flag for the District of Columbia. The "special committee" was headed by Fred S. Walker and James W. Murphy who came forward with the emblem with Jesse C. Suter as a member:

a goat on a field of yellow. In one corner was a pair of manacles for a coat-of-arms denoting the condition of the people of the District. In another corner was drawn a double cross.

The design which would become known as the Jest Flag and was made public again on June 14, 2019 as part of #DCFlagDay as part of a discussion on the history of the DC flag. It is currently in the holdings of the Historical Society of Washington, D.C., and was last displayed in 1960 according to Josh Gibson who found the flag.

District flag design proposed by the Quartermaster General in May 1924

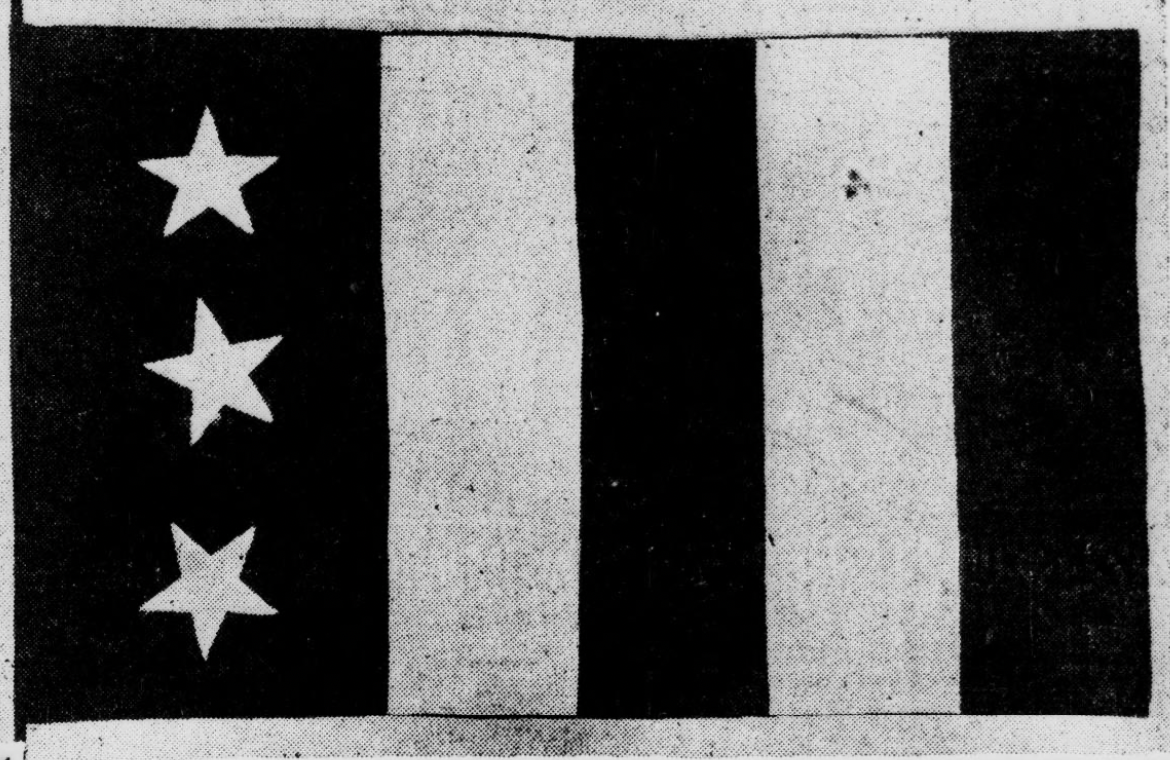
Photo of the Quartermaster General flag, 1925

On May 2, 1924, the Evening Star published a new designed proposed by the Army. It was designed by the Office of the Quartermaster General and was the joint work of Capt. J. Moultrie Ward, Q.M.C. and Flora F. Sherwood, the Quartermaster Corps civilian artist. While they used the arms of George Washington in part of the flag and its two colors, it was very different. The first third, next to the hoist, consisted of a broad red strip with three white five-pointed stars aligned vertically in its center. They represented the three cities originally in its boundaries: Washington City, Georgetown and Alexandria. The remainder of the flag was composed of four stripes aligned veritably and alternating white and red ending with red on its edge.

The Senate passed the bill on May 5, 1924, and it made its way to the House of Representatives. On May 7, 1924, the Native Washingtonians for a Banquet for the organizations fifth anniversary. During his presentation, the president of the society Jesse C. Suter showed the audience the version of the district flag that was presented a few weeks later and explained its meaning:

a yellow border and on it a goat, a pair of handcuffs and a double cross. [...] The handcuffs were symbolic of the freedom enjoyed by the District. The goat and double cross [...] speak more or less for themselves, while the yellow is symbolic of the lemon which the District is continually having handed it under the present system of government."

However, it seems the bill never made it through to become law. A decade later, the question reappeared. On September 16, 1934, Frederic Adrian Delano, chairman of the National Capital Planning Commission and the uncle of President Franklin D. Roosevelt unveiled his design for a district flag. His version was based on the American flag with the same 13 stripes. In place of the stars a map of Washington when the city was first projected in 1792 was added and was surrounded by pictures of the Capitol, the White House, the Lincoln Memorial, Mount Vernon, the Supreme Court Building, the Lee Mansion and the Amphitheater at Arlington, the Dumbarton House in Georgetown and the Masonic Memorial and Christ Church in Alexandria. In the four corners were four American eagles. The map design was originally drawn by Mildred G. Burrage at his suggestion and was known as the handkerchief map. The design was copyrighted by the American Civic Association of which Mr. Delano was president. Printed in six colors, the handkerchiefs were sold for $1 each and the proceeds were used for the George Washington Memorial Parkway fund.

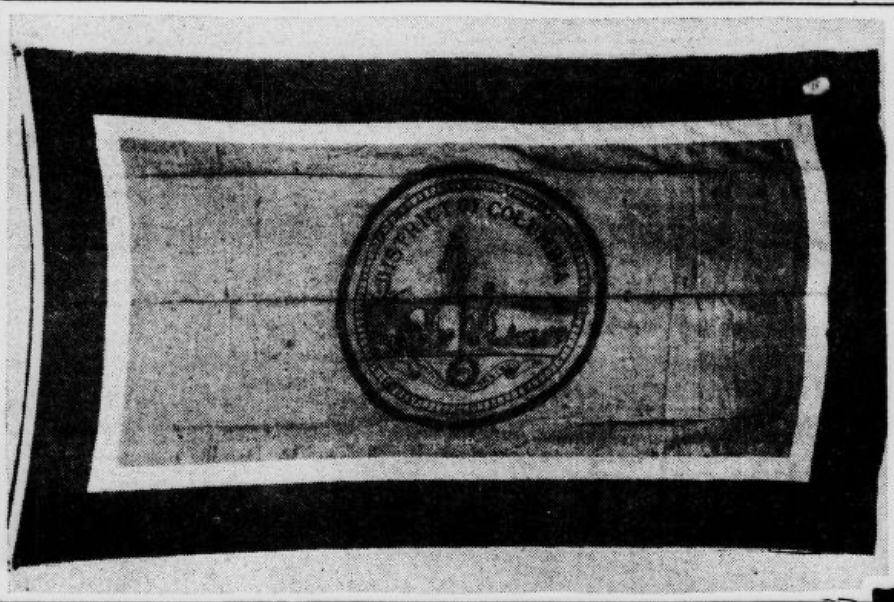
William E. Russells flag, 1925

In 1925, The Merchants and Manufacturers Association of D.C. wanted to used a District flag, they inquired about its whereabouts. Finding that there was not an official flag a man named William E. Russells made his own. The flag had a blue border with a buff field in the center with a thin white line in between blue and buff. In the center of the field was the district's seal in blue. The flag was used by the association and later carried in a 4th of July and military parade. Another one was made for the George Washington University but differs in design. 2 other associations in the district used unofficial district flags, with one of them being described as bearing the head of George Washington.

=== Creation of the District Flag Commission ===
By 1938, the D.A.R. had been campaigning for a district flag for over a decade. The effort was being spearheaded by the local D.A.R. Committee on Correct Use of the Flag. In 1937, the local Chapter was asked to present a district flag to Dahlgren Hall at the United States Naval Academy in Annapolis, Maryland to be hung along the flags of the 48 states (the states of Alaska and Hawaii did not join the Union until 1959) provided by state societies for Navy Day. The state chairman of the Flag Committee reached out to the district commissioner who was unable to provide one since it did not exist. Through extensive lobbying to Congress, the search for a suitable flag was pushed forward.

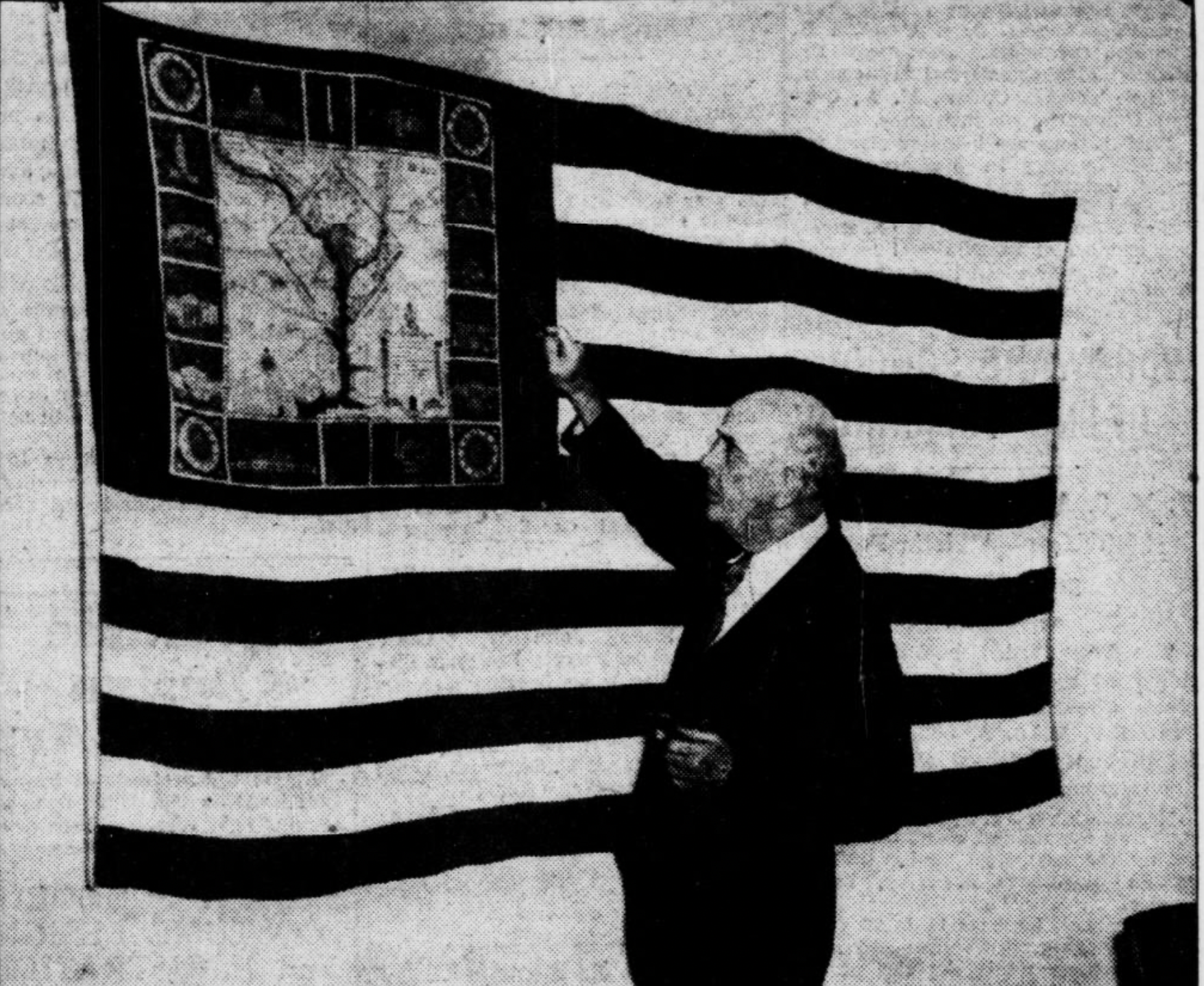
Frederic A. Delano proposed District flag, 1934

On June 16, 1938, Congress requested by an act that the secretary of war, the secretary of the Navy and the president of the Board of Commissioners of the District of Columbia create "a commission to procure a design for a distinctive flag for the District of Columbia, the Seat of the Capital of the Nation". The selection of the design shall have the advice of the Commission of Fine Arts. The bill was signed into law by President Franklin D. Roosevelt on the same day.

The commission included the president of the Board of Commissioners Melvin C. Hazen, the secretary of war Harry H. Woodring and the secretary of the Navy Claude A. Swanson. They held a meeting on July 9, 1938 to discuss the plans of choosing a design. The Evening Star stated at the time that this was a first step for the people of Washington toward the district's sovereignty which would include the right to vote. It was hoped that this was a sign of concession to come on the matter. At the time, the district commissioner was appointed by the president of the United States as were the two secretaries as part of the Cabinet. It was not until 1975 that DC residents voted for their mayor.

An announcement was made in the newspapers of a contest open to the public to submit design and ideas for the flag. The Heraldic Division of the War Department laid some heraldry and visibility rules. Arthur E. Du Bois was the heraldic expert of the Quartermaster General's Office and sat on the commission as an adviser. The secretary of war and the secretary of the Navy did not appear to actually be present on the commission but were represented by members of their staff.

=== Design submissions and selection ===
Charles Dunn submitted his 1921 design with the Washington coat of arms with all the charges in their original tincture of gules (red) in June 1938. In addition to the flag itself, he proposed the use of a Washington coat of arms in the canton (which he erroneously called a jack) for local organizations such as the American Legion. The organization would then use the rest of the space (the field) on the flag for their own emblem.

The Daughter of the American Revolution design presented by Ethel Leibsohn and designed by Mrs. George T. Hawkins

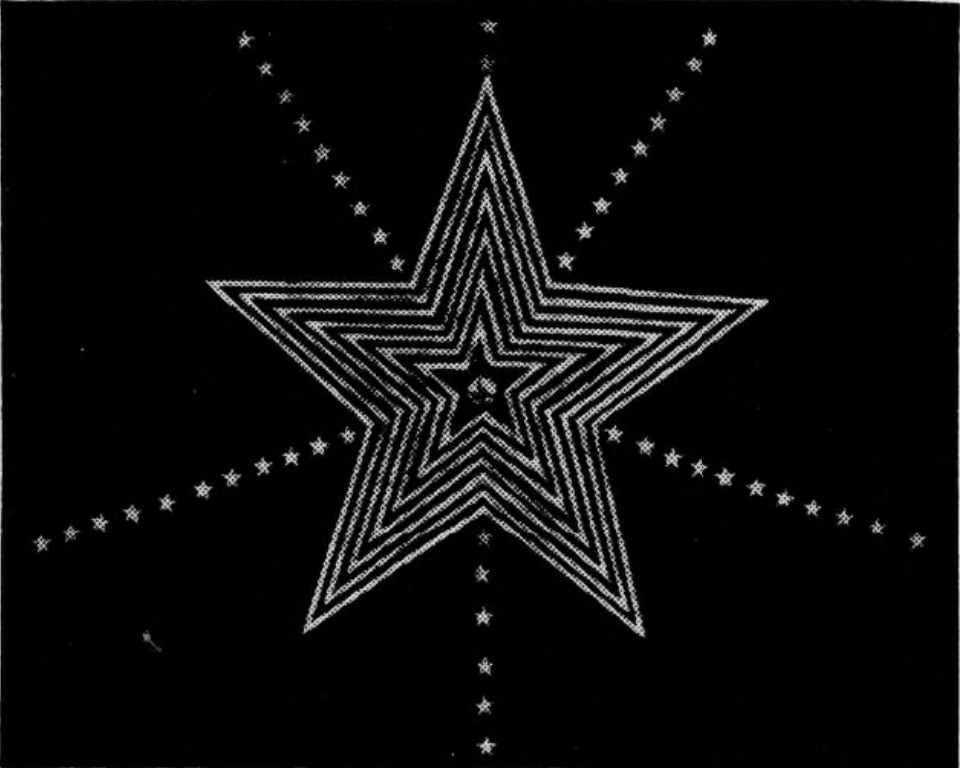
Proposed flag from March of 1938

On August 24, 1938, the Evening Star announced that the commission had met to review the designs. They were down to two submissions mentioned by name. The first one was Charles Dunn's design using Washington's coat of arms. The second was a submission by the American Liberty Chapter of the Daughters of the American Revolution and designed by one of its members, Mrs. George T. Hawkins. On a blue background, a big gold star made up of 13 concentric lines representing the original Thirteen Colonies with the Capitol Building in the center. The star is encircled by 48 small gold stars representing the states in the Union. The words "DISTRICT OF COLUMBIA" written in gold could be added or removed from the bottom. A flag of Dunn's design was made and a display board of Hawkins design were shown to the reporters present at the announcement. Both designs were submitted to the Commission of Fine Arts for final review as the commission "admitted a deadlock". The Fine Arts' meeting would take place in September.

=== Formal requests for local selection involvement ===
However, the Commission of Fine Arts had to delay the review as it wanted to study all of the 50-odd designs and some had not yet arrived as of September 3 when the meeting took place. The review was pushed by two weeks to the next meeting. In addition, the Evening Star reported that the process of selecting the design was being questioned among those active in civic affairs. It was suggested that the Commission of Fine Arts use a more democratic process. This selection was "seen as a real opportunity to arouse interest and civic spirit through giving this voteless and unrepresented community an opportunity to have a part in the selection of the community colors under which it will in the future march with pride and devotion".

The question of what the flag should represent was also discussed. The Evening Star asked the question in these terms: "what do any of the designs under consideration symbolize?" Some citizens asked the same question. In their September 8, 1938 meeting, the Association of Oldest Inhabitants asked that the Commission of Fine Arts collaborate with a special committee of native Washingtonians as they felt left out. On a letter to the commissioner they stated their concerns:

Our association believes that such a flag, in order to be appropriate and truly representative of the District, must have some definite local significance. The designs under consideration appear to us to be symbolic of national rather than local sentiment. If it is to be our District of Columbia flag, surely District citizens should have a part in the selection of the design.

The Federation of Citizens' Association joined in this movement in early October. They requested that the Commission of Fine Arts give them the privilege to co-operate with them to the selection of the design. A special committee was to be appointed to seek this. A letter from the Association of Oldest Inhabitants to the Federation of Citizens' Association was sent on October 5, 1938 requesting that both groups collaborate on the selection of the design. The Kalorama Association sided with the other two associations on October 11 as they sent a letter to the commission recommending that the choice of the design be left to the residents of the district.

=== Selection of the final design ===
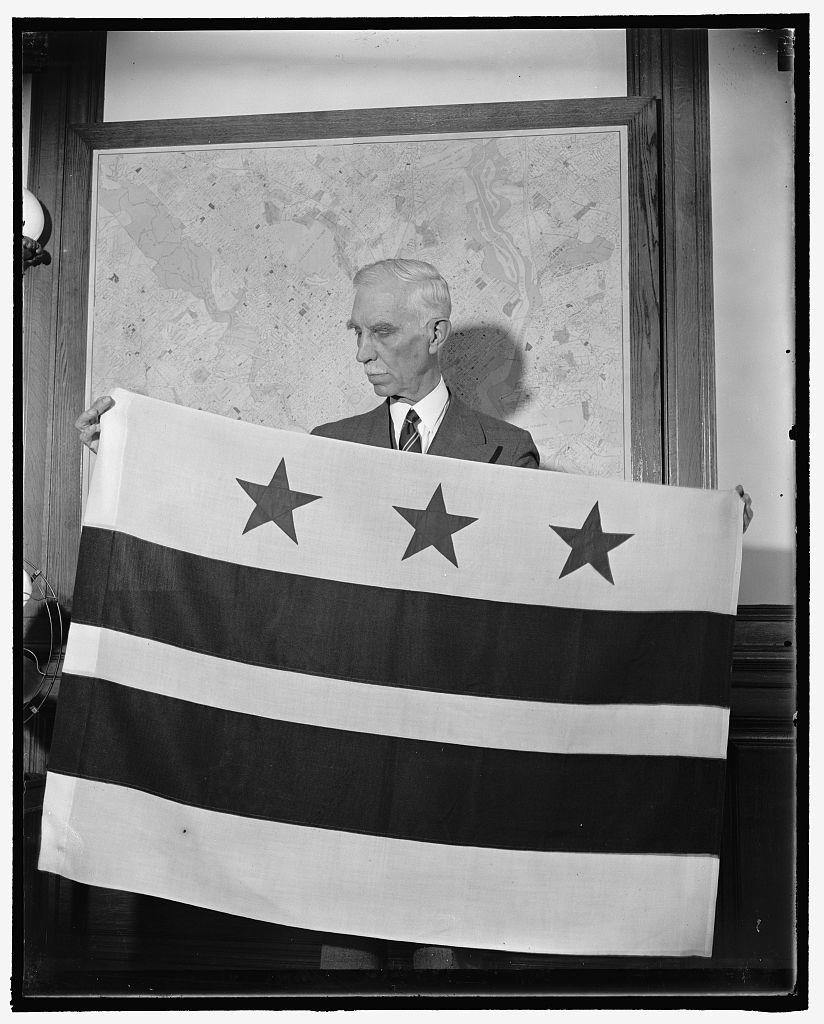
Commissioner Melvin C. Hazen holding the district flag selected by his commission in October 1938

On October 15, 1938, the Evening Star announced that a new flag has been adopted by the District Flag Commission and the Fine Arts Commission. After reviewing 50 designs, Washington's coat of arms was selected. The design was described as "paying honors to George Washington using the major elements of the emblem features of the family shield of the first President".

No longer will the District be ignominiously anonymous in times of patriotic events, parades and other celebrations where every State of the Union has its flag.

— Commissioner Melvin C. Hazen

The following specifications were adopted:

The proportions of the design are prescribed in terms of the hoist, or vertical height, of the flag as follows: the upper white portion shall be 3/10 of the hoist; the two horizontal bars are each 2/10 of the hoist; the white area between the bars 1/10 of the hoist; and the base, or lowest white space, is 2/10 of the hoist. The three five-pointed stars have a diameter of 2/10 of the hoist and are spaced equidistant in the fly, or horizontal, dimension of the flag.

=== Design explanation and failure to credit local input ===
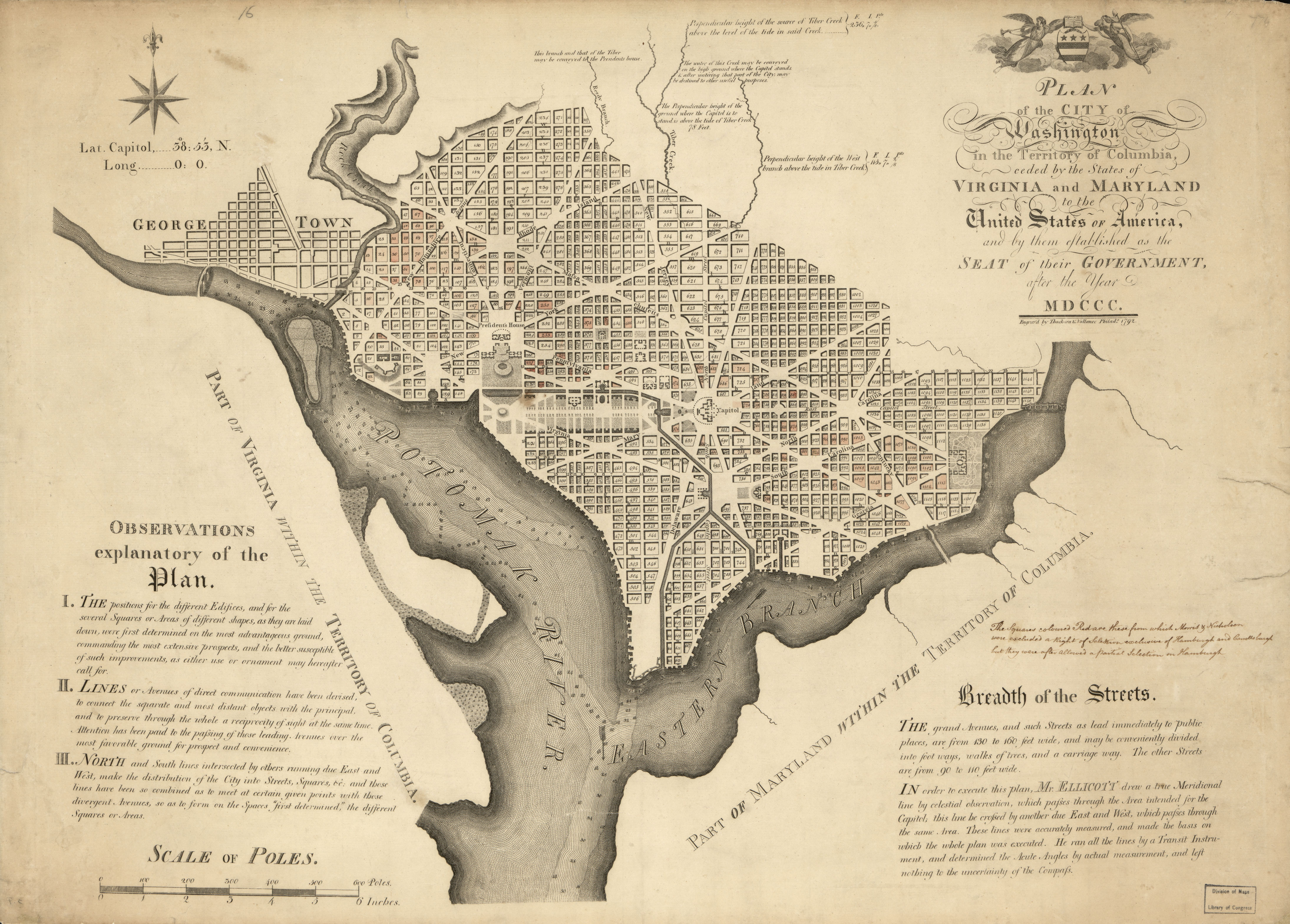
The 1792 map quoted by Commissioner Hazen for the basis of the design

On October 16, all the details of the selections were given to the press and explained. It was explained that the commissioner, who was the former district surveyor, recalled seeing the coat of arms on a shield on old maps. Upon research, a map by Andrew Ellicott engraved in 1792 by Thackara & Vallance in Philadelphia was found. The direct association of the first president with the establishment of the district and the capital district bearing his name was sufficient to justify using heraldic symbolism in the flag to illustrate the historical connection. In his view, it explained why several designs included this idea.

Mr. Hazen was credited for having "brought to attention the basic elements of the simplified Washington shield" while Arthur E. Du Bois was credited for the details of the final design. Apart from the mention that many designs included these features and that 50 designs were submitted, there was no recognition of the contribution of the local residents in the process. He responded to the failure to include the local population (directly or through the civic associations) by stating that anyone interested could submit a design and that it would have been reviewed. No mention of Charles Dunn's contribution was made at the time. His contribution was made public in 1957, when he published an article in the Records of the Columbia Historical Society entitled The Origins of the District of Columbia Flag where he reveals the process that took place from his point of view. When he died in 1978, his contribution was not mentioned.

Commissioner Hazen also announced that the flag could first be flown at the Inter-American Horse Show at Meadowbrook Farm, in Montgomery County, Maryland, on October 23, 1938, which would be designated as District Day. The commissioner was one of the sponsors of the Show. However, the flag was first flown on October 18, 1938, on the District Building (now known as the John A. Wilson Building, the district council's offices) under the American flag. The flag measured 6.5 feet (2.0 m) feet by 9.5 feet (2.9 m).

== Designer ==
Today, most sources state that Charles Dunn is the actual designer of the DC flag. It seems all historical accounts come from The Origins of the District of Columbia Flag he published in the Records of the Columbia Historical Society and the August 24, 1938, Evening Star article where he is mentioned as a finalist. However, according to the commission set up by Congress and who had authority to choose the design, Commissioner Melvin C. Hazen is credited as playing a major role in the design and Arthur E. Du Bois as having done the final design. This appears to indicate that Hazen and Du Bois were seen as co-designers at the time. The criticisms that followed the announcement regarding the lack of local involvement seem to confirm that this was the accepted view at the time. The DC Council website no longer states that Dunn is the designer, while it stated it up until 2018 that this was the case.

The link to the Washington coat of arms is undeniable and has been stated by all parties as a source of inspiration for the DC flag. Therefore, from a heraldry perspective, it seems that neither Dunn nor Hazen and Du Bois can lay claim to the design itself as being their own. In addition, as stated by the commissioner himself, the use of the design and its first association with Washington City and the other territories of the District of Columbia dates back to 1792 when it appeared on the Ellicott map only two years after the District of Columbia was created and while President Washington was in office. This exact same design of the arms dates back to at least the 14th century in England and it seems the original designer would have lived at that time. No changes have been made between that time and the design set in 1938.

== Usage ==
=== DC Government ===
Starting in 1916 when the District Building was inaugurated to 1964, the flag of the United States was flown from a large flagpole located on the roof of the building. Due to concerns regarding the safety of the staff during inclement weather, two new poles were installed in front of the building. It was then that, for the first time, the DC flag was flown on the DC Government building grounds on a separate pole. Prior to that, it was flown under the US flag.

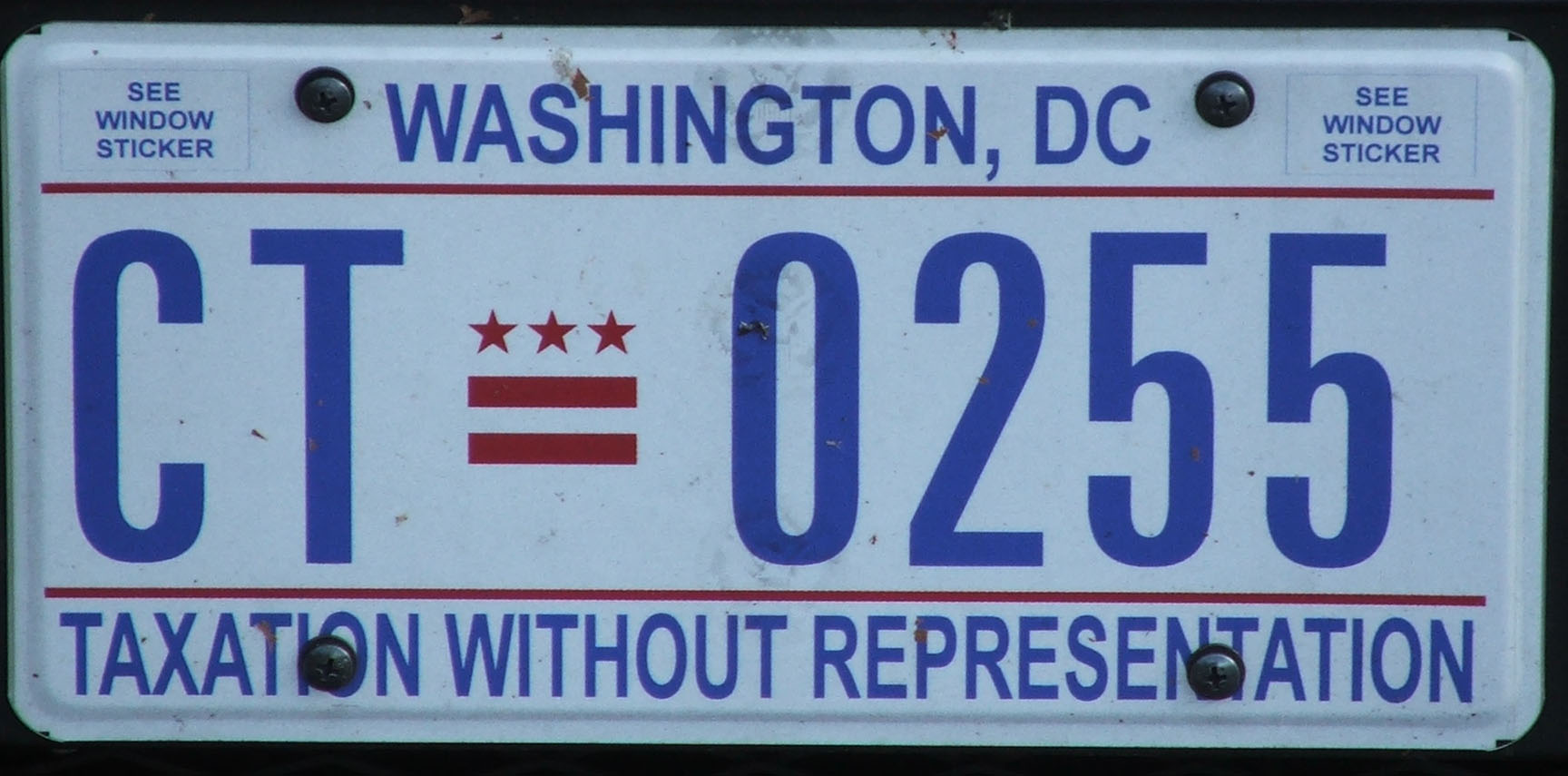
DC license plate in the 2002–2013 design

The flag first appeared on the District of Columbia license plates known as the 1984 Capital City Baseplate starting on October 1, 1984. These plates were issued for new registrations and issued to motorists who had the old 1974 and 1978 series plates. This replacement process took place from October 1984 to September 1986.

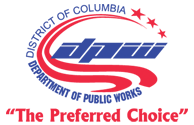
DC Department of Public Works logo featuring the stars and bars

The DC flag is used on all DC Government websites, publications, documents and equipment. It is used extensively on its own or integrated into some of the department logos and program logos. One notable exception is the patch of the Metropolitan Police Department of the District of Columbia which had the Capitol building on it and never had the DC flag on it.

=== Local politics ===
Elements of the design are used extensively in local politics. The three stars and bars or the colors are often used by candidates and causes on their signs during local elections.

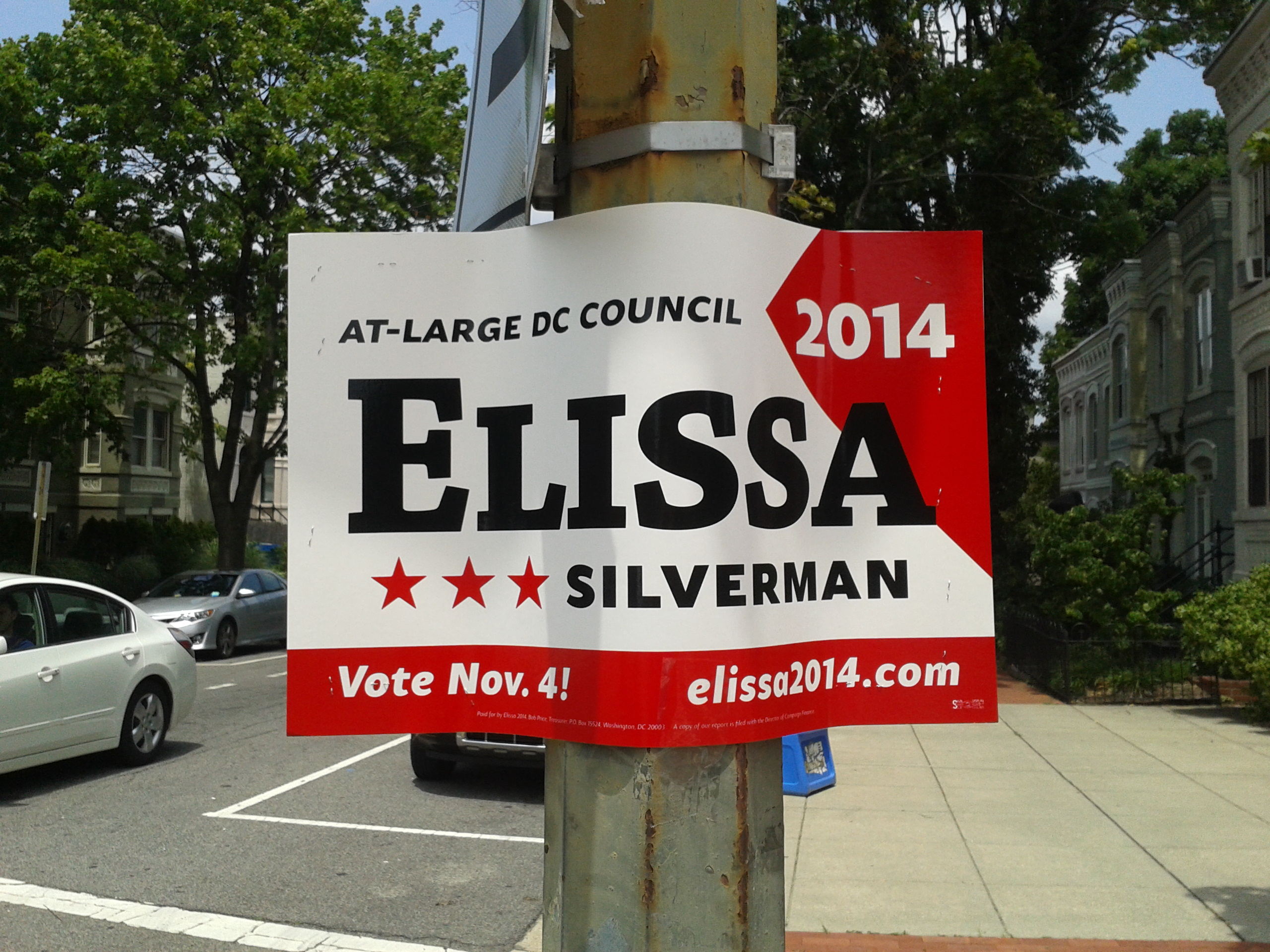
Elissa Sliverman Sign during the 2014 local elections

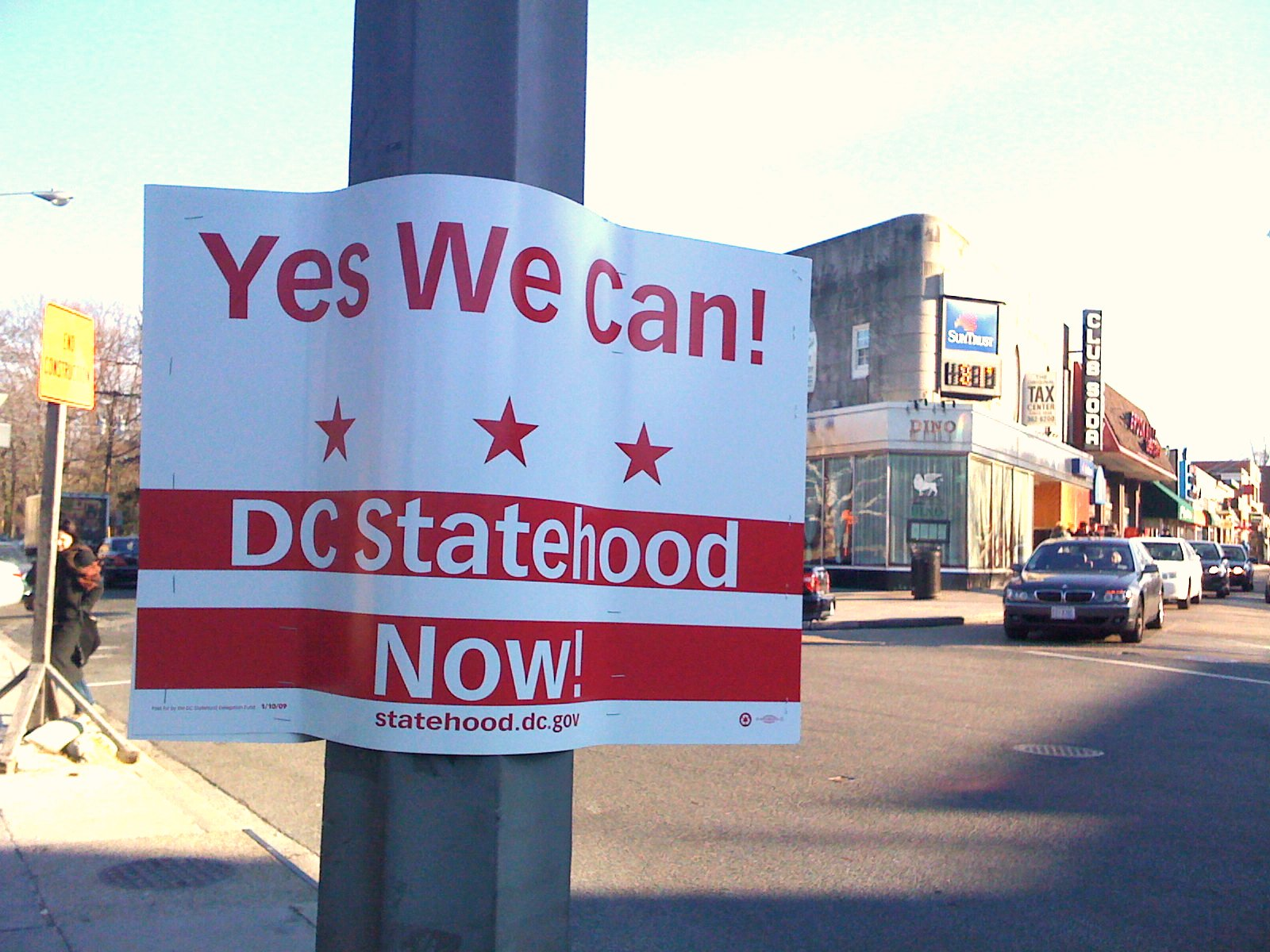
DC Statehood Now sign in 2009

"Taxation without representation" flag

In 2002, the D.C. Council debated a proposal to change the flag in protest of the district's lack of voting rights in Congress. The new design would have added the letters "D.C." to the center star and the words "Taxation Without Representation" in white to the two red bars, a slogan already in use on the district's license plates. The change presumably would have been temporary and revoked once the district achieved equal representation or statehood. It passed the council on a 10–2 vote, but support for the proposal soon eroded, and then-mayor Anthony A. Williams never signed the bill.

In spite of its adoption by a non-elected commission of federally appointed members, the DC flag has become a symbol of local identity and local self-governance in the 21st Century. Today, it is used extensively by the DC Government's Statehood Campaign, activists and citizens fighting for the District of Columbia to become the 51st State of the Union. It is also a non-partisan symbol and is extensively used by all parties in the district including Democrats, Republicans and Green Party in their campaigns and websites.

=== District Council Commemorative Flag Program ===
Starting on June 1, 2017, the D.C. District Council began a new commemorative flag program, which is similar to the United States flag program operated by the Congressional Keeper of the Stationery and requested through a constituent's U.S. senator or U.S. representative. In the case of the DC flag, interested parties can fill out an online form on the DC Council's website providing a credit card or by sending a letter with applicable check or money order to the secretary of the District Council requesting a 3×5 or 4×6 District of Columbia flag; once the request is received a flag is taken and then flown on one of several flagpoles at the John A. Wilson Building. After the flag has been flown it is then packaged and sent to the requester with an accompanying certificate that authenticates the flag was flown at the top of a flagpole at the Wilson Building.

=== DC Flag Day ===
Flag Day is celebrated in the United States on June 14. The Neighbors United for DC Statehood has been organizing the DC Flag Day Photo Contest since 2013 (with the exception of 2016). It celebrates the DC flag and pride while advocating for DC Statehood on their website and on social media using the hashtag #DCFlagDay. In 2018, the contest was organized in several categories:

- Best Ward: given to the Council member to the highest volume of constituent tweets with the flag (won by Ward 6)
- Best Campaign Team: given to the best Campaign team bringing DC Love
- Best Advocacy: for the best photo encouraging a specific House or Senate member not yet cosponsoring the statehood bills in Congress
- Best Group: given to a community group (won by Mayor Muriel Bowser)
- Best Elected Official: given to a local elected official (won by Brianne Nadeau)
- Best Agency: given to a local Government Agency (won by DOEE)
- Best Business: given to a business promoting the DC flag and its business
- Best Non-Profit: given to a non-profit representing the love of Washington, DC and their organization (won by DC Vote)
- Artistic Expression: given for the most artistic photo
- Best Pet: given for the "most cute, quirky, or compelling photo of a non-human living thing"
- Best Friend in a State: given to a person or group from one of the 50 states imploring their Representative or Senator to support the Statehood Movement or thank them for doing so (won by Eleanor Norton)
- Best Statehood Shot: given for the best photo symbolic of the fight for statehood (won by Charles Allen)

=== Voter's Guide upside-down flag incident ===
On October 16, 2014, ahead of the November 4 elections, it was discovered that the DC flag was put upside down on the DC Voters Guide sent to residents in the district the previous day. It was originally reported by Denise Tolliver, the District of Columbia Board of Elections' spokesperson, that the inverted flag was placed as a way to draw attention to the upcoming election. The turnout at the previous election was at a historic low with only 27% turnout. Later that day, after checking with the printer, the Executive Director, Clifford Tatum, confirmed that it was indeed an error. According to him, a member of the design team had stylized the logo in past elections. He stated that "[The Board] ha[s] done different things with the flag in the past. Her idea was the bars would be above the stars." Since the error was found after they were published, it appears someone came up with the cover-up idea of it being intentional. Ward 5 Council Member Kenyan McDuffie stated "My impression is that this was not an intentional act, and it was an error. And if it was intentional, then it was ridiculous that anyone would sanction that." The board issued an apology and acknowledged both issues with the DC flag properly oriented as a watermark:

"Well, we messed up. BIG time. The cover of the Voter’s Guide recently mailed to you had an image of the District’s flag turned upside down. That is our fault, and we apologize for displaying the flag in that manner. If that weren’t enough, we also fumbled our handling of the issue, and we apologize to you for that as well."

— District of Columbia Board of Elections

=== Federal use ===
Until 2013, the DC flag was not automatically raised at events in the United States Armed Forces along the flags of the 50 states. The National Defense Authorization Act for Fiscal Year 2013 was signed into law by President Barack Obama in January 2013 contained a provision that required just that the DC flag and the flags of the territories be displayed whenever the flags of the states are displayed. This legislation was pushed by Delegate to the House of Representatives Eleanor Holmes Norton.

=== Private use ===
The Washington Capitals' logo evokes the flag's red stars and bars.

The design has been embraced by the public in the 20th century and it has become a symbol of the district. It is used in the logos of D.C. United, the DC Defenders, Old Glory DC, the Washington Capitals, and the Washington Wizards.

It has been used by many local brands in their logos to show their local connection. One such example is DC Brau Brewing whose logo includes the DC flag on the US Capitol. The Department of Small and Local Business Development established the Made in DC program "to capture, highlight and promote the intellectual and creative genius of DC’s local maker community". The logo includes the DC flag as part of its design.

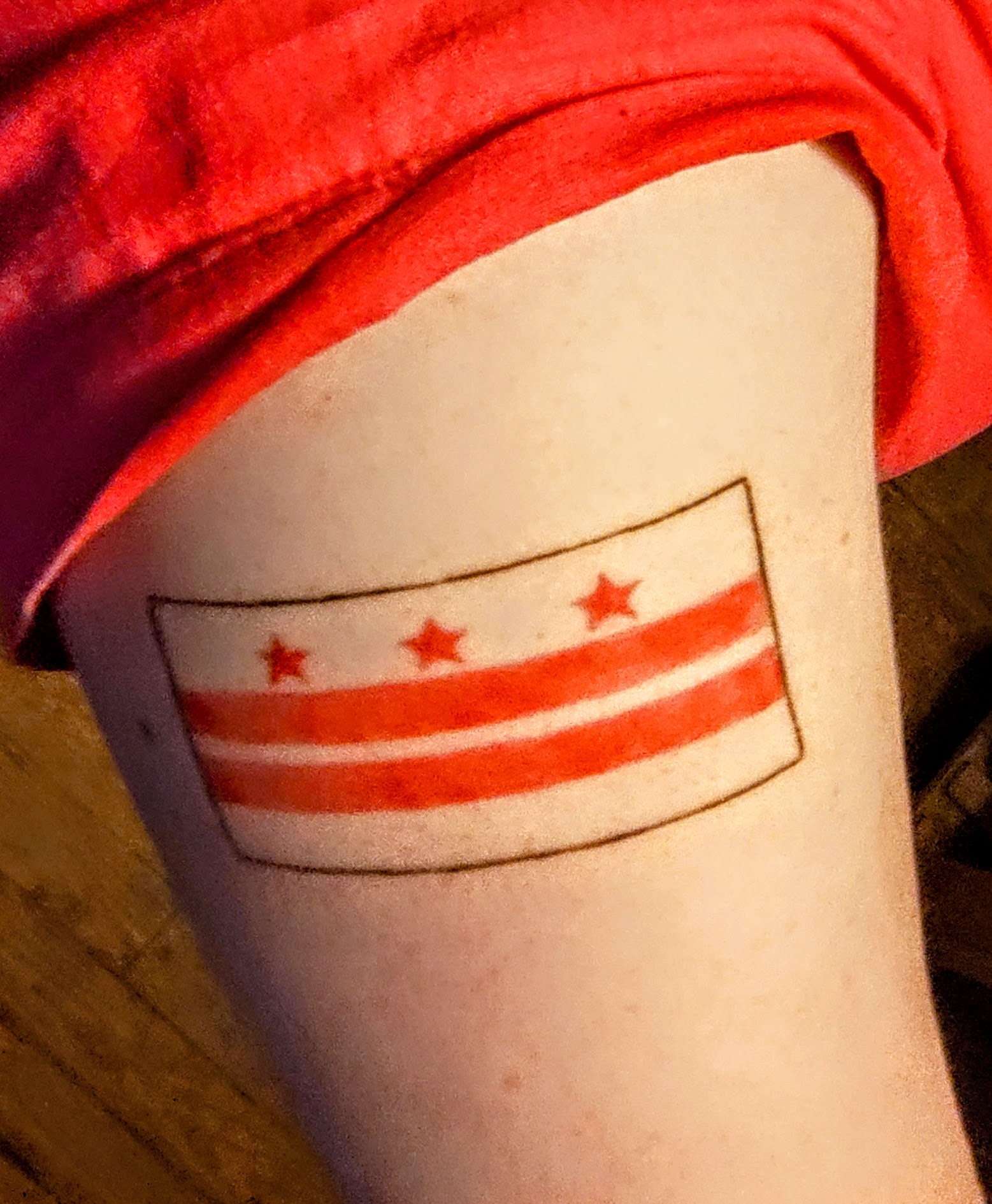
A tattoo of the flag on a Washingtonian's right shoulder

The flag is a popular tattoo design among residents of the district. Some years on Flag Day, people with D.C. flag tattoos have gathered in Dupont Circle to celebrate it rather than the U.S. flag, and to rally for D.C. voting rights. Notable bearers of the tattoo include Ward 3 Council Member Mary Cheh and radio host Kojo Nnamdi—who, along with Tom Sherwood, political analyst at the local National Public Radio WAMU agreed to get tattooed in for a $3,000 donation to the public supported station. It was announced on air on October 23, 2015 and the tattoos took place on November 20, 2015.

== Criticism of the design ==
The D.C. flag was not well received by many in the local population at the time of its adoption. The failure to involve the local population in the selection of their flag was met with controversy and many found new meanings for the stars and bars with many negative symbols and parallels.

With the District of Columbia Organic Act of 1801, the new federal district was placed under the sole authority of Congress. In the process, DC residents lost voting representation in Congress as they were no longer part of a US state. They also lost representation in the Electoral College and the right to home rule. By 1938, the residents were still fighting for these rights. The Twenty-third Amendment restored the right to vote in the Electoral College and on December 24, 1973, the District of Columbia Home Rule Act allowed the residents to elect a mayor and the 13-member Council of the District of Columbia.

In 1938 however, the situation was much different. The Evening Star points out that while the residents of the district had now a flag, they were still without a vote or representation. The refusal to involve local participation in spite of multiple requests of local civic associations was a clear sign that nothing had changed in terms of local representation and involvement in the federally controlled government. The lack of local significance or symbolism was also criticized and new interpretations of the flag were found. The two red stripes were seen as representing the Senate and House of Representatives where DC residents were not represented, while the three stars represented the three commissioners who ruled over the district with accountability to the people who were innocent and represented in white.

The chairman of the Flag Committee of the Society of Natives noted:

One critic finds fault with the absence of blue and of the predominance of red. This suggests that it is well this action of the Flag Commission did not occur in the stirring days of the "red rider." (Note: A reference to the "red rider" which forbade district schools from using federal funds "for the payment of salary of any person teaching or advocating Communism". It was voted by Congress on the June 14, 1935 appropriations for the District of Columbia (H.R. 3937 (74th Cong.)) and repealed in 1937.) Surely the hand of Moscow would have been suspected of animating the commission had this banner bearing so much red been born at that time.

— Jess C. Suter

One resident had similar views, describing his vision of the flag which he considers "a misfit for a flag to represent the seat of government of the greatest free country of the earth".

Leaving out the blue of heaven, there is sandwiched in between irregular strips of the white of purity, two crimson cross bars of Stalin-hued tyranny, or the scarlet-colored brand of universal shame. To make the redness redder, the spotless white of purity is further splotched with red stars. And it is a shame to flaunt redistic bars and "stars," behind which the citizens of the District are found fettered in political degradation like unto that of the desperate convict or the violently insane.

— Joseph W. Cheyney

Over time, attitudes toward the design changed, being embraced by many, including the statehood movement.

The flag of Washington D.C. placed eighth out of 72 entries in a 2001 survey of U.S. and Canadian subdivisional flags by the North American Vexillological Association.

== History of Washington family arms ==
The coat of arms in question is blazoned as:

Argent two bars gules, in chief three mullets of the second.

According to records available, this coat of arms was granted to Lawrence Washington of Sulgrave Manor in 1592 by Robert Cook, Clarenceux King of Arms. He was the last known recorded grantee of that specific design by the College of Arms.

Lawrence would have passed it down to his descendants upon his death as it was the tradition. Lawrence Washington had two sons: John (1589–1688) and Lawrence (1602–1652). Lawrence Washington was the youngest. As was often the case of younger children, he entered the clergy as he seems to not have had received the estate and became a rector.

Lawrence's oldest son, John Washington (1631-1677) was the earliest ancestor to arrive in America with his youngest brother. He settled in the Colony of Virginia in 1656. It is mentioned in Crozier's General Armory that John was using the coat of arms in Virginia in 1657. However this armorial was published 250 years later in 1904 and the author does not cite any sources for the coat of arms. It could well be that William Armstrong Crozier was deducting the fact that John had it because George Washington was using them a century and a half later.

There seems to have been no official recordings of this coat of arms in the colonies so it remains unclear who used the coat of arms between John Washington who settled in 1656 and the Revolutionary war. It is said that it was engraved on Elizabeth Washington (1717–1734/35), George Washington's cousin. It appears that the coat of arms had been used by the family in the Colony for some time as George Washington reported in his letter to Sir Isaac Heard on May 2, 1792. George himself had started using it as early as 1755, when he purchased goods with the coat of arms. It is well documented that George Washington, a British subject until the Revolutionary War, used this coat of arms extensively at Mount Vernon and on many objects.

While the United States were no longer under British rule after its independence, it appears that George Washington was actually studying his family heritage later in life both in terms of genealogy and heraldry as visible in his correspondence with the College of Arms represented by Isaac Heard from 1791 to 1796.

The earliest communication we have from his regarding this happens in 1788 with William Barton. The question was raised with regards to the design of the Great Seal of the United States and the possible need for regulations which George Washington was reluctant to the idea because of the fragility of the Union. At the time, he described himself as "imperfectly acquainted with the subject of heraldry. In his view "it might not [...] be advisable to stir any question, that would tend to reanimate the dying embers of faction, or blow the dormant spark of jealousy into an inextinguishable flame."

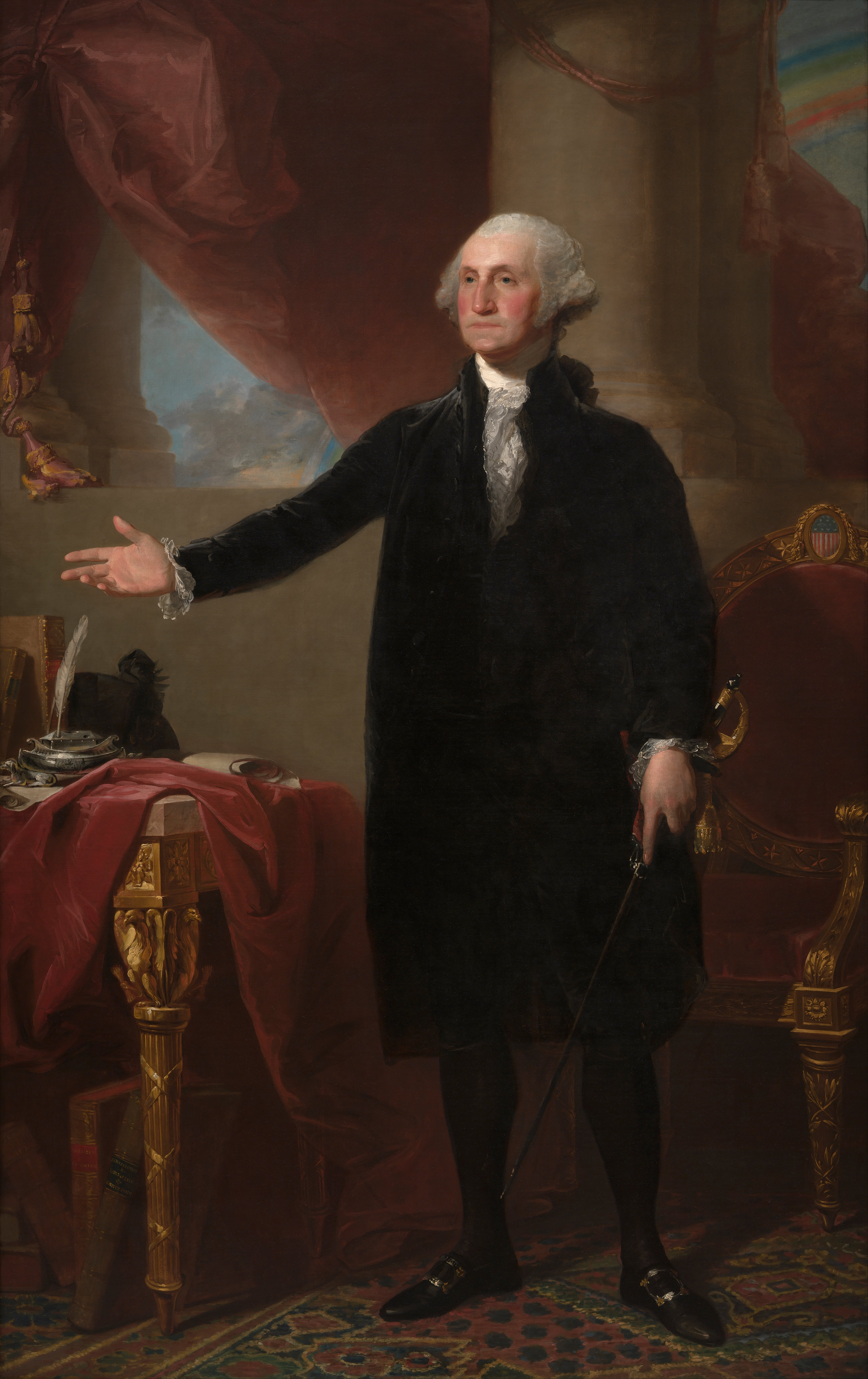
The Lansdowne Portrait by Gilbert Stuart, 1802, features an ink well with the coat of arms engraved on it.

A couple years later, the same President was in communication with Isaac Heard, who was the Garter Principal King of Arms to inquire about his family's coat of arms. The communication seems to be centered around the genealogical question. In the December 7, 1791 letter, Mr. Heard is requesting additional information regarding George Washington's ancestry as he seem to not have that information available. Mr. Washington responds on May 2, 1792 that he will probably not be able to provide this pedigree due to the lack of centralized records. He has been researching the historical family link to England and acknowledges that he is unsure about the exact location in England. It is in this letter that he mentions the resemblance of the arms:

The Arms enclosed in your letter are the same that are held by the family here—though I have also seen, and have used as you may perceive by the Seal to this Packet a flying Griffen for the Crest.

In an August 9, 1793, Mr. Heard informs Mr. Washington that he is still trying to prove that he is a direct descendant from Lawrence Washington who was granted the coat of arms and is requesting more information. The question appears to have not been resolved by July 10, 1796. He was still attempting to find the proof that the first immigrants (John and Lawrence) were in fact Lawrence Washington of Soul grove's descendants. No further letter is known to exist between the two, and George Washington died on December 14, 1799.

== See also ==
- George Washington
- Seal of the District of Columbia
- Flag of the United States
- Flag of Maryland
- Flag of Chicago
- Flag and seal of Virginia
- Vexillology
- Heraldry
