= List of breweries in Washington =

List of breweries in Washington may refer to:

- List of breweries in Washington (state)
- List of breweries in Washington, D.C.
