= George Juenemann =

German businessman (born 1823)

George Juenemann (1823–1884) co-owned and operated Humphrey and Juenemann's Pleasure Garden, a Washington DC brewery and early example of an American beer garden. The facility was also known as Juenemann's Brewery.

== Immigration to the United States and brewery operations ==
George Juenemann, with his wife Barbara, immigrated to the United States in 1851 and eventually settled in Washington, D.C. Juenemann opened Humphrey and Juenemann's Pleasure Garden, also known as Juenemann's Brewery, with Owen Humphreys in June 1857. The brewery and beer garden sat on 4th and 5th Streets Northeast between E and F Streets Northeast in Washington City.

George was born in 1823 in Bischhagen, Thuringia, Germany to Joannes Josef Juenemann from Heuthen, Thuringia, Germany and Catharina Staender from Dingelstaedt, Thuringia, Germany.

Juenemann purchased Humphreys share of the business five years later and renamed the facility Mount Vernon Lager Beer Brewery and Pleasure Garden. The brewery was the largest in the District of Columbia during the Civil War, but dropped to second largest by the 1870s when Christian Heurich Brewing Company claimed the title.
