= Abner-Drury Brewery =

Defunct American brewery

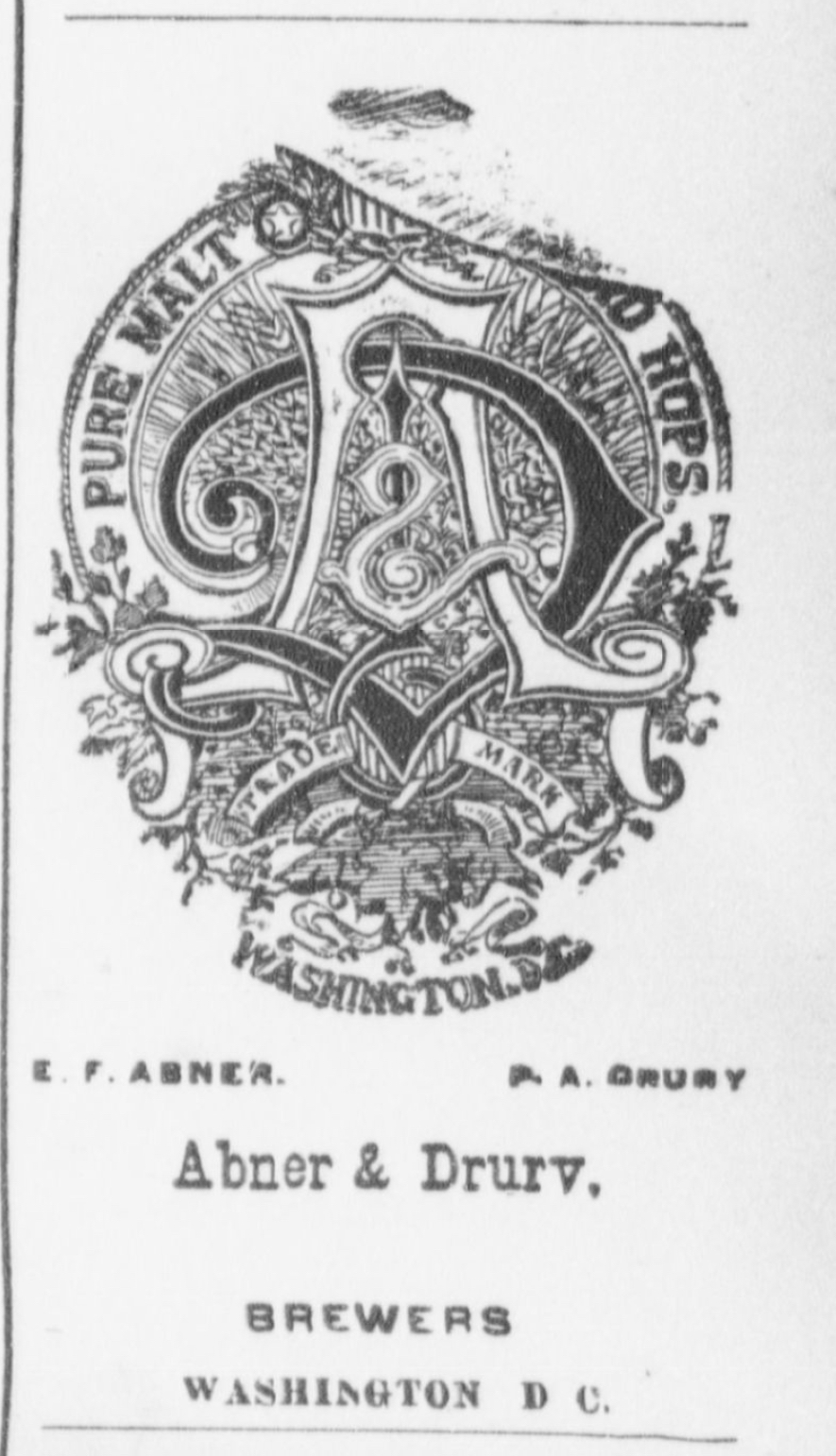
- Abner-Drury Brewery advertisement and logo 1900
- Formerly: Albert Brewery
- Industry: Alcoholic beverages
- Founded: 1898
- Fate: Defunct
- Headquarters: 25th and F Streets Northwest, Washington, D.C., United States
- Products: Beer
- Owner: Edward F. Abner; Peter A. Drury

The Abner-Drury Brewery, operating from 1898 to 1938, was a brewery in the Foggy Bottom neighborhood of Washington, D.C. The brewery went into bankruptcy on July 31, 1935, and subsequently reorganized as Washington Brewery, Inc. It went out of business permanently in August 1938.

== Early years ==
The business began when Edward F. Abner purchased the Albert Brewery in the late 1800s. In 1897, Peter A. Drury became E. F. Abner's partner. Abner, born 1864, was originally from Cologne and had moved to Washington in 1885; Drury, born 1865, was from Ireland.

Abner-Drury was located on 25th Street in a block extending from F to G Street NW, in Washington's Foggy Bottom neighborhood. It employed many of Foggy Bottom's German residents.

The name of the firm was initially "Abner and Drury, Brewers", and was changed to "Abner-Drury Brewery" in 1900. One of its signature products was the Old Glory beer. It made beer from only malt and hops.

In 1899, Abner and Drury's neighbor Christian Heurich (of the Christian Heurich Brewing Company) sued them for building their brewery several inches onto his property. Heurich claimed this incursion "greatly injured" his property, and he sought $25,000 in damages (equivalent to $944,900 in 2024). Heurich's lot was vacant.

In 1905, Abner-Drury, along with some other Washington-area brewers comprising the Brewers' Association, was involved in an antitrust suit under the Sherman Act. At the time, Abner-Drury was incorporated under West Virginia law. The case involved a conspiracy in restraint of trade across state borders.

== Prohibition era and after ==
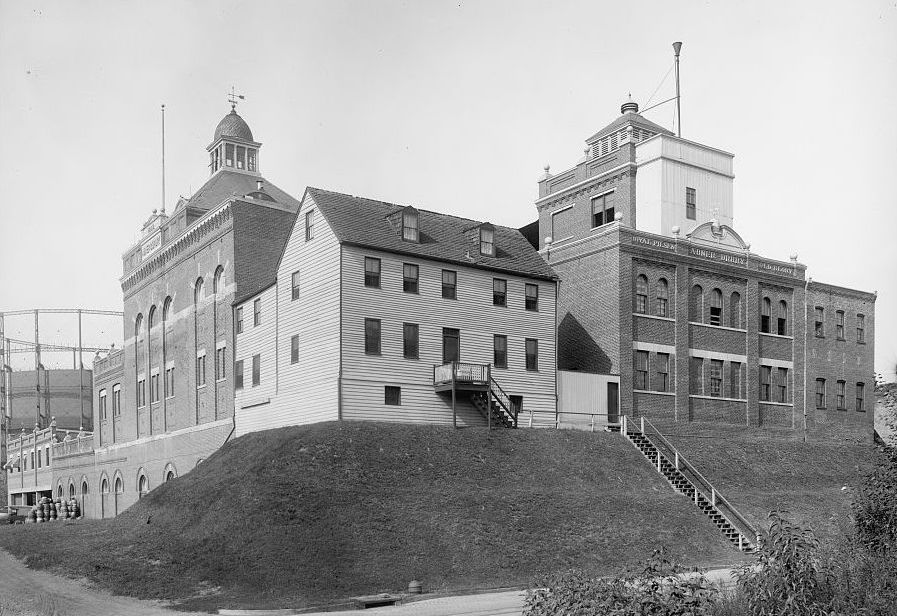
Abner-Drury Brewery, 1910.

Abner-Drury sold soft drinks from the start of Prohibition in 1918 until 1922.

In March 1933, after Franklin D. Roosevelt arranged for an amendment to the Volstead Act to permit near-beer, Abner-Drury sent a truck to the White House with the sign "President Roosevelt, the first beer is for you". Workers carried cases of beer into the White House, and a crowd spontaneously formed around the truck singing the 1929 song "Happy Days Are Here Again".

On April 7, 1933, in Milwaukee, Wisconsin, an Abner-Drury Brewery truck drove around the city with a U.S. Marine in the back. At each stop, the Marine handed out bottles of beer, and crowds gathered. The police had to step in to restore order.

Abner-Drury was one of two pre-Prohibition breweries to re-open in Washington (along with the Christian Heurich Brewing Company). With a campaign on NBC in May 1933, it was among the first to begin radio advertisements for beer after Prohibition ended. It marketed its near-beer with the slogan "The Beer with Everything BUT!"

Given the changing landscape of brewing after Prohibition and the rise of national bottled shipping brewers, the Abner-Drury Brewery had trouble competing. Bankrupt as of 1935, it was briefly revived as The Washington Brewery, Inc. from 1935 to 1938 when it went under permanently. Abner-Drury was sold to a single bidder at an auction in August 1938 to an agent of Charles Jacobsen, who ran the Arlington Bottling Company.

== See also ==
- List of breweries
- List of breweries in Washington, D.C.
- List of bottling companies
- List of defunct breweries in the United States
- List of defunct consumer brands

== Sources ==
- Slauson, Allan B (1903). A History of the City of Washington: Its Men and Institutions. Washington, D.C.: Washington Post Company. OCLC 1046523503.
