= Washington Brewery Company =

Former brewery in Washington, D.C.

Humphrey and Juenemann's Pleasure Garden Washington Brewery Company
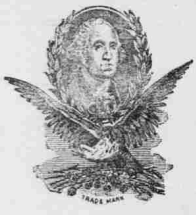
- Washington Brewery Company Logo

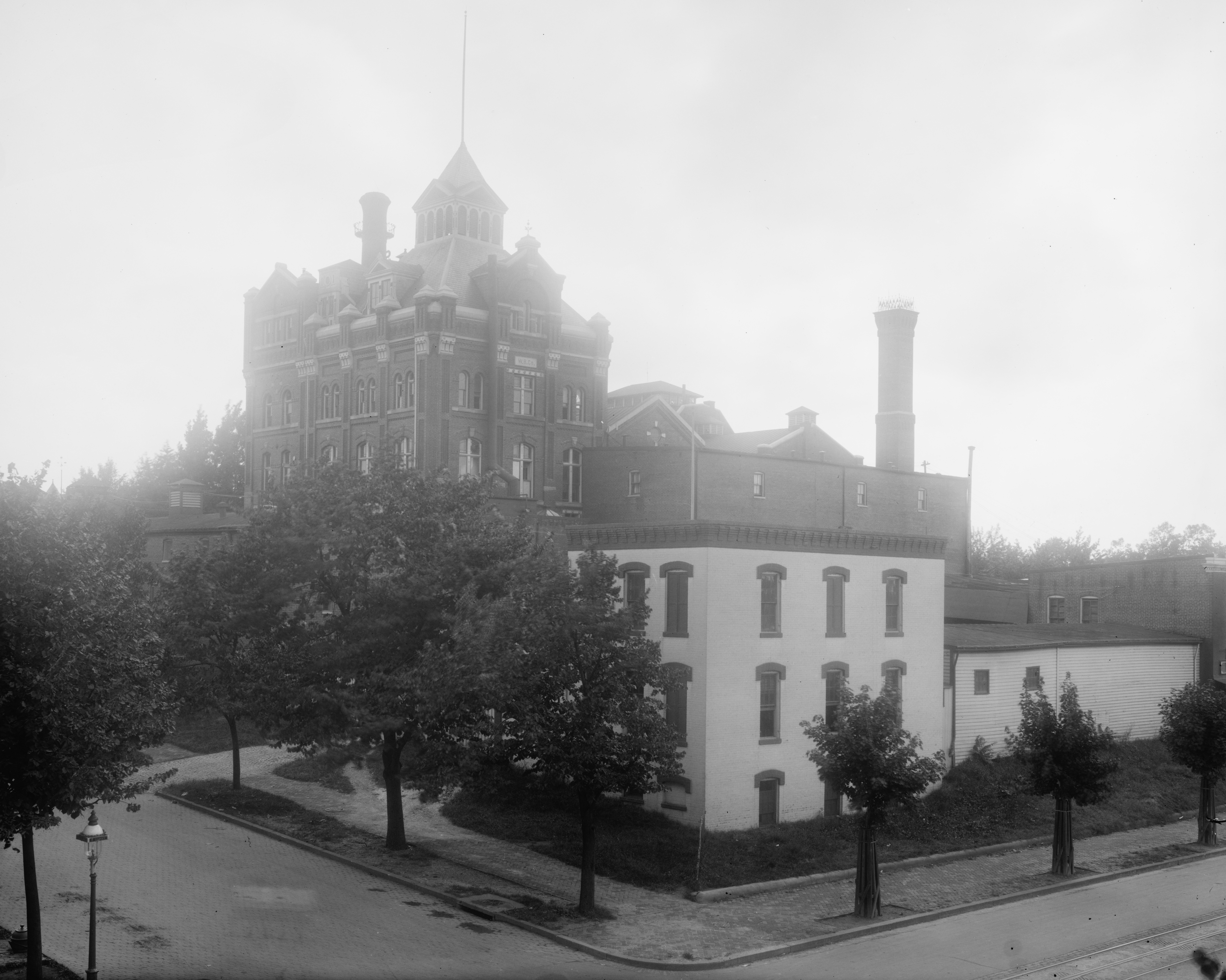
- The Washington Brewery Company around 1910 looking southwest toward the Capitol
- Interactive map of Humphrey and Juenemann's Pleasure Garden; Washington Brewery Company
- Location: Square 811 (4th, 5th, E and F Street NE), Washington, D.C., District of Columbia, United States
- Coordinates: 38.896817°N 77.000093°W
- Opened: 1857
- Closed: 1919
- Key people: George Juenemann; Albert Carry; Harry Williams
- Other products: Noalco (Temperance beer)

Inactive beers
| Name | Type |
| Golden Eagle (1887) |
| Champagne Lager |
| Capuciner |
| Ruby Lager (1895) | Dark Beer |
| Sparkling Ale |
| Bock Beer |
| Imperial Export |
| Golden Hop |

The Washington Brewery Company was a beer brewery in Washington, DC. It operated from 1890 to 1917 on Square 811 (bounded by 4th, 5th, E, and F Street NE).

== History ==
=== The first brewery ===
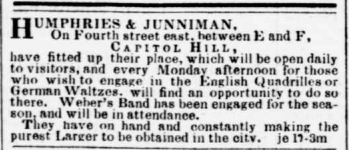
Humphries & Junniman Announcement in 1857

The first brewery was built in 1857 by George Juenemann in partnership with Owen Humphrey to support a German-style biergarten. It was known as Humphrey and Juenemann's Pleasure Garden when its opening was announced in the Evening Star on June 30, 1857. This was to be opened daily to visitors on Monday afternoons with balls where English Quadrilles and German Waltzes would take place. The place catered to the English American clientele and the recent German immigrants. Weber's Band provided the music, and Lager was available to purchase. It was believed to be the oldest brewery in Washington, DC.

In 1863 Juenemann bought out Humphrey's share of the business. It became Mount Vernon Lager Beer Brewery and Pleasure Garden or Juenemann's Brewery and was a local gathering place. Various events took place there, including picnics with dances (known as "Swampoodle Walks"), which could lead to both fights and frolics. It was later also known as Juenemann's Park.

=== Purchase by Albert Carry ===
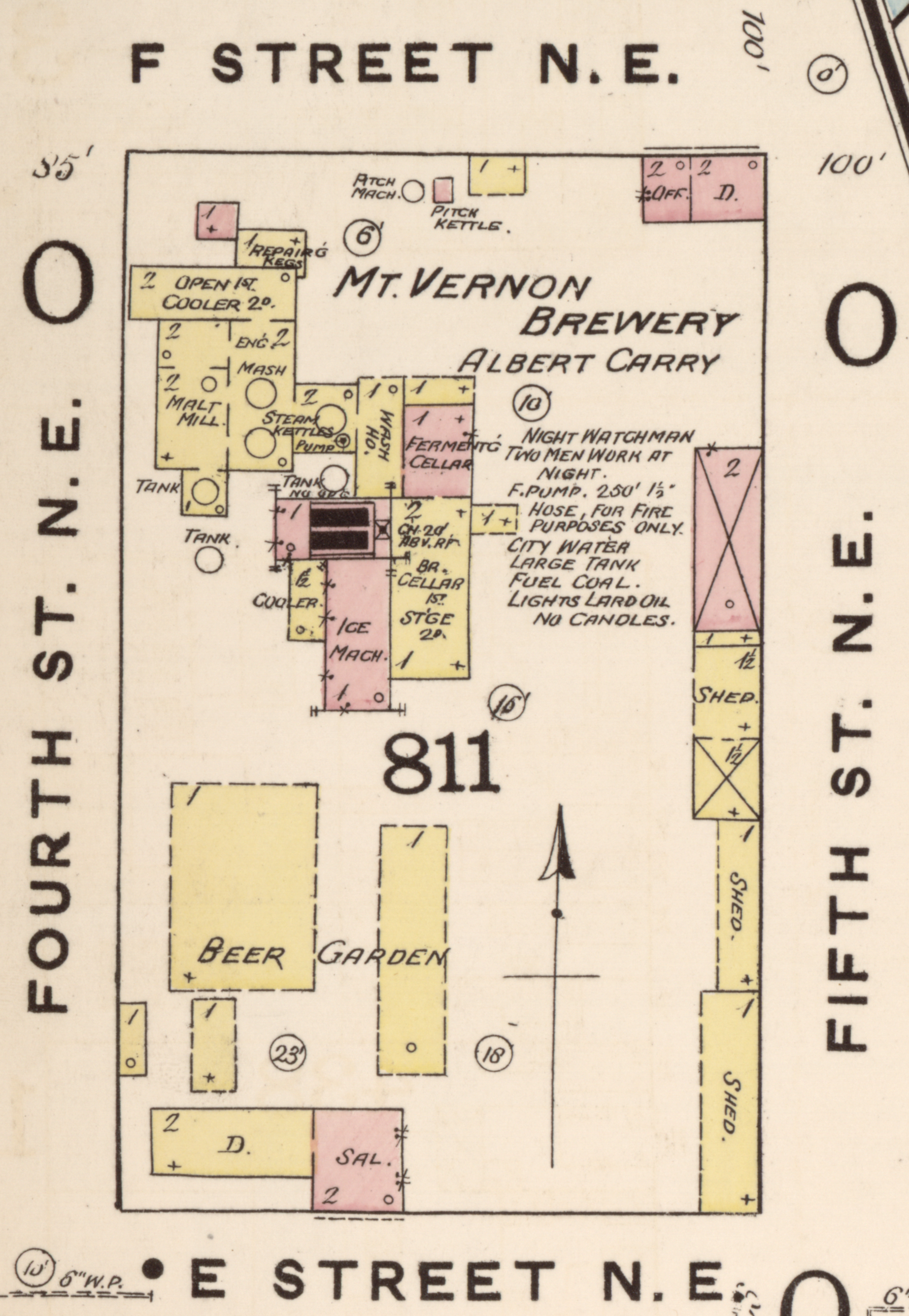
Layout of the Mount Vernon Brewery in 1888

Following George Jueneman's death in 1884, the property was purchased from widow Barbara, by Albert Carry of Cincinnati on October 14, 1886. The price was $95,000, a considerable amount for the time. He brought the brewery to a higher production level with modern equipment, including a large copper kettle in its center.

He operated this brewery initially with no apparent change to the name in 1887 and 1888. In 1889, Carry had some of his beer analyzed by Professor Fristoe of Columbian University, where the brewery is still listed as Mount Vernon Brewery though it appears it was also known as Carry's Brewery.

On February 10, 1888, the brewery was the victim of an unsuccessful burglary attempt early in the morning. The individuals were surprised as they woke up a resident, Joseph M. Frank, who opened fire with a revolver. They left with nothing, but a nearby business was robbed soon after that day, probably by the same burglars.

In 1889, Albert Carry attempted to sell his brewery but soon retracted his offer. According to an Equity Court filing from June 8, 1889, Joseph B. Hughes sued Albert Carry for refusing to carry out a contract between him and Mr. Carry. Mr. Carry said that Mr. Hughes only had an option and that he could not sell to an English Subject who could not acquire a title. On August 12, 1889, the New York Brewery Company purchased the brewery for $400,000. The brewery was sold to the Washington Brewery Company According to Albert Carry, all the purchasers were American. He retained two-thirds of the stocks and would carry on the business for the company, and two new buildings would be erected: one for brewing and another for storage. This allowed an increase in production from 50,000 barrels to 100,000 barrels.

=== English Corporation ===
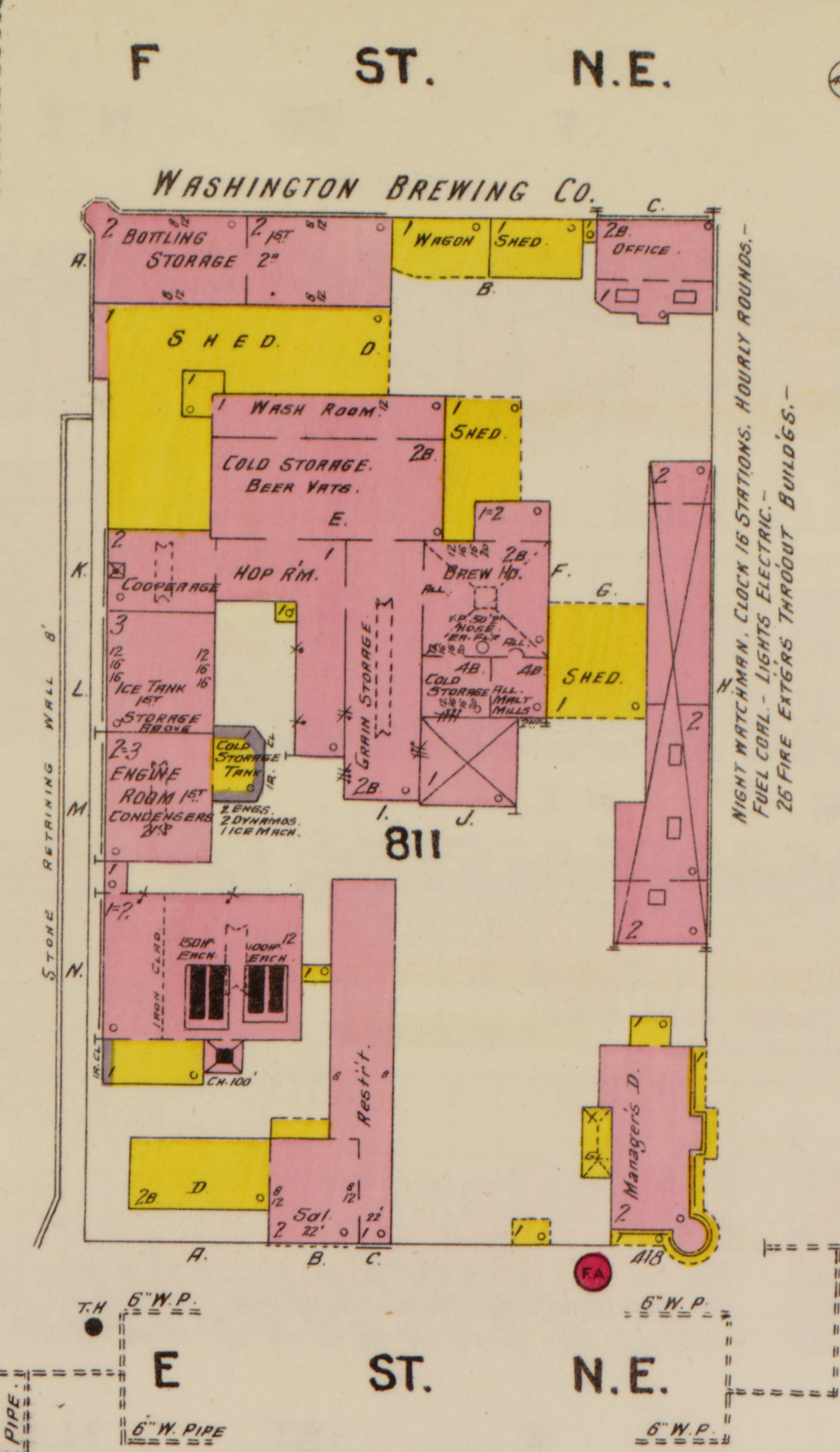
Washington Brewing Company in 1904

By September 3, 1889, the New York company was a front for an English Investment. Albert Carry defended himself by running an advertisement in The Evening Star starting September 12, 1889: "To my friends, patrons and the public in general: Notwithstanding the reports industriously circulated by some of my competitors, I have not sold my brewery to an English syndicate. The sale was made to a New York company in which I remain largely interested. I am ready at any moment to produce legal documentary evidence in support of this statement."

By November 1889, Albert Carry was ready to move on as he was purchasing land in southeast Washington, D.C., to build his next project: National Capital Brewing Company The property title was finally passed on to the British investors in 1892 for $400,000. The large enclosed garden — renamed The Alhambra in 1898 in reference to the Alhambra in Spain — was located next to the bar and offered tasty seafood to be consumed with the light and dark beers of the brewery. Concerts were also given to patrons.

In 1904, the English Corporation was restructured while keeping the same name. This led to eight stockholders' lawsuits in December 1906, which argued that the restructuring was not completed with their consent. They requested to become creditors of the new corporation.

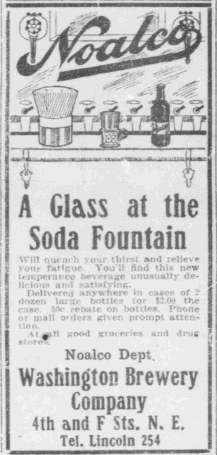
Nealco Ad in 1909

On April 23, 1909, the company launched a competition to name a new non-alcoholic drink for a prize of $100 in gold. The contest was announced on April 23 in an advertisement in the Evening Star by Harry Williams, General Manager of the brewery. The requirement was that the name be short, catchy, appropriate, and easily remembered. The closure of the submissions was set to May 3. On October 19, 1909, an advertisement in the Washington Times revealed the new name: Noalco. This product responded to the Temperance movement calling for non-alcoholic beverages. The drink was dispensed at soda fountains and was said to "quench your thirst and relieve your fatigue". It was also available in a case of 24 large bottles for delivery for $2, and in grocery and drug stores, individual bottles cost 5 cents and 10 cents. It was made of brewed malt and hops, yet was non-alcoholic. From November 8 to November 20, 1909, the National Food Show and Industrial Exposition opened in Convention Hall off of K Street NW. According to articles in the press, their samples were given out to visitors and very well received.

=== The end ===
Like many others, the Washington Brewery Company died with the Volstead Act of 1919, which established Prohibition in the United States. The lot was purchased on May 10, 1924, by Charles E. Myers through the Munsey Trust Company. Rumors were that Mr. Myers would set up an Apiary. The brewery was demolished in September 1924 to be replaced by a public school. Today, the Stuart-Hobson Middle School, located at 410 E Street NE, stands on the grounds previously occupied by the Washington Brewery Company.

== Beers and other beverages ==
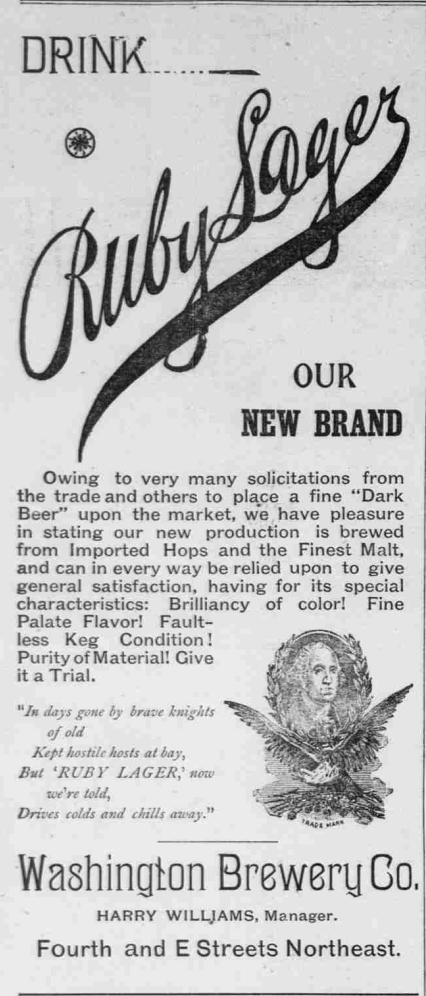
Ruby Lager Ad from 1895

=== Mount Vernon Brewery Beers ===
- Golden Eagle (1887)
- Champagne Lager
- Capuciner

=== Washington Brewery Beers ===
- Ruby Lager: a dark beer introduced in 1895
- Sparkling Ale: sold for 75 cents a case of 12 bottles.
- Bock Beer
- Imperial Export: sold for $1.25 a case of 24 bottles.
- Golden Hop

=== Washington Brewery Non-alcoholic beverages ===
- Noalco: brewed with malt and hops, this new beverage was introduced in 1909.

== See also ==
- National Capital Brewing Company
- George Juenemann
- List of defunct breweries in the United States
