= DC Brau Brewing =

Brewery in Washington, D.C.

- Type: Private
- Industry: Brewery
- Founded: 2009
- Headquarters: Washington, D.C., United States
- Website: www.dcbrau.com

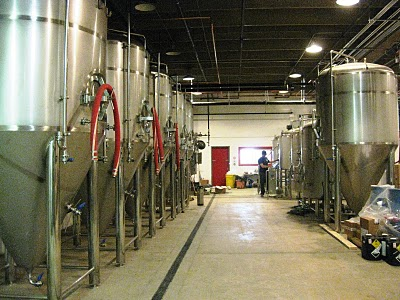

DC Brau Brewing is an American brewery based in Washington, D.C., founded in 2009. It is the first brewery to operate inside the District of Columbia since 1956, when the Heurich Brewery closed. The brewery was founded by Brandon Skall, its business manager, and Jeff Hancock, its brewmaster. Hancock has brewed at Grizzly Peak Brewing and Arbor Brewing Company, both in Ann Arbor, Michigan, and at Flying Dog Brewery in Frederick, Maryland.

DC Brau's inaugural beer was The Public, an American pale ale style beer. The brewery has also released an India Pale Ale style called The Corruption, a Belgian-style pale ale called The Citizen, and a pilsner called Brau Pils, as well as other limited releases.

All of the brewery's waste is delivered to a family-owned farm in Haymarket, Virginia, where it is converted into animal feed and composting material.

DC Brau also supported a bill before the Washington City Council that would allow on-site beer tasting at breweries within the city's limits. D.C. law previously only allowed on-site tastings at grocery stores and retailers that do not manufacture beer at the same location, prohibiting the brewery itself from opening a tasting room.

== See also ==
- List of breweries in Washington, D.C.
