= Metropolitan Lager Bier Brewery =

Metropolitan Lager Bier Brewery and Washington City Garden, opened by Ernst Loeffler in 1860, was a popular Washington, D.C. gathering place for Union Soldiers during the Civil War.

== Founder ==
Ernst Loeffler, a German immigrant to the United States, established Metropolitan Lager Bier Brewery and Washington City Garden in 1860. Loeffler brewed German-style lager that he both sold to local bars and served to patrons of Washington City Garden, a beer garden adjacent to the brewery. Thousands of Union patronized Loeffler's Washington City Garden during the Civil War.

Washington City Garden was an early example of a German-style beer garden in Washington, D.C.
