= National Capital Brewing Company =

Former brewery in Washington, D.C.

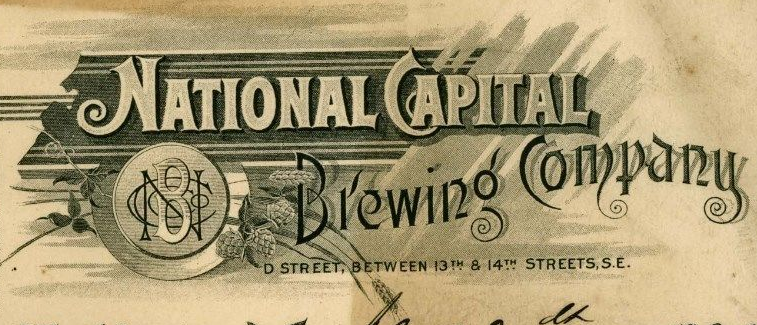
- National Capital Brewery Company letter head

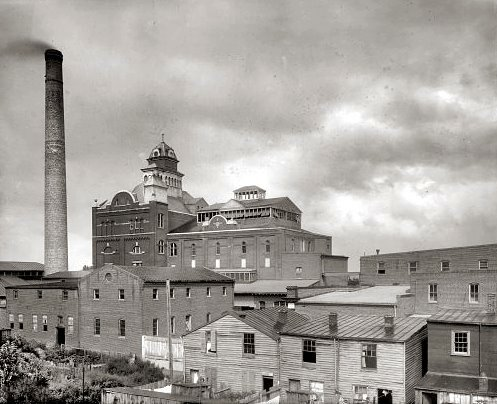
- National Capital Brewing Company Building
- Interactive map of National Capital Brewing Company
- Location: D Street SE between 13th Street SE and 14th Street SE; Washington, D.C. United States
- Coordinates: 38.883561°N 76.986534°W
- Opened: 1890
- Closed: 1917
- Key people: Albert Carry; Robert Portner
- Annual production volume: 100,000 barrels
- Other products: Carry's Ice Cream

Inactive beers
Name	Type
Golden Eagle	Lager
Münchner	Dark Lager
Diamond (1898)	Light Lager

The National Capital Brewing Company was founded in 1890 by Albert Carry and Robert Portner, two successful Washington, D.C., area brewers. The brewery could produce 100,000 barrels of beer a year and was considered state-of-the-art for the time. It replaced a previous brewery which operated on the site since at least 1877.

== History ==
=== Early Establishments ===
Several lots go on sale in square 1042 starting on December 19, 1804, but the area remains relatively undeveloped. The beginnings of the brewery on the site located at 14th Street between D and E Streets Southeast in Washington, D.C., remain unclear. The first documented brewery and garden on the site belonged to Francis J. Adt in 1875. On December 20, 1875, he receives a liquor licence from the board of Police Commissioners. He was the owner of the Navy yard Lager Beer Brewery and Summer Garden which he owned until 1882. On September 21, 1878, he hosts a fund-raising for the Yellow fever sufferers in the South.

In 1882, the property was bought by John Guethler and in 1884, he received building permit for a dancing pavilion on the premises. The same year in May, the Cannstatter Volksfest Verien takes place at the venue. The end of the Swabian Festival is celebrated there with an estimated 3,000 people in attendance on October 6, 1884. Games, dances, beer and plenty of Swabian traditional costumes make for a major event in the local population of German immigrants. The following year on May 11, 1885, Guethler's Park is officially opened in a grand celebration involving a 20 piece orchestra, shooting competitions, bowling competitions, illuminations and dancing. The Cannstatter Volksfest Verien returns on May 21, 1885, at the venue following the French Night Festival organized on May 18, 1885, by l'Union Fraternelle de Langue Française. On July 4, 1885, a concert is held at the Park with the 3rd Artillery Band playing followed with a military ball.

In 1886, Carl Eisenmenger and Henry Rabe bought the brewery. It was called the Eisenmenger & Rabe Brewery from 1886 to 1887 when the partnership was dissolved by mutual consent on June 2, 1887. It was renamed the Henry Rabe Brewery in 1888. After selling his Mount Vernon Lager Beer Brewery (which became the Washington Brewery Company) in 1889, successful brewer Albert Carry partnered with brewer Robert Portner to purchase the Washington Brewery in 1890. They renamed it the National Capital Brewing Company.

=== Grand Opening ===
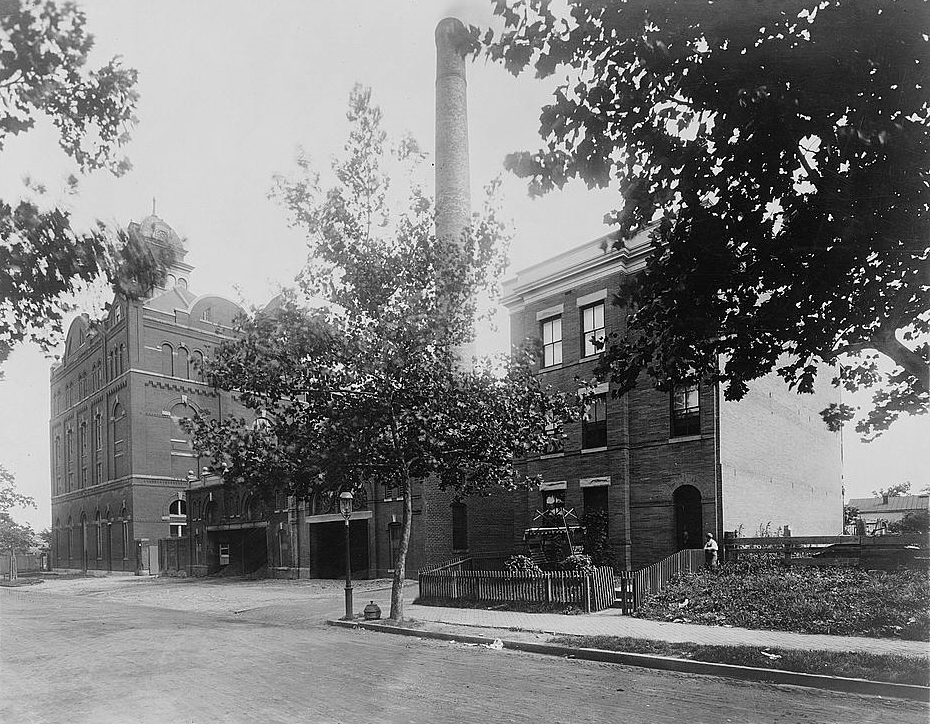
National Capital Brewing Company building

The brewery reopened on July 26, 1891, in a brand new building (finished in June 1891) located on the south side of D Street SE between 13th and 14th Street SE. Upon it opening a reception was held on July 28, 1891, from 3 pm to 8 pm during which visitors could visit every part of the building and see every part of the process. It operated in a five-story fire resistant building, and produced 100,000 barrels of beer per year from using water from its own well.

On July 26, 1891, a contract was signed between the F.H. Findley & Son Bottling Company (located at 1206 D Street) for 20,000 barrels of a special Pale Extra Beer as it was advertised in The Sunday Herald. If the quality failed, the Brewing Company would have to pay $20,000, if the other party failed to use that much beer, they would have to pay $10,000.

On February 27, 1897, The Brewery announced that it had purchased the chattels of the Gerhard Lang's Buffalo, N.Y., Park Brewery Agency including its bottles and other items previously owned by that brewery.

On February 1, 1913, the company purchased the Commercial Hotel located at 7th St and Pennsylvania Ave NW as an investment from Bessie L. Brown.

=== Murder ===
On September 17, 1912, the brewery was the scene of one of a murder that made headlines in the local newspapers. Arthur A. Webster was a Navy Yard mechanic who disappeared in the early hours of the day from his house at 1240 D Street SE. His disappearance was reported two days after his disappearance.

A few charred bones were pulled out of the combustion chamber of furnace No. 6 in the Brewery. On October 5, 1912, it was determined in a Coroner’s Jury that Lentie L. Jett, a fireman at the Brewery, had murdered Mr. Weber and cremated his remains before committing suicide on September 29, 1912, at his home at 627 Florence Street NE. Two bricks with what appeared to be congealed blood were found at the foot of the furnace. The police ordered that the furnace be racked. In the ashes, about half a bushel of human bones, a dime, penny, several buttons, a bottle opener and what appeared to be suspender buckles and a piece of melted metal which might have been a gold ring or knife or key were found. The bones were examined by physicians and declared to be human in nature. A piece of scapula was determined to belong to a man beyond a doubt. The District chemist confirmed that it was blood that was found on the brick. According to Detective Baur Mr. Webster “was supposed to last have been seen alive sitting on a box back of furnace No. 6.” Nails were also found in the combustion chamber.

It was revealed that Webster and Jett had quarreled in the past. A fireman by the name of Barrett testified that he had left the two men around 4 o’clock that morning by the furnace. Barrett had known Webster for several months as he was a frequent visitor of the Brewery at night as he was a close friend of another fireman there. It was also believed that alcohol was involved with Webster drinking as Jett possibly as well.

Both widows and family were present at the court hearing. The remains of Mr. Webster were buried the on October 7, 1912.

=== Prohibition ===
In 1917, Washington, D.C., passed as early local Prohibition ordinance, and the National Capital Brewing Company transitioned in May 1917 to producing ice cream instead of beer, as the facility had an ice plant. Carry's Ice Cream was produced for only one year, after which Albert Carry sold it. The facility became the Meadowgold Dairy, and operated under this name until the 1960s. It was demolished in 1965.

== Beers ==
The two original beers:

Make	Gravity	Carbonic Acid (per ct.)	Alcohol (per ct.)	Extract (per ct.)	Gumand Dextrin (per ct.)	Lactic Acid (per ct.)	Acetic Acid (per ct.)	Ash. (per ct.)
Golden Eagle (lager)	1.015	0.216	3.86	5.96	3.46	0.086	0.058	0.168
Münchner (dark lager)	1.018	0.221	4.52	5.65	4.21	0.108	0.078	0.221

A new light lager was introduced in 1898, called Diamond.

== Packaging and Delivery ==
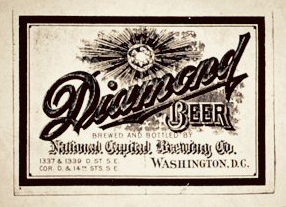
Diamond Beer Label

Originally, most of its beer was consumed in saloons and the brewery did not bottle its own beer, using third-party bottlers instead. However, on February 24, 1897, the Brewery filed a description of its bottles, name and marks with the clerk of the Supreme Court of the District of Columbia in compliance with sections 1188 and 1189 of the revised statues of the District of Columbia.

Two bottles were described:

- Green glass bottle: Blown on the side National Capital Brewing Co., Washington, D.C., with the United States Capitol building inside the inscription with Trade Mark above and below the said building.
- Amber glass bottle: Blown on the side National Capital Brewing Co., Washington, D.C., with the United States Capitol building inside the inscription with Trade Mark above and below the said building.

Of course, both bottles were exclusively to be used for the packaging of the beers made by the National Capital Brewing Company and no other entity was allowed to use these.

To deliver its beer, National Capital initially used horse-drawn wagons. In 1903 it bought an electric truck for this purpose, the first Washington-based brewer to do so.

== Legacy ==
Today, nothing remains of the brewery itself. A Safeway Grocery Store stands in its place.

In 2015, Michael Webb and Wes McCann announced plans to open a new National Capital Brewing Company in Washington, D.C. Brands produced by the brewery will pay homage to the original brands of National Capital Brewing Company.

== See also ==
- List of defunct breweries in the United States

== Sources ==
- Peck, Garrett (2014). Capital Beer: A Heady History of Brewing in Washington, D.C. Charleston, SC: American Palate. ISBN 978-1-62619-441-0.
