= Gotha =

- Town
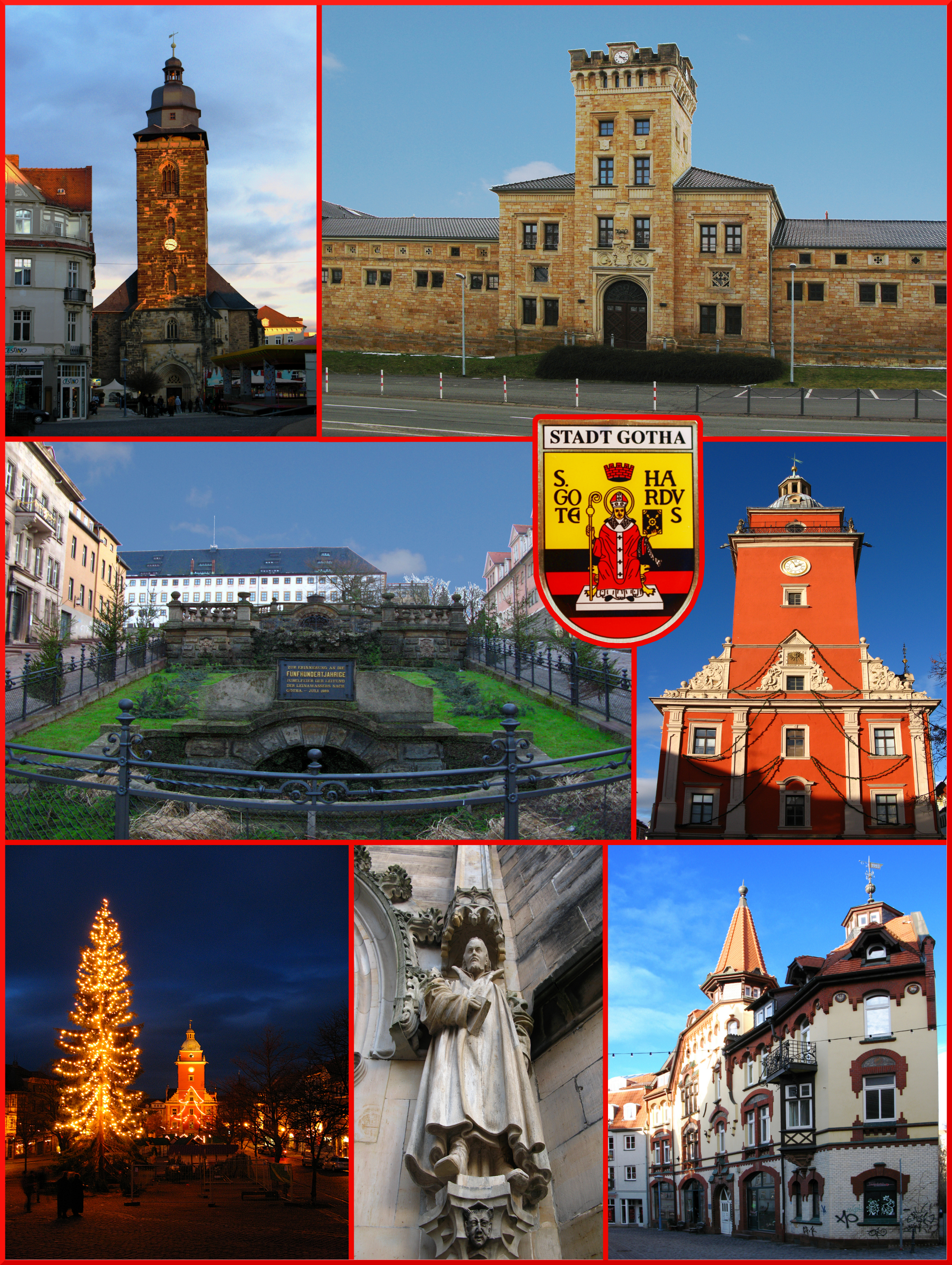
- Top left: St Margarethen, Top right: Marstall, Middle left: Water feature in front of Friedenstein Castle, Middle right: Rathaus Gotha in Hauptmarkt, Bottom left: View of Christmas illumination event in Hauptmarkt, Bottom centre: Porch in St Margarethen Church, Bottom right: Bruhl Street

- Coat of arms

- Location of Gotha within Gotha district
- Interactive map of Gotha
- Location within Germany Location within Thuringia
- Coordinates: 50°56′58″N 10°42′5″E
- Country: Germany
- State: Thuringia
- District: Gotha
- Subdivisions: 11

Government
  - Mayor (2024–30): Knut Kreuch (SPD)

Area
  - Total: 69.58 km^{2} (26.86 sq mi)
- Elevation: 300 m (980 ft)

Population (2025-12-31)
  - Total: 46,400
  - Density: 667/km^{2} (1,730/sq mi)
- Time zone: UTC+01:00 (CET)
  - Summer (DST): UTC+02:00 (CEST)
- Postal codes: 99867
- Dialling codes: 03621
- Vehicle registration: GTH
- Website: www.gotha.de

Gotha (German pronunciation: [ˈɡoːtaː]) is the fifth-largest city in Thuringia, Germany, 20 kilometres (12 miles) west of Erfurt and 25 km (16 miles) east of Eisenach with a population of 46,400 (2024). The city is the capital of the district of Gotha and was also a residence of the Ernestine Wettins from 1640 until the end of monarchy in Germany in 1918. The House of Saxe-Coburg and Gotha originating here spawned many European rulers, including the royal houses of the United Kingdom, Belgium, Portugal (until 1910) and Bulgaria (until 1946).

In the Middle Ages, Gotha was a rich trading town on the trade route Via Regia and between 1650 and 1850, Gotha saw a cultural heyday as a centre of sciences and arts, fostered by the dukes of Saxe-Gotha. The first duke, Ernest the Pious, was famous for his wise rule. In the 18th century, the Almanach de Gotha was first published in the city. The publisher Justus Perthes and the encyclopedist Joseph Meyer made Gotha a leading centre of German publishing around 1800. In the early 19th century, Gotha was a birthplace of the German insurance business. The SPD was founded in Gotha in 1875 by merging two predecessors. In that period Gotha became an industrial centre, with companies such as the Gothaer Waggonfabrik, a producer of trams and later aeroplanes.

The main sights of Gotha are the early modern Friedenstein Castle, one of the largest Renaissance Baroque castles in Germany, the medieval city centre and the Gründerzeit buildings of the 19th-century commercial boom.

Gotha lies in the southern part of the Thuringian Basin in a flat and agricultural landscape.

== History ==
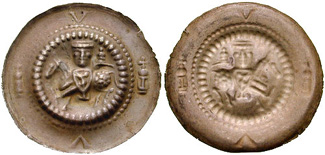
A Gotha coin from the 13th century

=== Middle Ages ===
Gotha has existed at least since the 8th century, when it was mentioned in a document signed by Charlemagne as Villa Gotaha (Old High German gotaha meaning "good waters") in 775. The first settlement was probably located around today's Hersdorfplatz outside the north-eastern edge of the later city centre. During the 11th century, the nearby Ludowingians received the village and established the city in the late 12th century, as Gotha became their second most important city after Eisenach. The city generated wealth because it was conveniently located at the junction of two important long-distance trade routes: the Via Regia from Mainz and Frankfurt to Leipzig and Breslau and a north–south route from Mühlhausen over the Thuringian Forest to Franconia. One of the oldest pieces of evidence of busy trade in the city is the "Gotha cache of coins" with nearly 800 Bracteates, buried in 1185 in the central city. In 1180, Gotha was first mentioned as a city, when the area between Brühl and Jüdenstraße became the core of urban development, highlighting the early presence of Jews in this old trading town.

The parish church of this first urban settlement was St. Mary's Church (demolished in 1530) at Schlossberg. The castle (at the site occupied today by Friedenstein Castle) was first mentioned in 1217. As the Ludowingians died out in 1247, Gotha became part of the Wettins' territories, where it remained until 1918. The new town east of Querstraße was established in the early 15th century (with the Neumarkt, first mentioned in 1428).

The monastery (first Cistercians, since 1258 Augustinians) was founded before 1251 and abandoned in 1525. Until 1665, the bourse of Gotha was located in the centre of Hauptmarkt square inside the Renaissance building, which hosts the town hall today. The medieval town hall was located on the north-eastern edge of Hauptmarkt, at the site of today's Innungshalle.

Water supply was a big problem, because Gotha is not located on a river. In 1369, Landgrave Balthasar had the Leinakanal built. This channel, over 25 kilometres long, brought fresh water from the Thuringian Forest (Hörsel and Apfelstädt rivers) to the city. The main businesses of medieval Gotha were cloth-making and the woad trade.

=== Early modern period ===
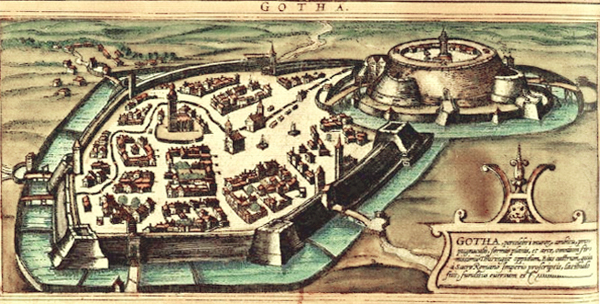
Gotha in 1572

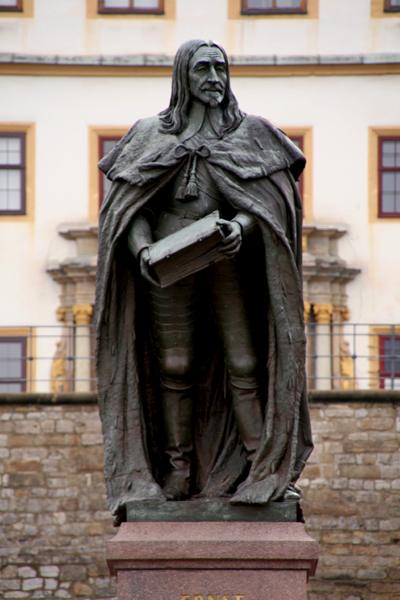
Memorial to Ernest the Pious in front of Friedenstein Castle

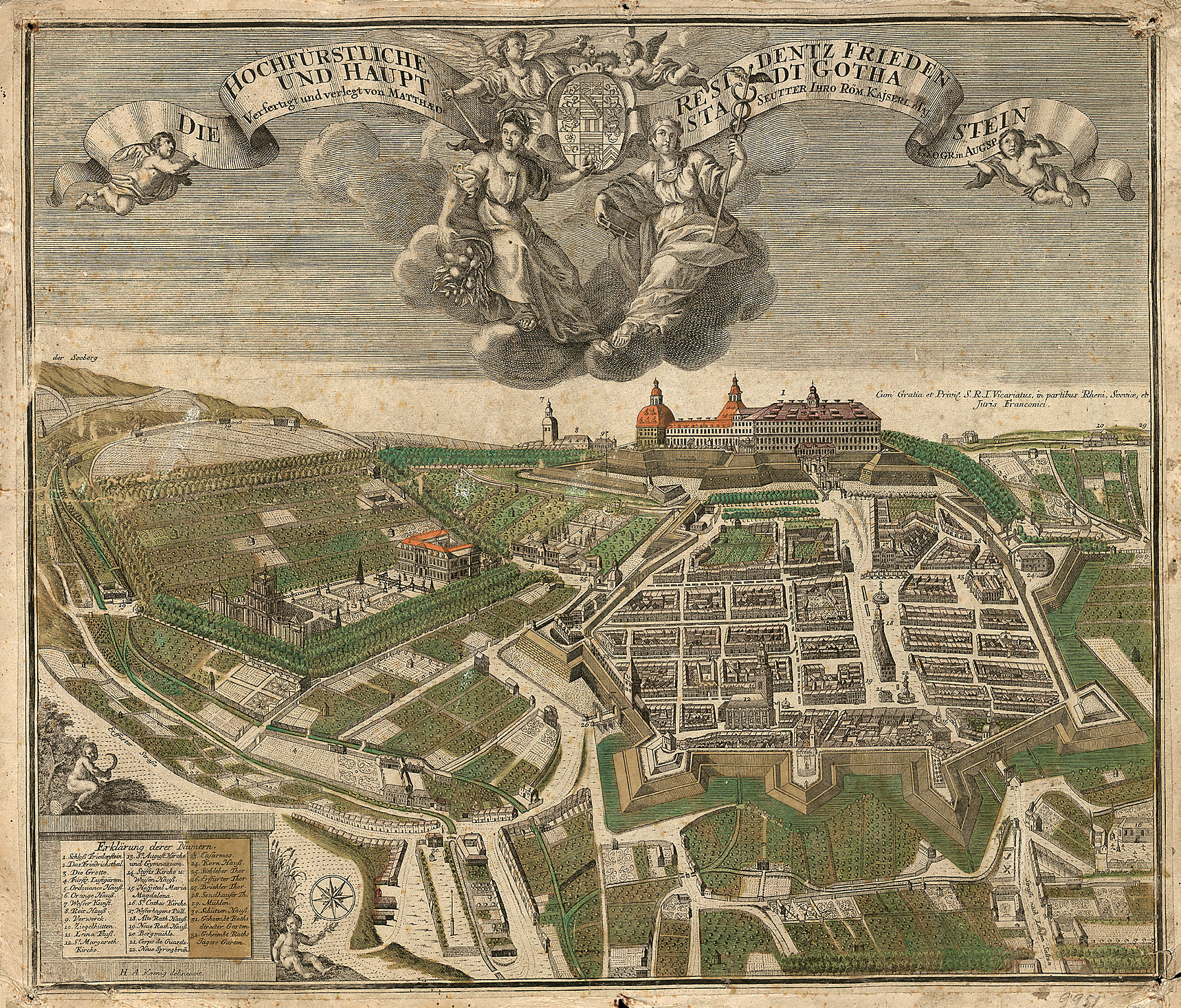
Gotha and the new Friedenstein Castle in 1730

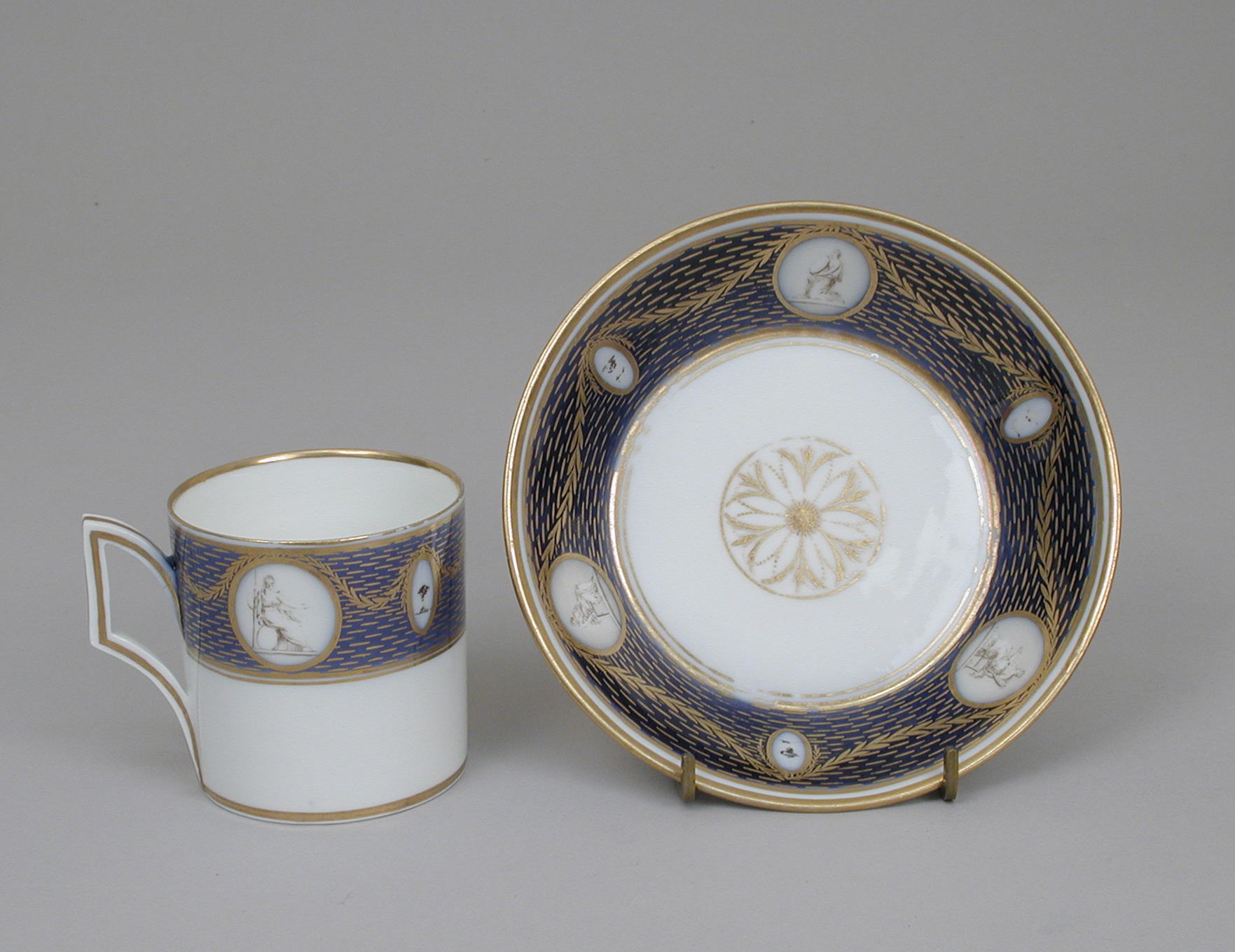
Neoclassical cup with saucer from Gotha, late 18th century, hard-paste porcelain

The Reformation was introduced in Gotha in 1524 and the castle was rebuilt as a larger fortress between 1530 and 1541. Gotha was already part of the Ernestine Wettins territory after the 1485 Treaty of Leipzig. However, the Ernestines' loss of power after the Schmalkaldic War in 1547, the Treaty of Erfurt in 1572, when the city became part of Saxe-Coburg, and the Thirty Years' War resulted in Gotha's decline. The local castle, Grimmenstein, was razed by Imperial troops in 1572.

The turnaround was brought about by the selection of Gotha as a ducal residence in the 1640 territorial partition, when Ernest the Pious founded the duchy of Saxe-Gotha. The strongly Protestant and absolutist sovereign quickly began to reorganize his small state (even before the war had ended) and in particular fostered the school system by introducing compulsory education up to the age of 12 in 1642. This was the origin of the often noted liberal education of the Gotha citizenry and the following cultural heyday.

Veit Ludwig von Seckendorff was one of numerous experienced and loyal civil servants employed by the duke. Seckendorff was considered one of the most able and influential thinkers on administration and public law of his time. His book Der teutsche Fürstenstaat (1656), written by order of Ernest, served for decades as a standard work in teaching political science at Protestant universities in Germany.

Friedenstein Castle was built between 1643 and 1654 and is one of the first large Baroque residence castles in Germany. Between 1657 and 1676, the city received a stronger fortification, which was demolished between 1772 and 1811. In their place, a park around Friedenstein and a boulevard around the city were established. Some important scientific institutions were the ducal library (today's Forschungsbibliothek Gotha as part of the University of Erfurt), founded in 1650, the "coin cabinet" (1712), the "art and natural collection", basis of today's museums, and the Gotha Observatory at Seeberg mountain, established 1788. The Gotha porcelain manufactory (established in 1767) was famous around 1800 for their faiences.

In 1774, the actor group led by Conrad (or Konrad) Ekhof, called "the father of German acting", came from Weimar to Gotha. He began working at the Schlosstheater and became Direktor of the first ever German court theatre (founded in 1683), while acting in many plays himself. Having turned it into one of the leading theatres in Germany, after his death in 1778 the fame of the theatre declined rapidly.

The Almanach de Gotha, a directory of European royalty and nobility, was first published in 1763 and Justus Perthes founded his science publishing company in 1785. Joseph Meyer followed in 1826 by founding the Bibliographisches Institut, one of the two leading encyclopedia publishers in the German language besides the Brockhaus and Adolf Stieler first published his Handatlas in Gotha in 1816. Johann Adam Weishaupt, the founder of the order of the Illuminati, died in Gotha in 1830. It was also during this time, that the city developed a sizeable Jewish population.

=== Since 1815 ===
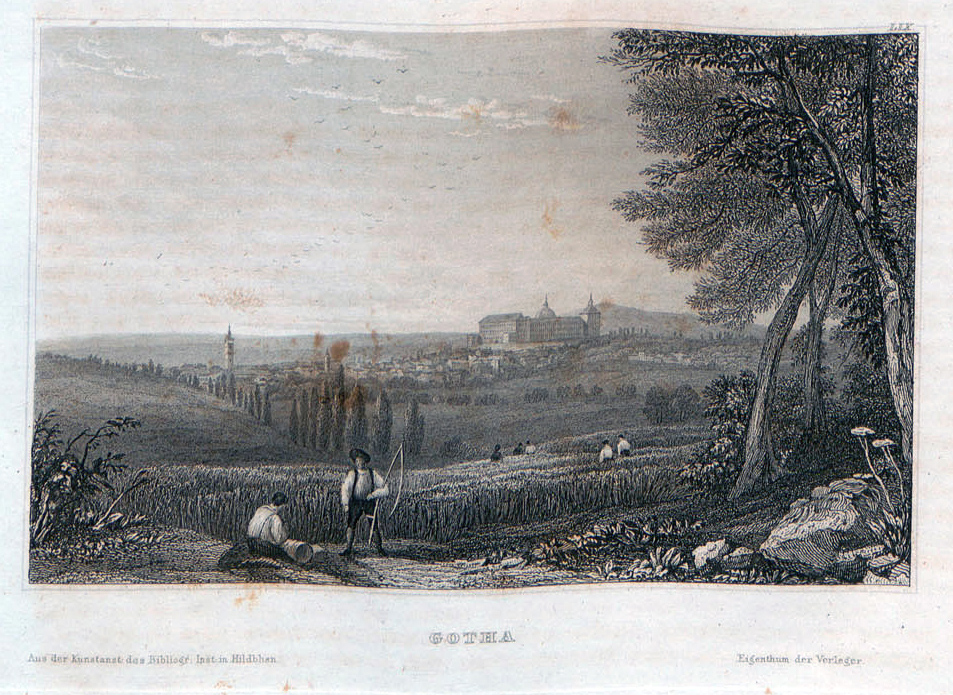
Gotha in Meyer's Universum, 1835

From 1826 to 1918, Gotha, along with Coburg, was one of the two capitals of the Duchy of Saxe-Coburg-Gotha. Under the rule of Duke Ernest II, Gotha was a centre of Germany's liberal movement, where the Gothaer Nachparlament took place in the aftermath of 1848 German Revolution. After 1851, Gustav Freytag, novelist, advocate of German unity, and, often harsh critic of Otto von Bismarck, made Siebleben (today part of Gotha) his summer home. Ernest II made Freytag Hofrat (privy councillor) in 1854, when the Prussian government had issued a warrant for his arrest.

In 1875, the German social democratic party SPD was founded in Gotha through the merger of two organizations: the Social Democratic Workers' Party, led by August Bebel and Wilhelm Liebknecht, and the General German Workers' Association, founded by Ferdinand Lassalle. A compromise known as the Gotha Program was forged, although it was strongly criticized by Karl Marx for its reformist bias in his Critique of the Gotha Program.

From 1876 to 1908, the novelist Kurd Lasswitz, sometimes referred to as "the father of German science fiction" worked as a teacher at Gotha's Ernestinum, the oldest Gymnasium in Thuringia.

Industrialization started in Gotha around 1850, as the city was connected to the Thuringian Railway in 1847. The city became a centre of engineering with companies like the Gothaer Waggonfabrik, a tram and aeroplane manufacturer, founded in 1883. During the 19th century, Gotha also became a centre of banking and the insurance business in Germany. Ernst-Wilhelm Arnoldi founded the first fire insurance in 1820, followed by the first life insurance in 1827. The Gothaer mutual insurance remains one of the largest insurance companies in Germany (it moved to Cologne after World War II). Gotha's tram network was established in 1894. The first crematory in Germany was built in Gotha in 1878.

The Independent Social Democratic Party of Germany (USPD), a left-wing breakaway of the SPD, was founded in Gotha in 1917 in opposition to the SPD's support of Germany's role in World War I. In November 1918, during the post-war German revolution, Duke Charles Edward abdicated under pressure from local workers' and soldier's councils. The USPD-dominated government elected in 1919 shepherded the Gotha region through its separation from Coburg and to the founding of the Free State of Saxe-Gotha under a parliamentary-democratic constitution. The far-left orientation of the workers' movement in Gotha nevertheless led the government of the young Weimar Republic to send troops into the city twice, once in February 1919 to protect the National Assembly meeting in Weimar, and a second time during the March 1920 right-wing Kapp-Lüttwitz Putsch in Berlin. On the latter occasion, 127 people lost their lives in Gotha. The Free State of Saxe-Gotha joined the State of Thuringia when it was formed on 1 May 1920.

Under Nazi rule, Gotha became a centre of the arms industry with nearly 7,000 forced labourers working in the city's factories, where more than 200 died. The Gotha barracks in the southern periphery were enlarged and during the Kristallnacht in October 1938 the synagogue was destroyed. Allied air raids in 1944/5 damaged some buildings in the city, in particular the state theatre (demolished by East German authorities in 1958), the main station (remained only "half-a-building"), and the main church (rebuilt after the war). Nevertheless, some 95% of the city's buildings survived the war unscathed.

Joseph Ritter von Gadolla was the city commander of Gotha. On 3 April 1945, the 4th Armoured Division of the 3rd US Army was stationed at Krahnberg and near Goldbach, ready to attack Gotha. Gadolla had white flags hoisted in Gotha and went to meet the Americans as a parliamentarian. He was captured, imprisoned in Weimar and shot by a firing squad. By then, Gotha was already free. Gadolla's last message is said to have been: 'For Gotha to live, I must die.' While the Americans had already taken half of Thuringia, Thuringia's Gauleiter Fritz Sauckel continued to order: 'Anyone who raises the white flag before the enemy will be treated as a traitor and a deserter.' Jewish slave laborers working in quarries at Gotha were all murdered by their Nazi overseers on 4 April 1945, just before the city was captured by American forces.

The American Army reached Gotha in April 1945 but was replaced by the Soviets in July 1945.

== Geography and demographics ==
=== Topography ===
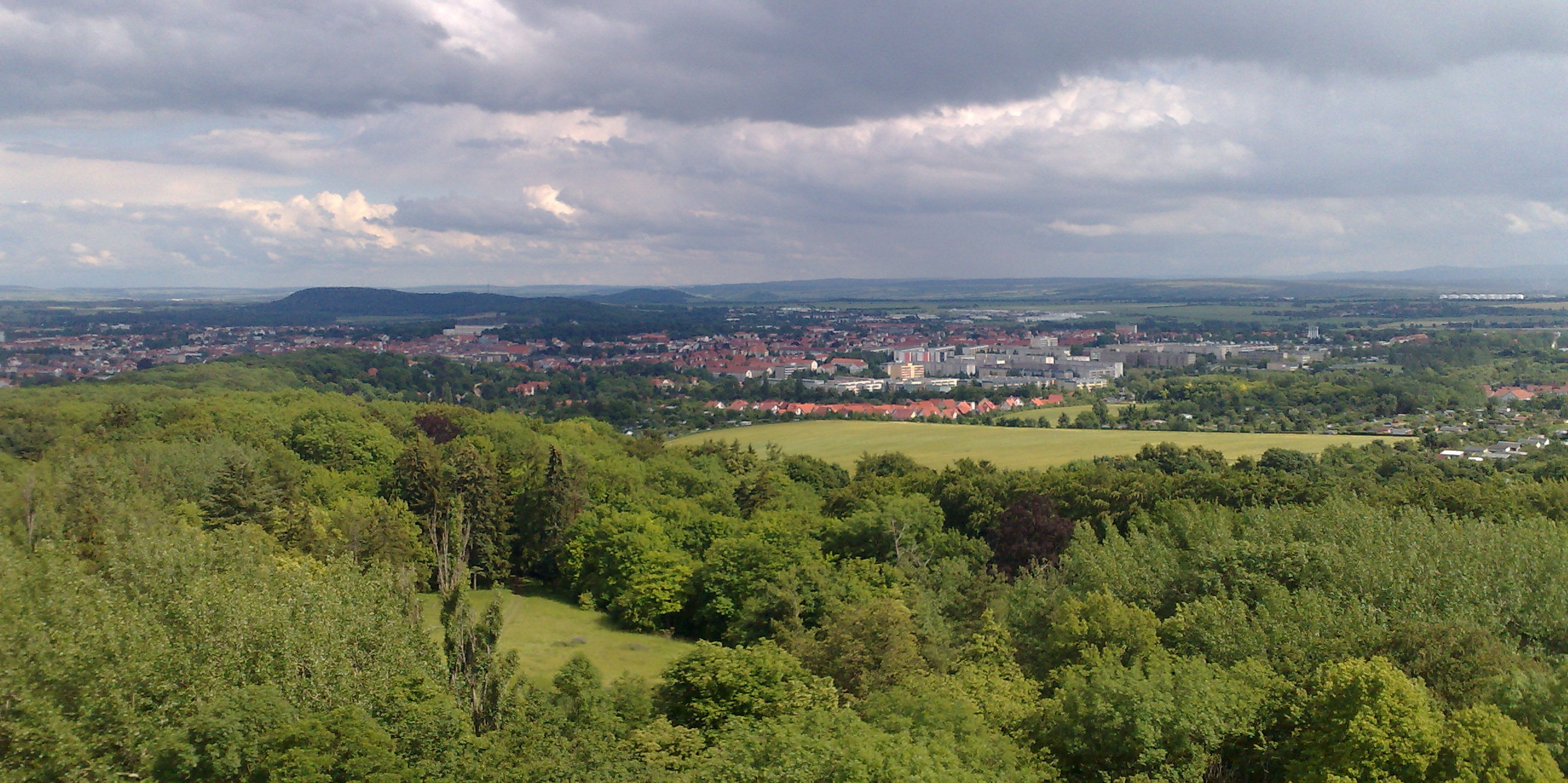
View from Krahnberg mountain over the city

Gotha is situated in a flat landscape within the fertile Thuringian Basin. A tectonic dislocation traverses the city from north-west to south-east. Thereby, it forms three prominent hills: the 431 m high Krahnberg with the Ratsholz forest in the north-west, the hill of Friedenstein Castle in the city centre and the 409 m high Seeberg in the south-east. The city itself lies at an elevation of 300 m and the municipal territory is nearly free of forest (with the two named mountains as exceptions) and is in intensive agricultural use. As one out of only very few ancient cities in Germany, Gotha is not situated on a river, so that water supply was already a problem in the Middle Ages. For that reason, the Leinakanal was built in the 14th century over a distance of more than 25 kilometres, which was at the time an enormous task. The Leinakanal brings water from Hörsel and Apfelstädt river to Gotha, overcoming the watershed between Elbe (Apfelstädt) and Weser (Gotha). The drain of Leinakanal is the Flutgraben, a tributary of Nesse. The Thuringian Forest is located 15 km (9 mi) south-west of Gotha.

=== Administrative division ===
Gotha borders the following municipalities, which are all part of Gotha district: Goldbach, Remstädt, Bufleben, Friemar, Tüttleben, Drei Gleichen, Günthersleben-Wechmar, Schwabhausen, Emleben, Leinatal and Hörsel.

Gotha is divided in 11 districts. The urban districts are Mitte, Weststadt, West, Nord, Süd, Oststadt and Ost and the rural districts are Boilstädt (incorporated in 1994), Siebleben (1922), Sundhausen (1974) and Uelleben (1994).

=== Demographics ===
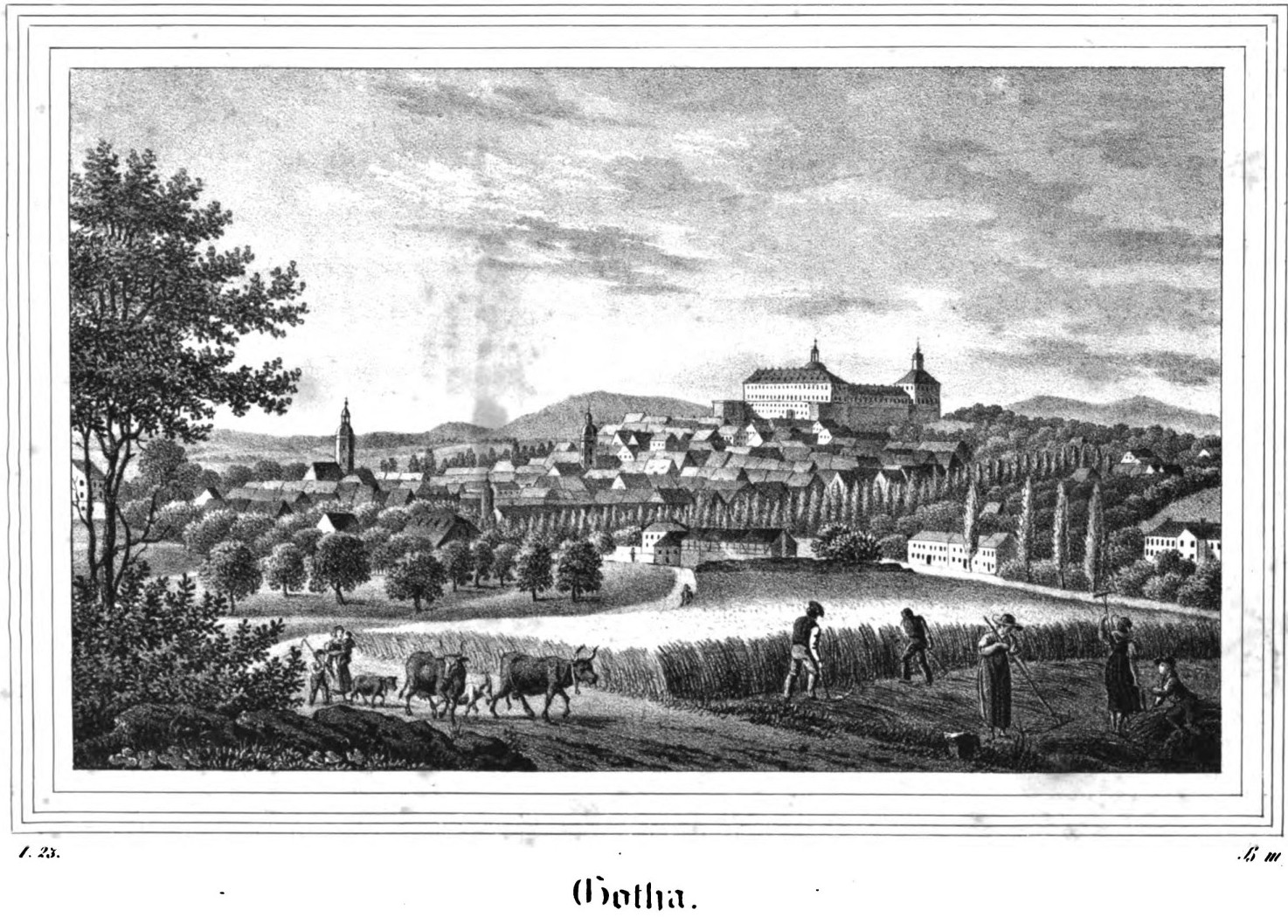
In 1835, Gotha was a mid-size town of 13,000 inhabitants

Gotha has long been one of the largest towns in Thuringia. During the Middle Ages, it was a town of 5,000 to 6,000 inhabitants and its selection as a ducal residence brought another impetus during the 17th and 18th century, so that Gotha had already more than 10,000 inhabitants by 1800. The number rose to 15,000 around 1850, as industrialisation started and the city was connected to the railway. The population saw a steady growth to 23,000 in 1875, 35,000 in 1900, 46,000 in 1925 and 58,000 in 1950, when the peak was reached. Until 1990, the population was roughly constant at around 57,000. After German reunification in 1990, the city saw a significant decline in population, it shrank to 48,000 by 2000 and to 44,000 by 2012. Between 2013 and 2016, the population rose in each consecutive year. In 2016 it reached 45,640.

The average decrease of population between 2009 and 2012 was -0.05% p.a, whereas the population in bordering rural regions has been shrinking with accelerating tendency. Suburbanization played only a small role in Gotha. It occurred after reunification for a short time in the 1990s, but most of the suburban areas are situated within the administrative city borders. During the 1990s and the early 2000s, many inhabitants left Gotha to search for a better life in west Germany or other major east German cities like Jena or Erfurt. Since 2005, emigration is not a big issue anymore. Today, the birth deficit, also caused by the high average age of the population, is becoming a bigger problem because immigration is not sufficient to compensate for it in recent years.

Despite urban planning activities to tear down unused flats, vacancy was a problem with rates around 9% in 2011 but declined to 4% in 2017. A side effect of the high vacancy rate is Gotha's low rent level.

The birth deficit was 175 in 2012, this is -3.9 per 1,000 inhabitants (Thuringian average: -4.5; national average: -2.4). The net migration rate was +6.2 per 1,000 inhabitants in 2012 (Thuringian average: -0.8; national average: +4.6). The most important regions of origin of Gotha migrants are bordering rural areas of Thuringia as well as foreign countries like Poland, Russia, Ukraine, Hungary, Serbia, Romania and Bulgaria.

Like other eastern German cities, foreigners account for only a small share of Gotha's population: circa 2.5% are non-Germans by citizenship and overall 7.1% are classified as migrants (according to the 2011 EU census). In contrast to the national average, the largest groups of migrants in Gotha were Russians, Vietnamese and Ukrainians.

Due to the official atheism of the former GDR, most of the population is non-religious. According to the 2011 EU census, 18.2% then were members of the Evangelical Church in Central Germany and 4.8% were Catholics.

== Culture, sights and cityscape ==
=== Museums ===
Gotha hosts various museums, which are – together with the ducal buildings – promoted as the Gothaer Barock-Universum ("Baroque universe of Gotha").

- Friedenstein Castle hosts the following museums:
  - The Ekhof Theatre is a Baroque court theatre and the world's only 17th century theatre with original stage machinery still working.
  - The Historic Museum hosts an exhibition about municipal and regional history and culture of Gotha.
  - The Museum of Nature shows a natural history exhibition with animals, minerals and fossils.
  - The Castle Museum contains the former ducal living rooms and several items of cultural history.
- The Ducal Museum opposite to the castle hosts the ducal collection of art, containing Egyptian antiques, Renaissance Old Masters paintings, Chinese and Meissen porcelaine and more.
- The Insurance Museum at Bahnhofstraße is Germany's only museum on the history of the insurance business, which has been important in Gotha since 1820.
- The Tivoli at Cosmarstraße is the place where the Social Democratic Party of Germany was founded and hosts a small exhibition on the party's history.

==== Image gallery ====
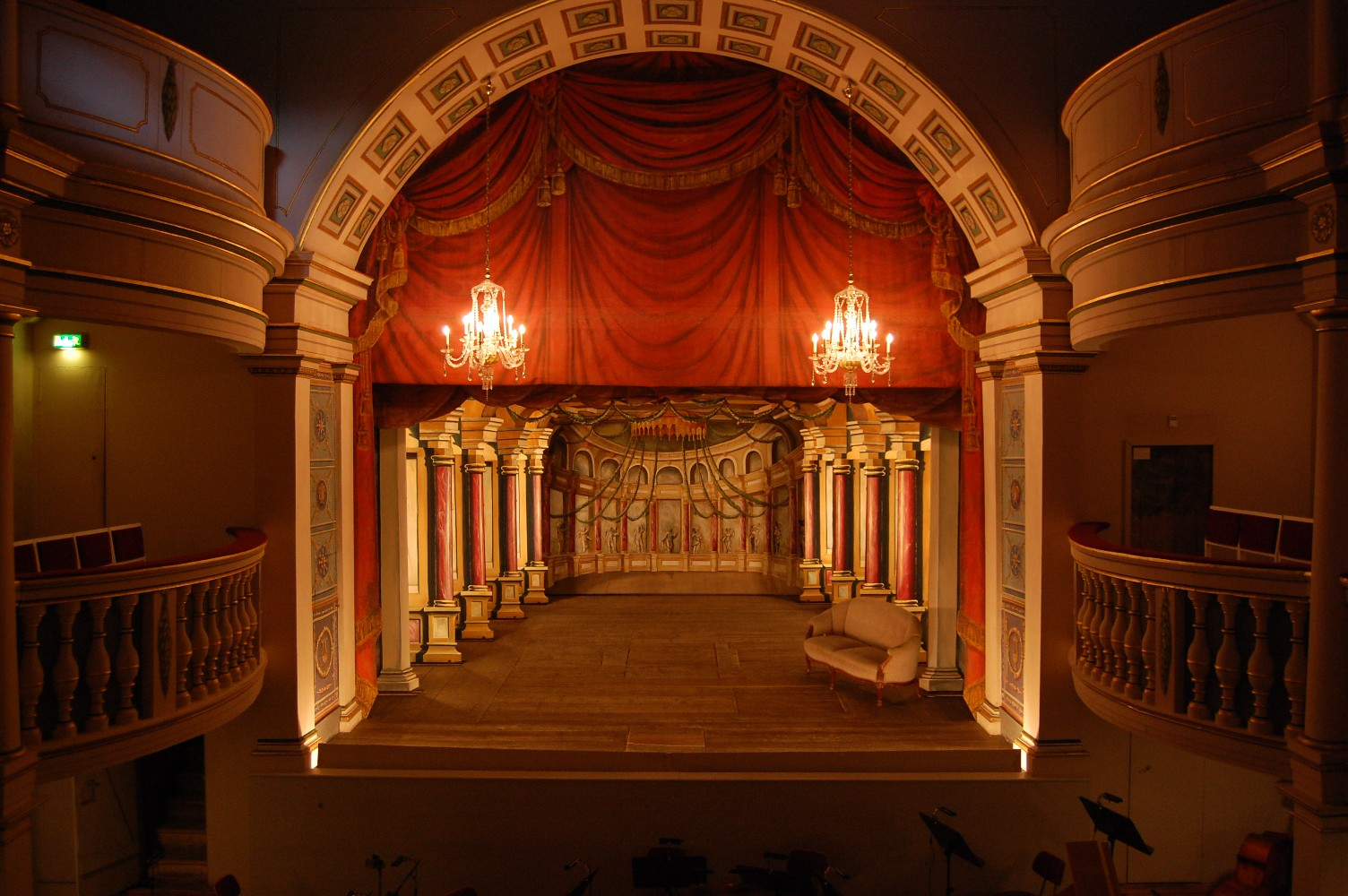
Ekhof Theatre

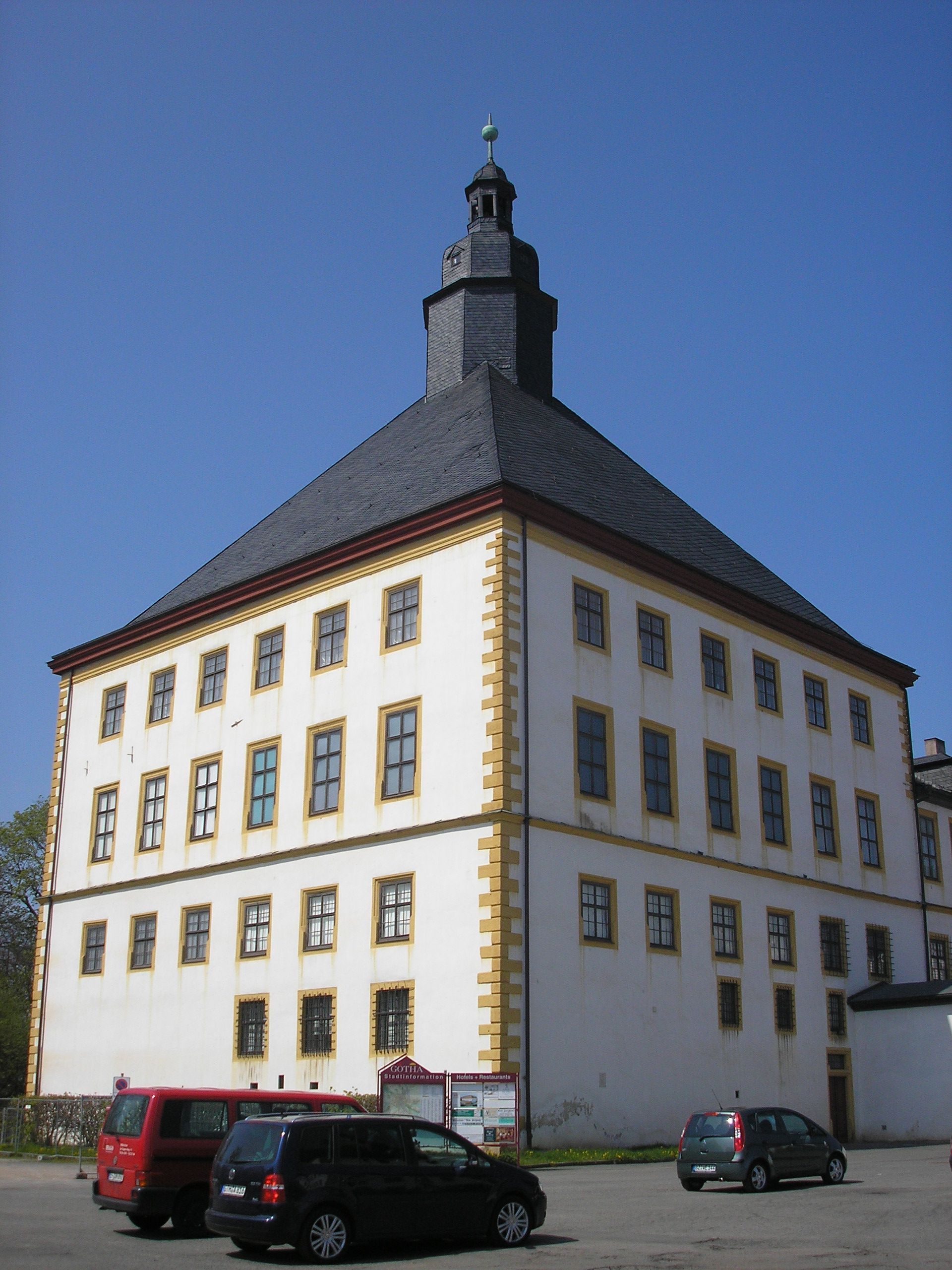
The Historic Museum and the Museum of Nature are located in Friedenstein's western tower

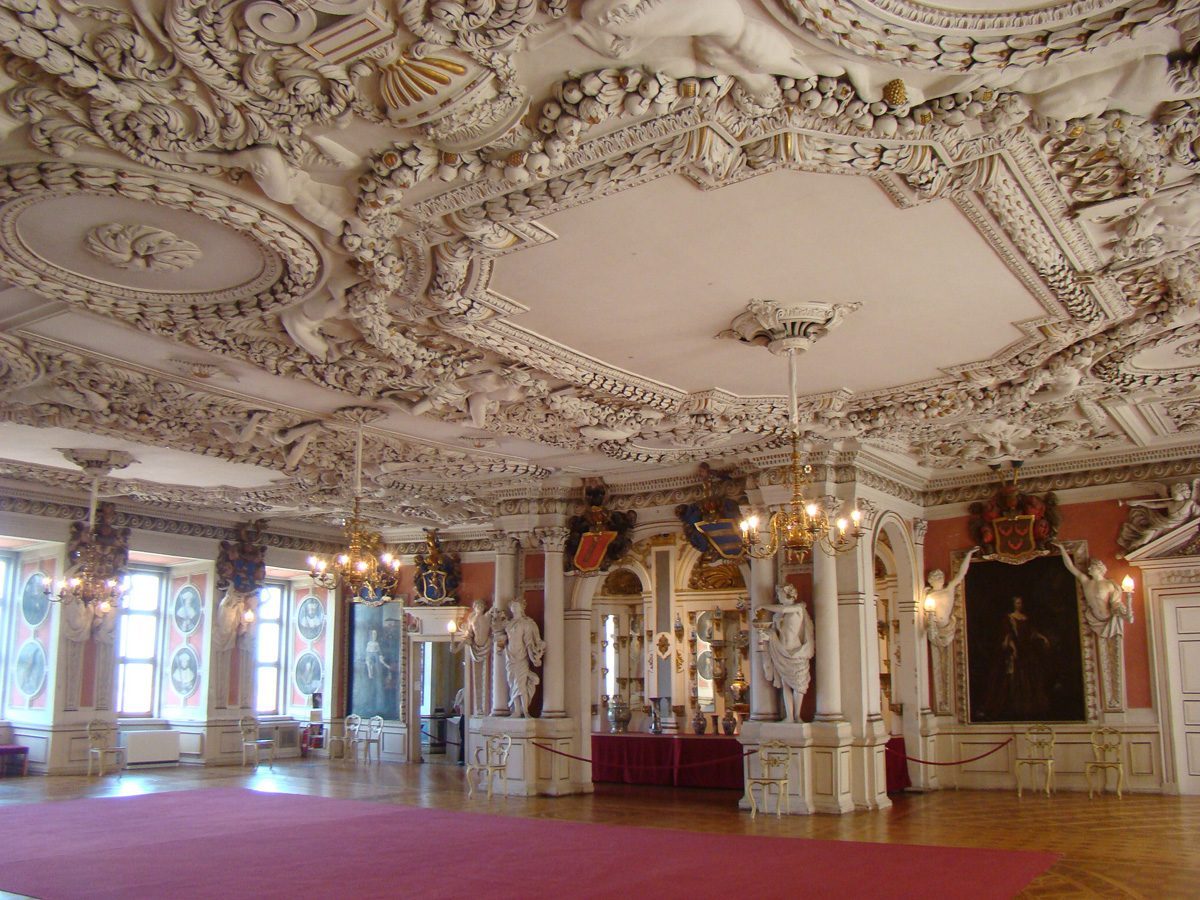
One of the rooms at Castle Museum

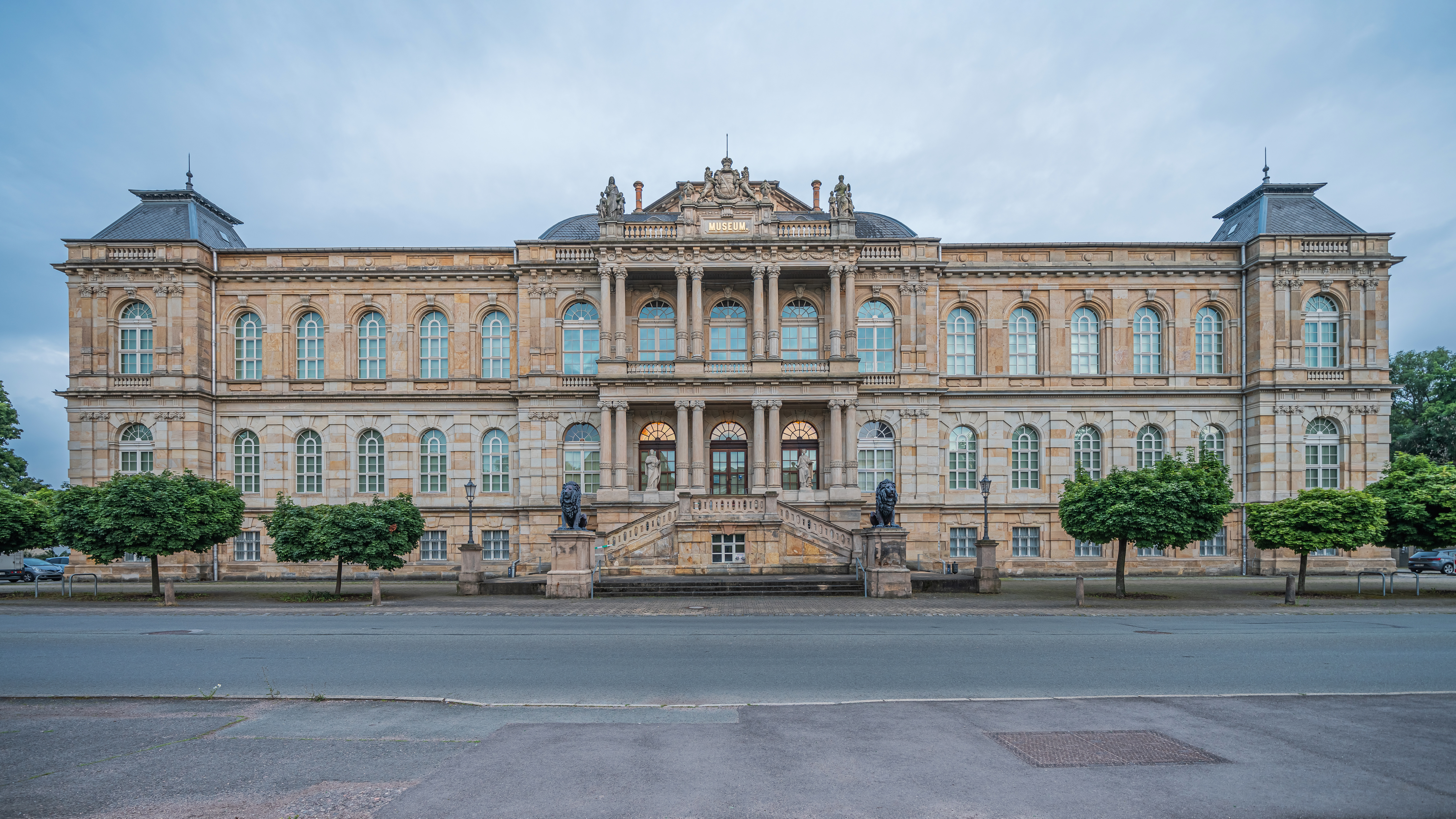
Ducal Museum – Gotha's art historical and antiquities museum

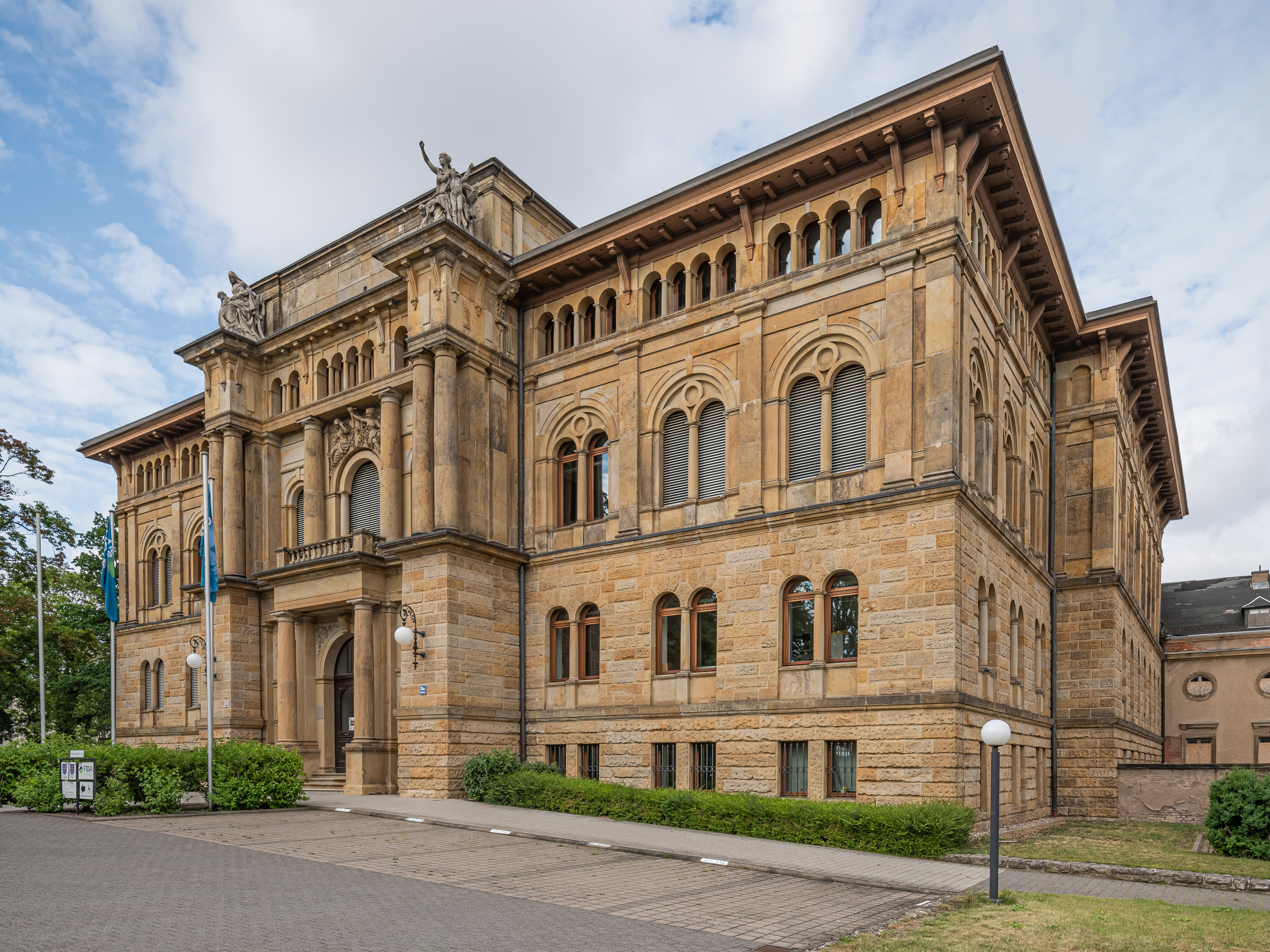
Insurance Museum

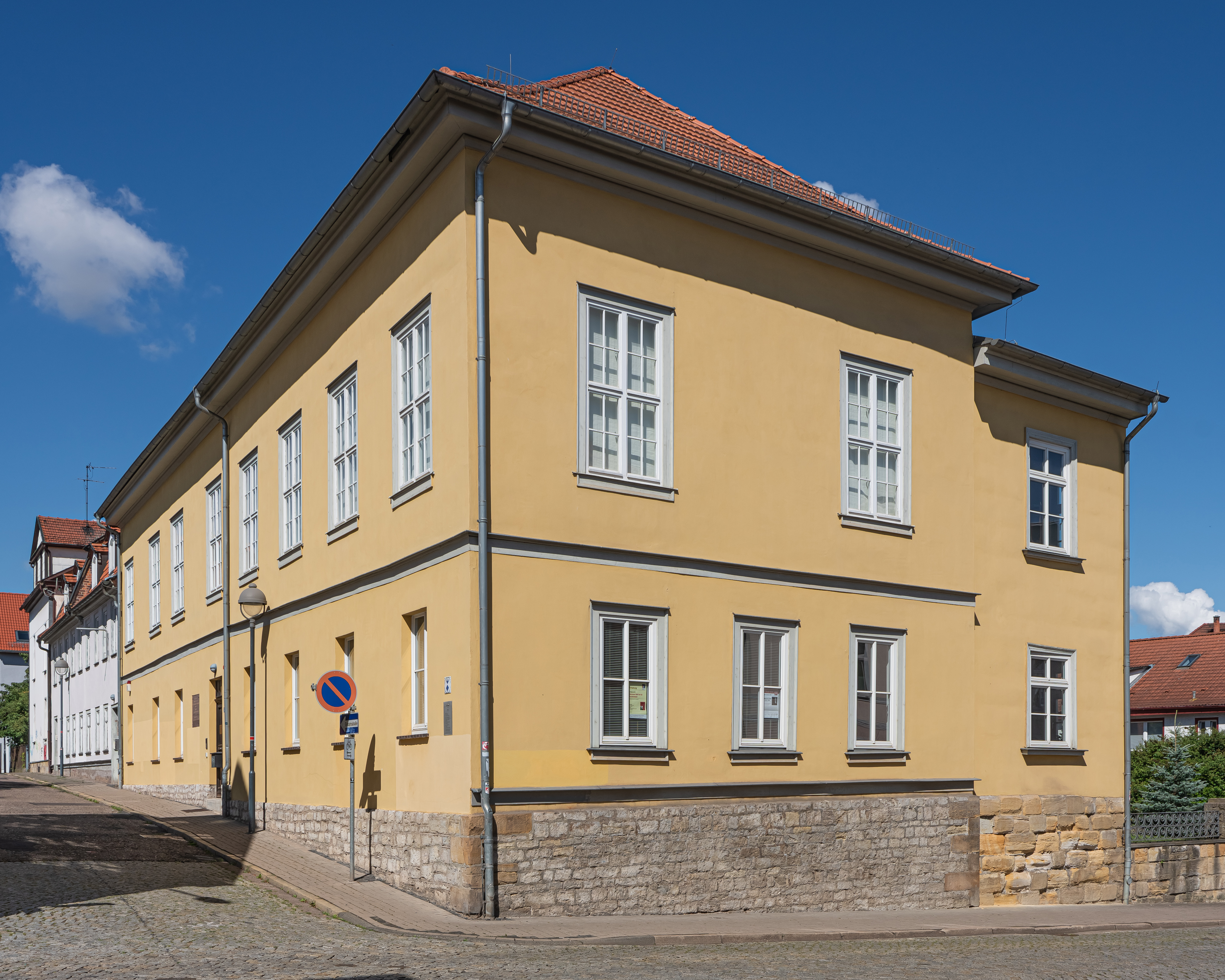
Tivoli

=== Cityscape ===
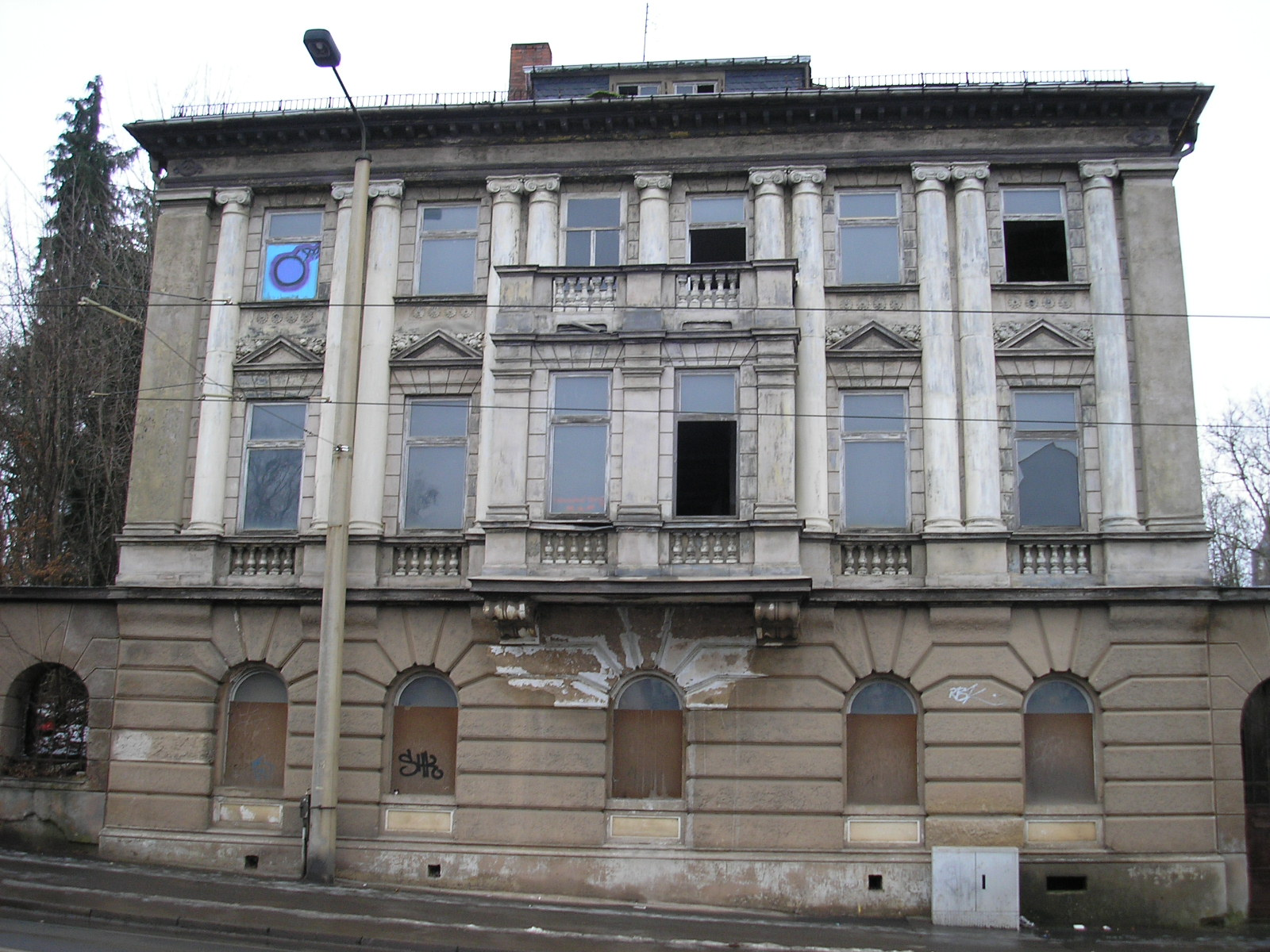
A typical derelict late-19th century mansion near the city centre

The city centre of Gotha has two medieval parts: the old town around Hauptmarkt and the new town around Neumarkt. Both were walled until 1810, when the city walls were broken down and a boulevard was laid out in their place. Early-modern suburbiums were established to the south-west (around Dreikronengasse), to the west (around Große Fahnenstraße) and to the east (around Mohrenberg). The later 19th century brought larger growth in all directions. Especially the axis between the main station and the city centre received a representative development in capital-city style. Due to Gotha's function as a ducal residence, most buildings built between 1870 and 1914 were generous in size and many mansions were built. Only some outer districts show the typical German working-class tenements (e.g. around Oststraße and Seebergstraße). The largest Plattenbau settlement of Gotha was established at the western periphery during the late GDR period. In the 1980s, large areas of the western old town were demolished and replaced by small-scale Plattenbau houses. After 1990, many buildings were thoroughly refurbished after having fallen into dereliction during GDR times. Nevertheless, a relatively large share of ruined historic buildings remains characteristic for Gotha (in comparison to neighbouring cities like Eisenach, Erfurt or Weimar), especially within the historic new town and the 19th century belt around the city centre. The government sometimes failed to conserve historic buildings, for example the Volkshaus zum Mohren was demolished in 2007, as was the Winterpalais in 2011 (although the latter has now being reconstructed externally). The Orangerie (Gotha) was saved in 2006, and the Prinzenpalais was restored in 2017 although the adjacent Kavaliershaus was demolished.

=== Sights and architectural heritage ===
==== Churches ====
- The main Protestant church St. Margarethen at Neumarkt was built between 1494 and 1543 in late-Gothic style.
- The Protestant church St. Salvator at Klosterplatz is a former monastery of the Augustinians, built around 1300 in Gothic style and dissolved in 1525.
- The ducal chapel inside Friedenstein Castle is located at the north-eastern corner and was designed in 1697.
- The Protestant Friedrichskirche at Erfurter Landstraße was built between 1712 and 1715 in Baroque style.
- The Protestant church St. Helena at Siebleben district was built between 1818 and 1827 in Neo-Classical style.
- The Catholic parish church St. Bonifatius at Moßlerstraße was built in 1855 in Neo-Romanesque style.
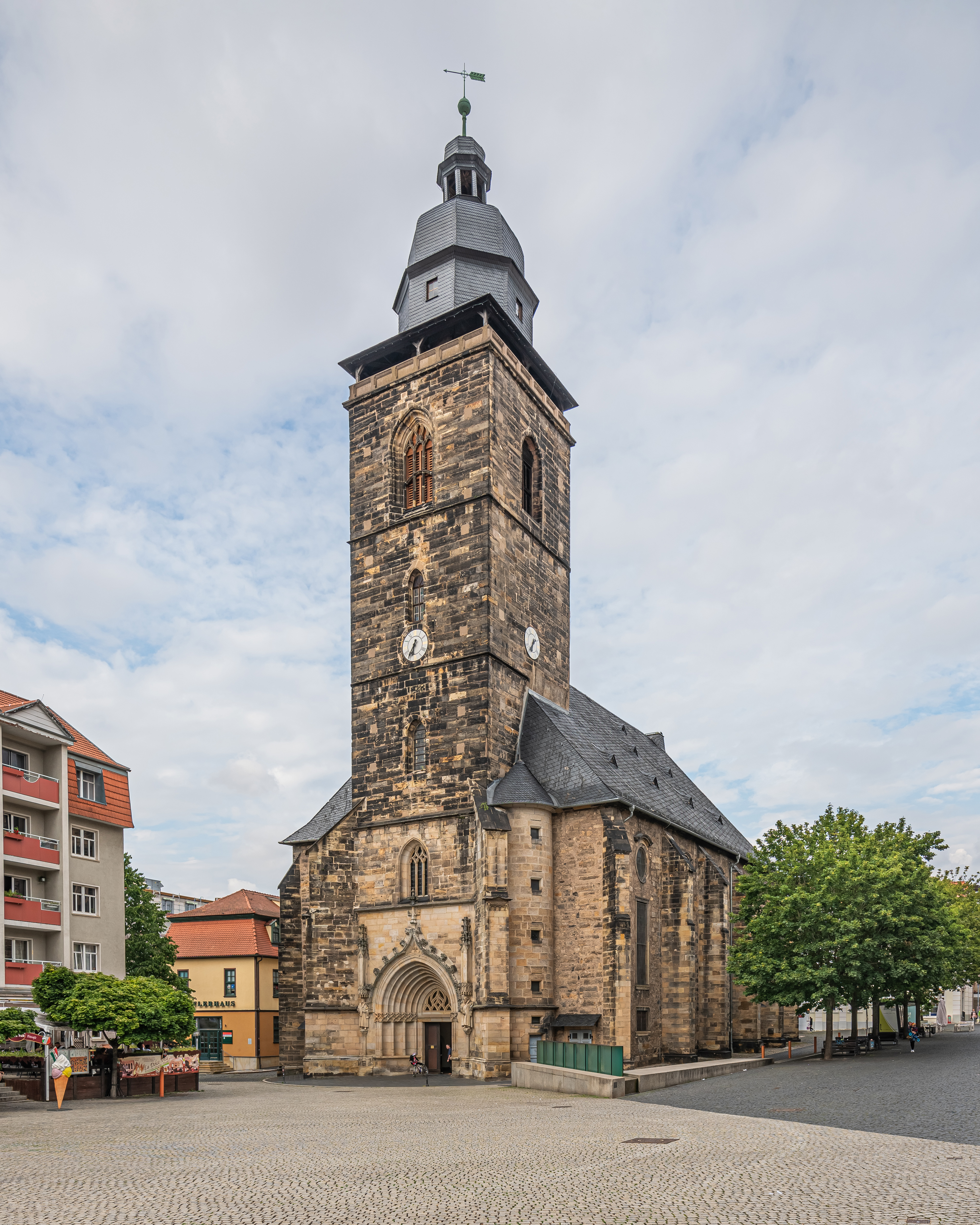
St. Margarethen

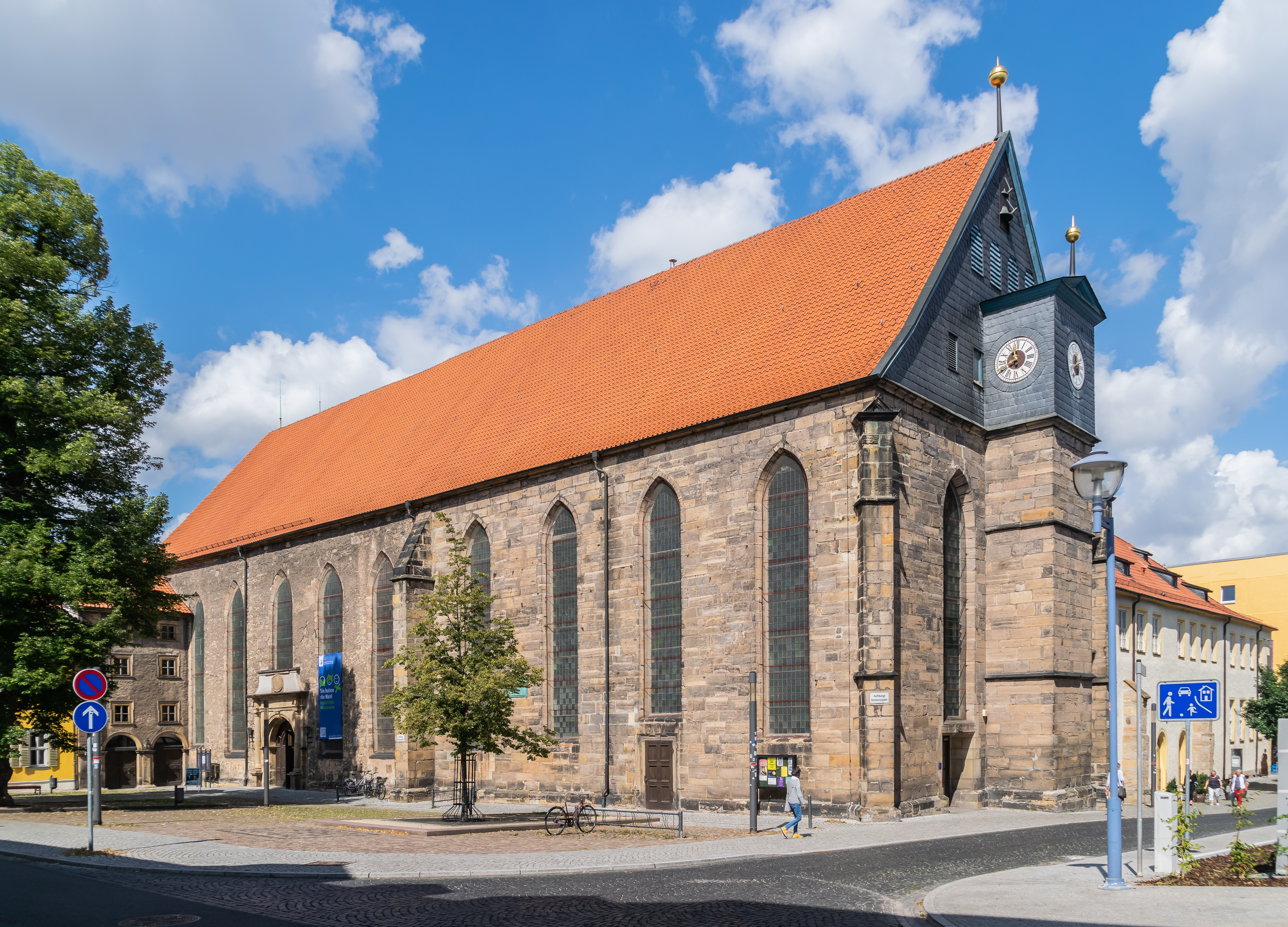
St. Salvator

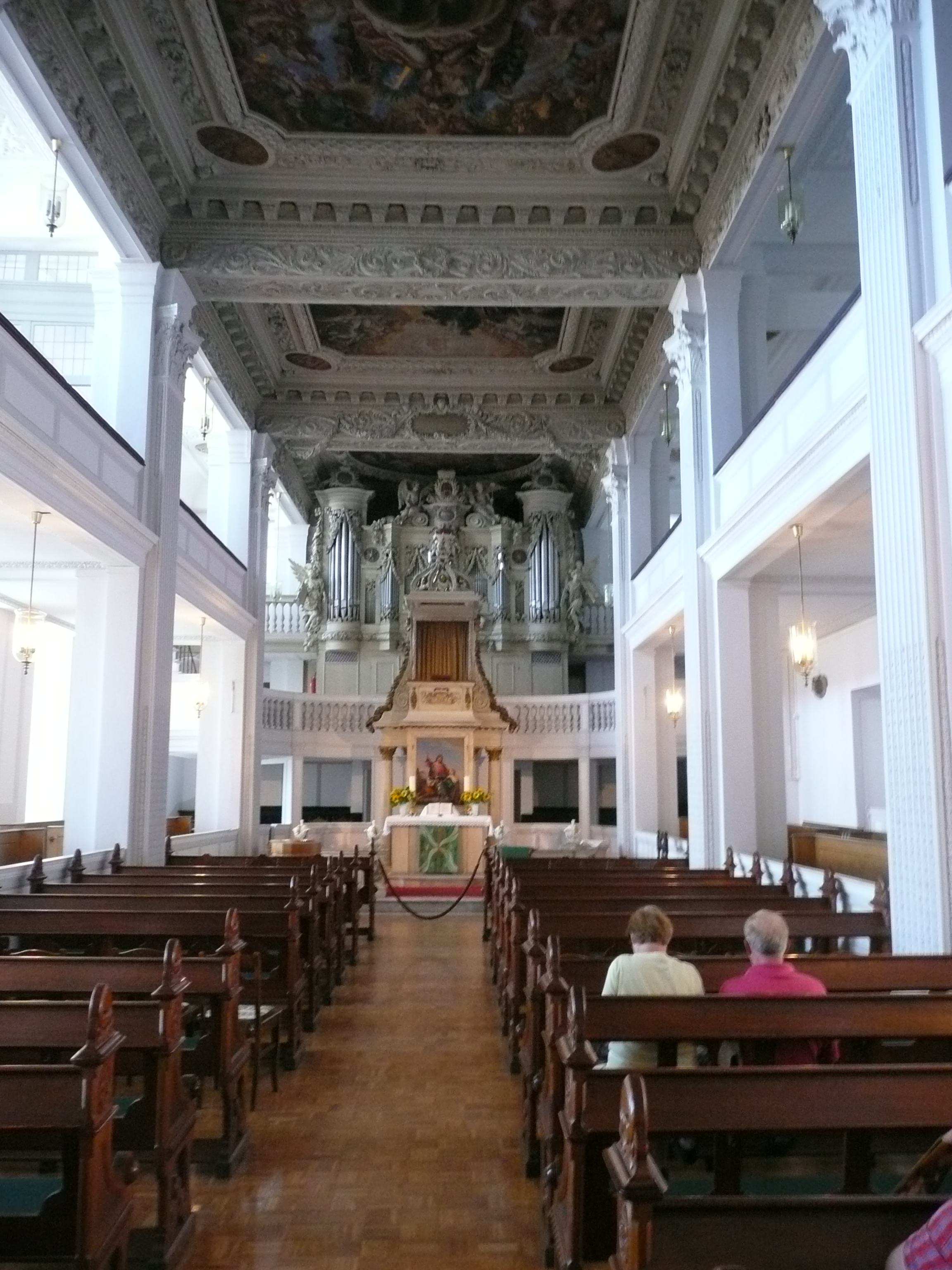
Ducal chapel inside Friedenstein Castle

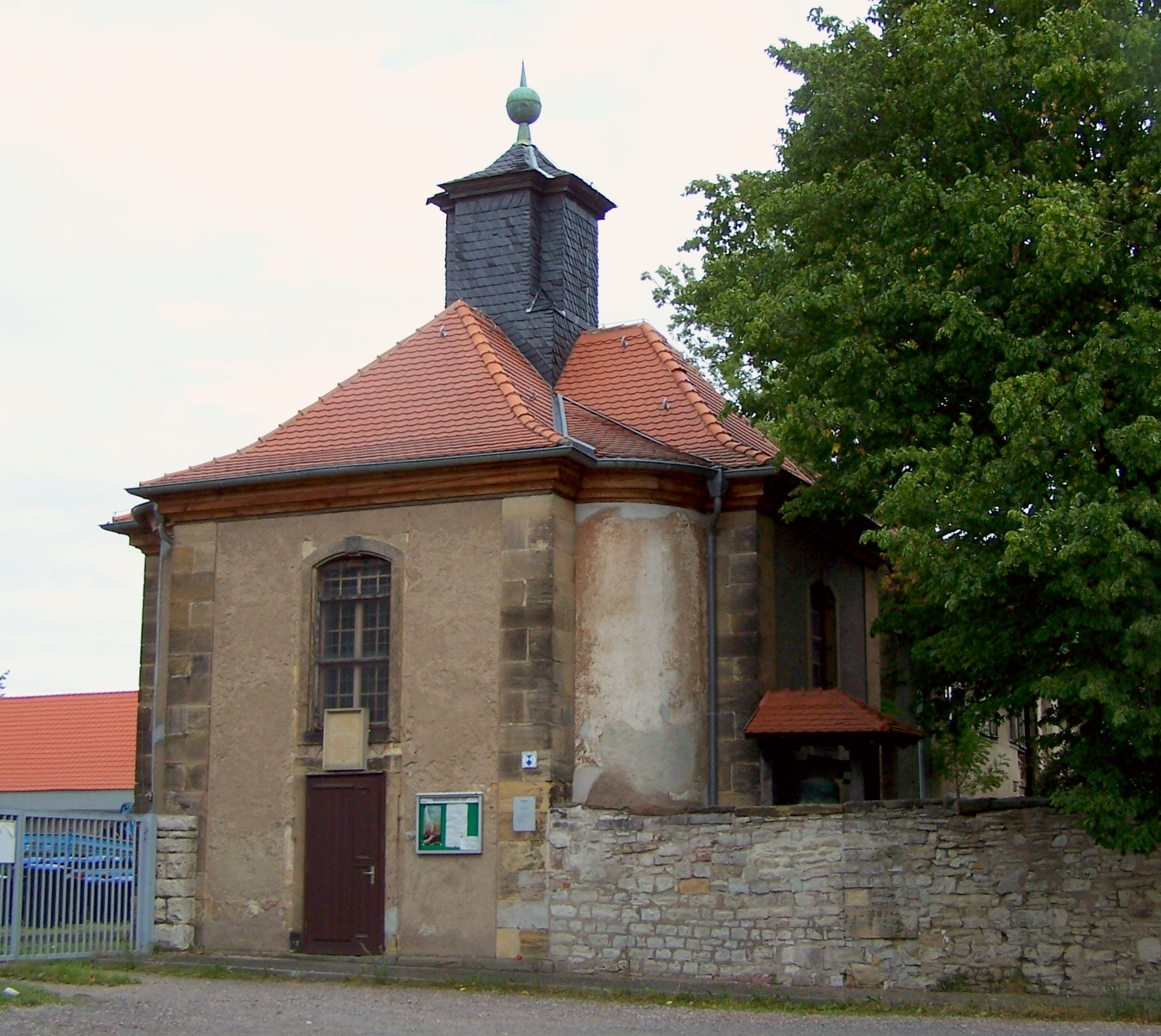
Friedrichskirche

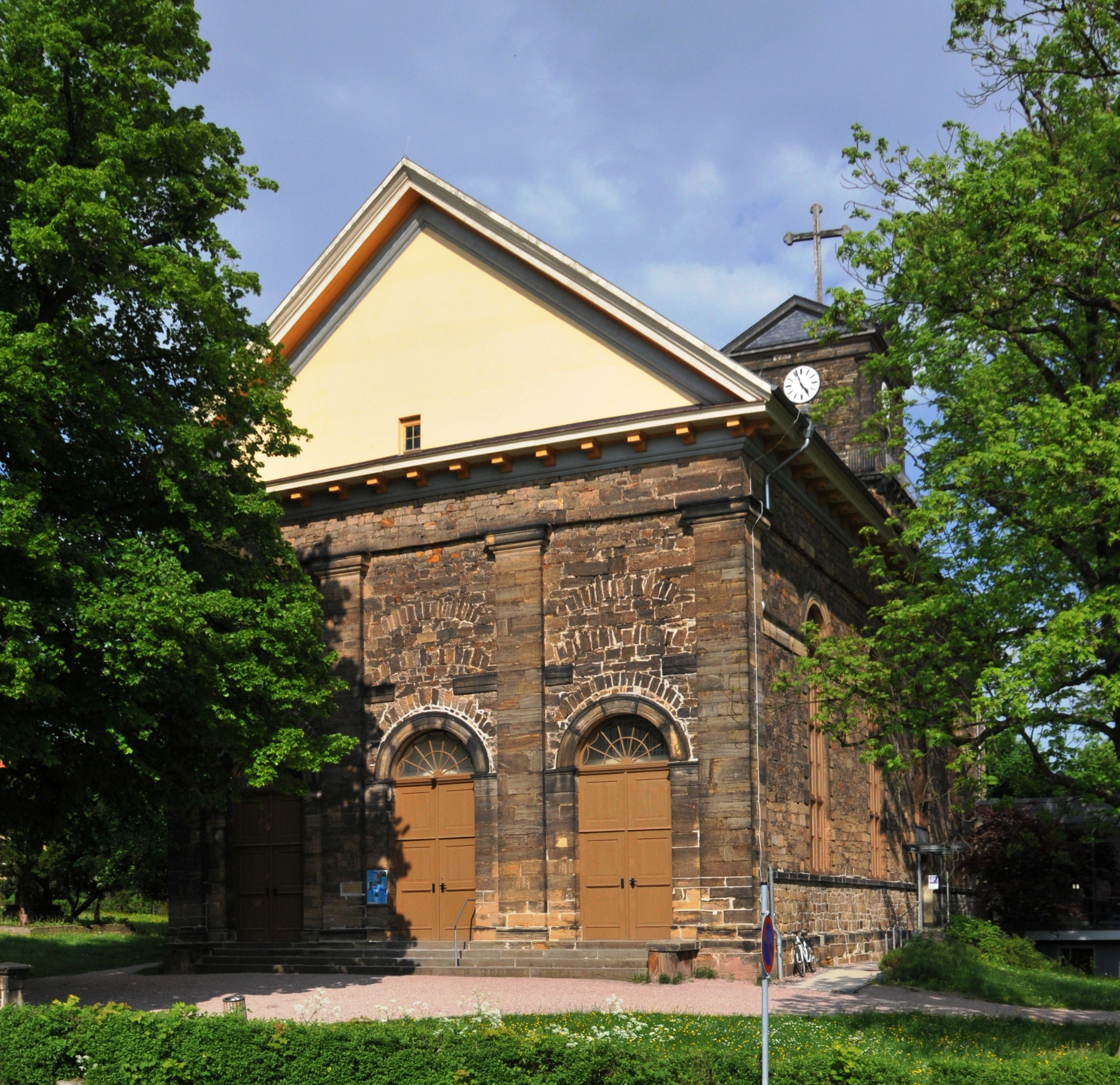
St. Helena

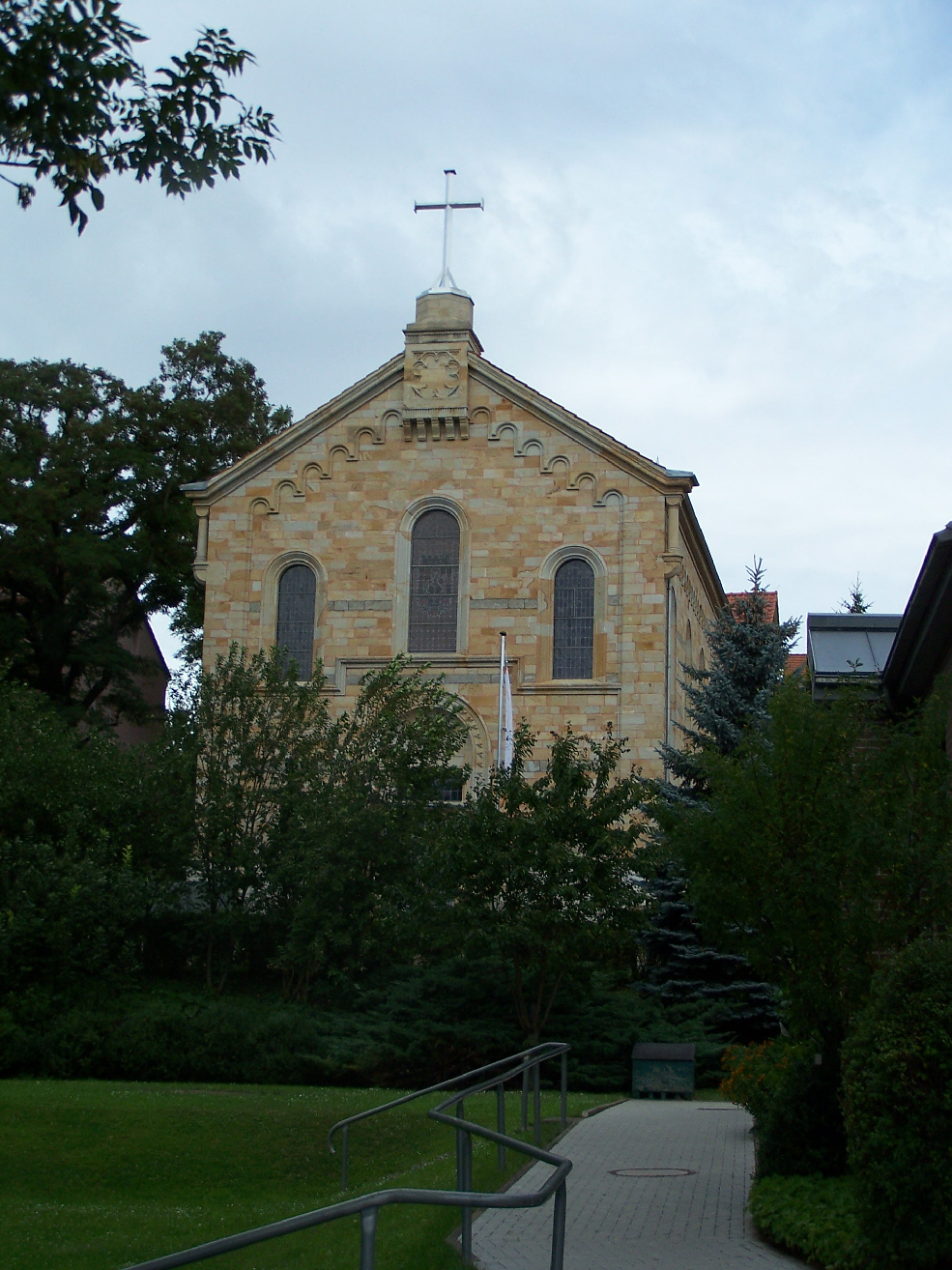
St. Bonifatius

==== Castles and palaces ====
- The former residence of the Saxe-Gotha dukes is Friedenstein Castle, one of the largest late-Renaissance/early-Baroque styled castles in Germany. It consists of three wings in U-form with two towers at their ends and was built between 1643 1654.
- The Schloss Friedrichsthal at Friedrichstraße is the former ducal summer residence, built between 1707 and 1711 in French Baroque style.
- The Winterpalais at Friedrichstraße is the former ducal winter residence, built in 1822 in neo-classical style.
- The Orangerie at Friedrichstraße consists of two symmetric orangery houses and a Baroque park in between, built between 1747 and 1774.
- The Prinzenpalais at Mozartstraße was the ducal guesthouse, built in 1776.
- The Marstall at Parkallee was the ducal stables, built in 1847.
- The Schloss Mönchhof at Siebleben district was a ducal summer residence, built in the late 18th century.
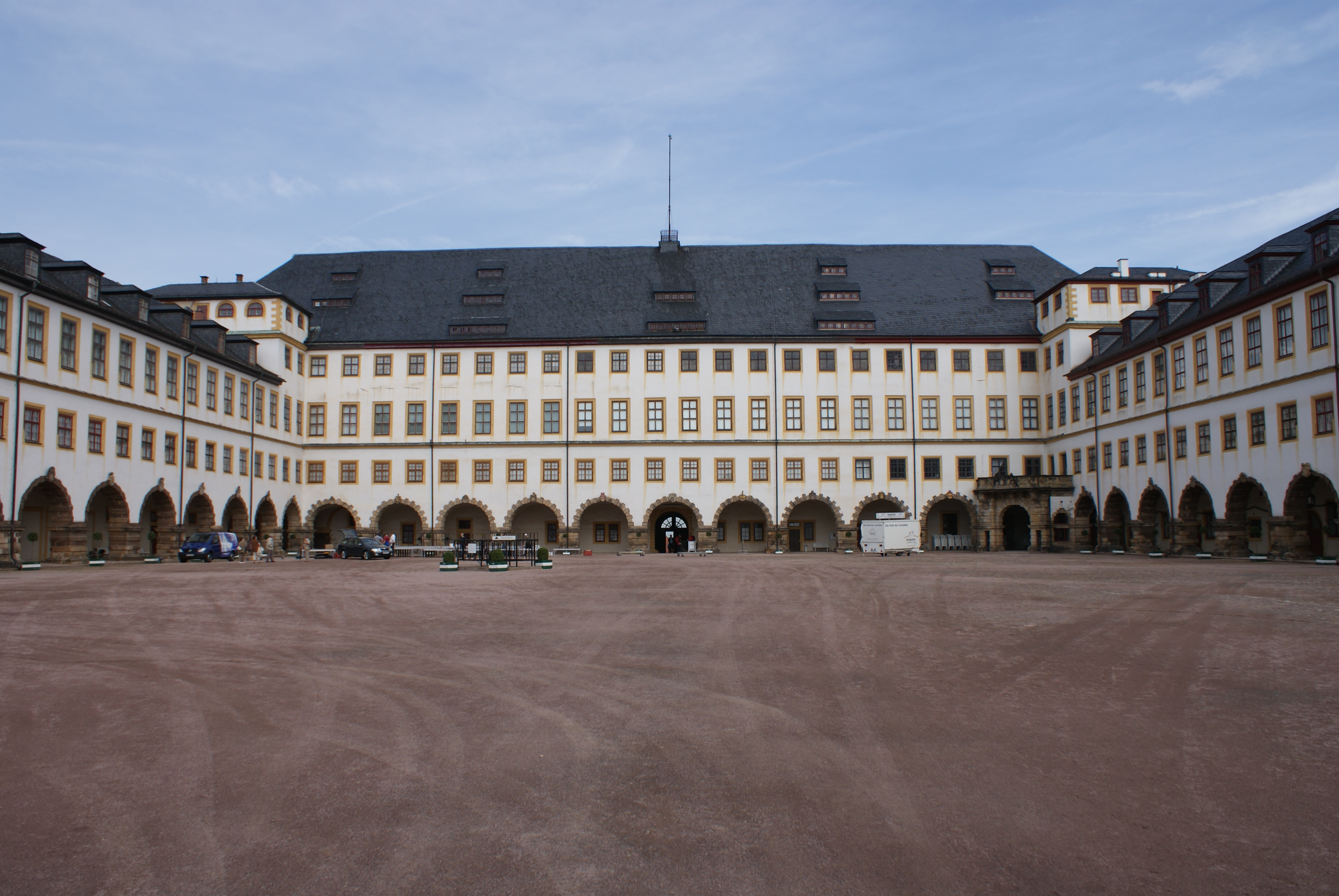
Patio of Friedenstein Castle

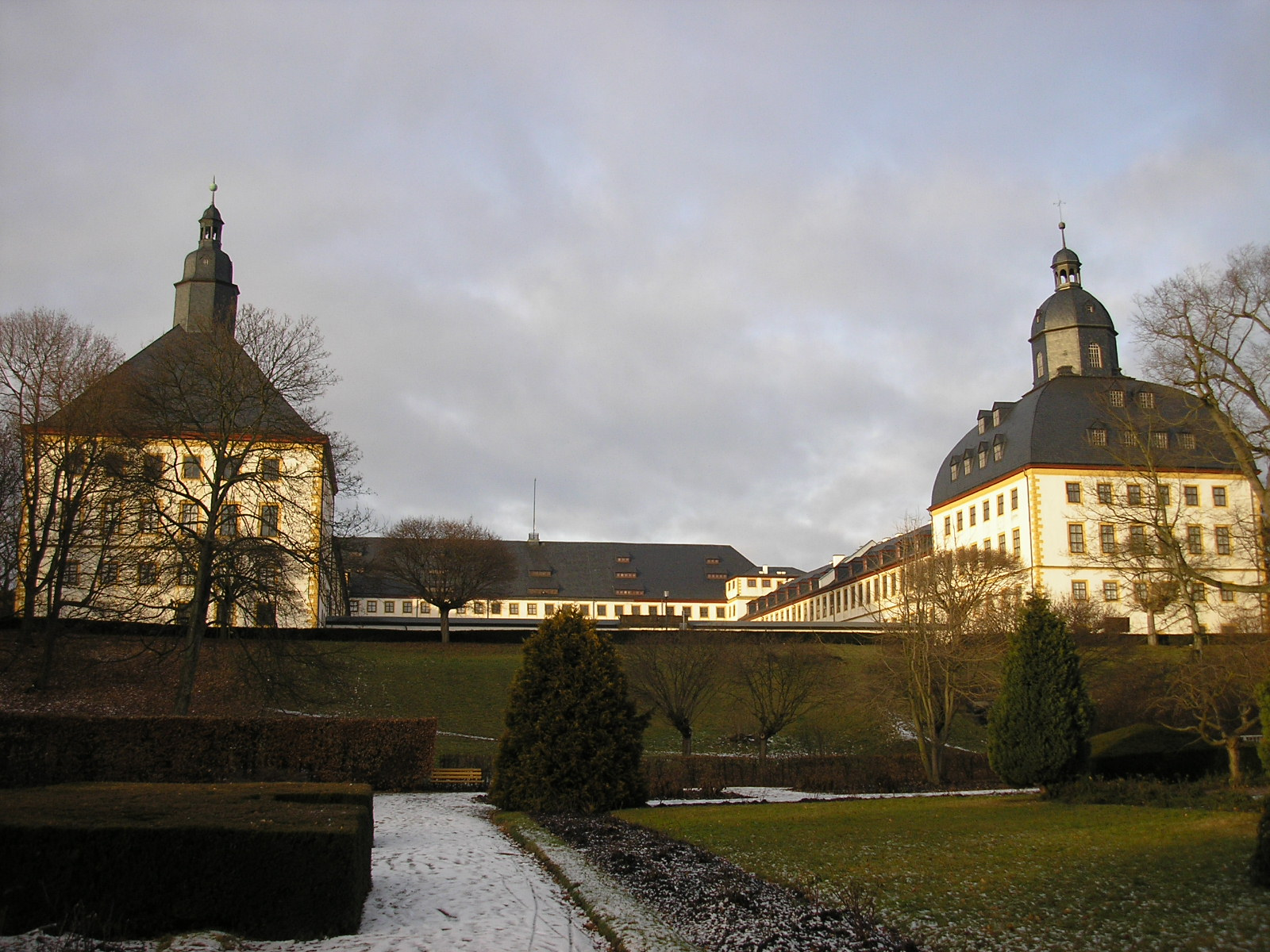
Towers of Friedenstein Castle

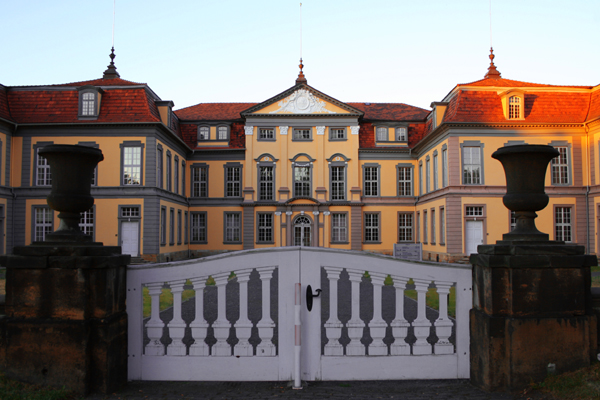
Schloss Friedrichsthal

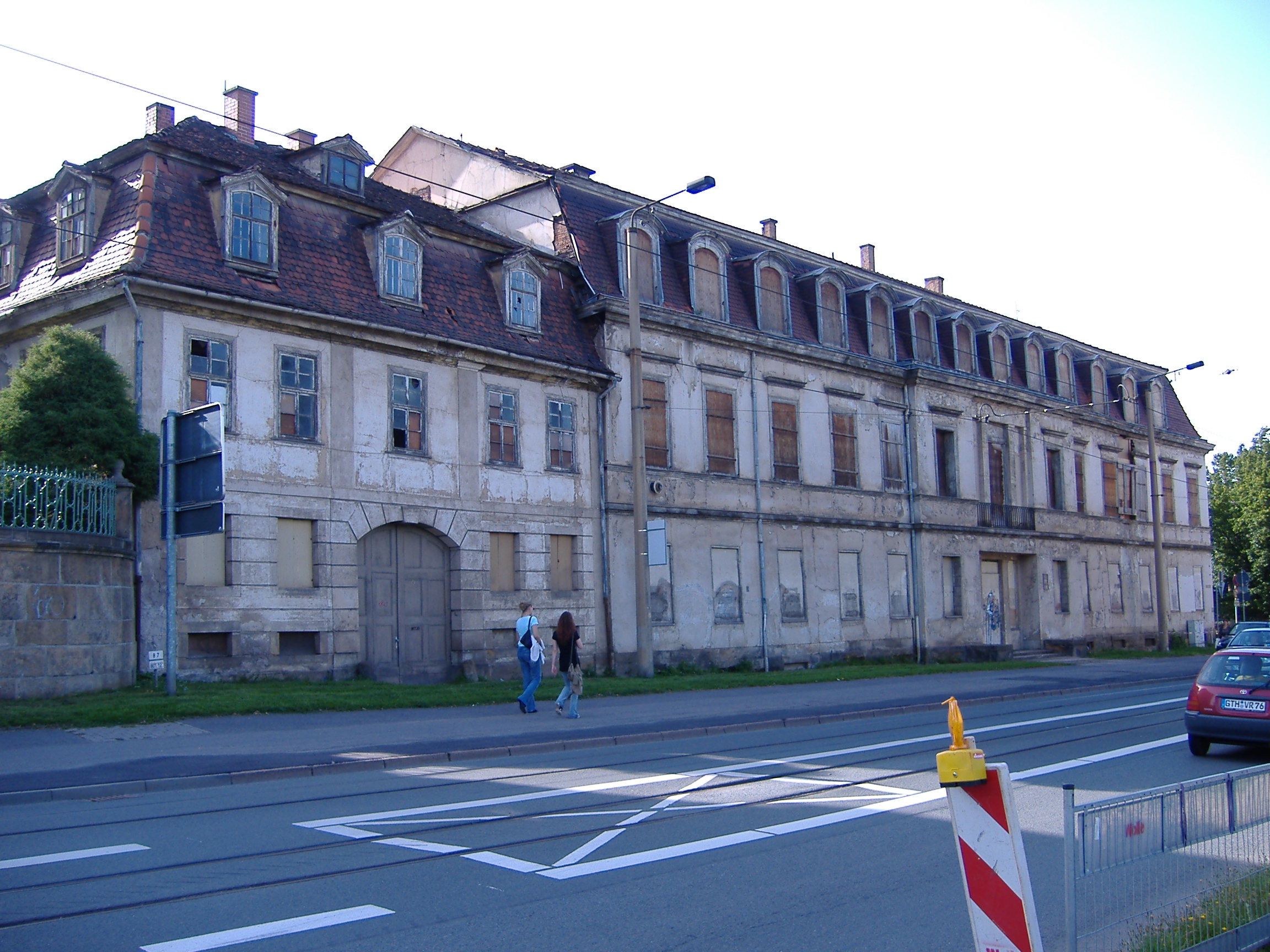
Winterpalais

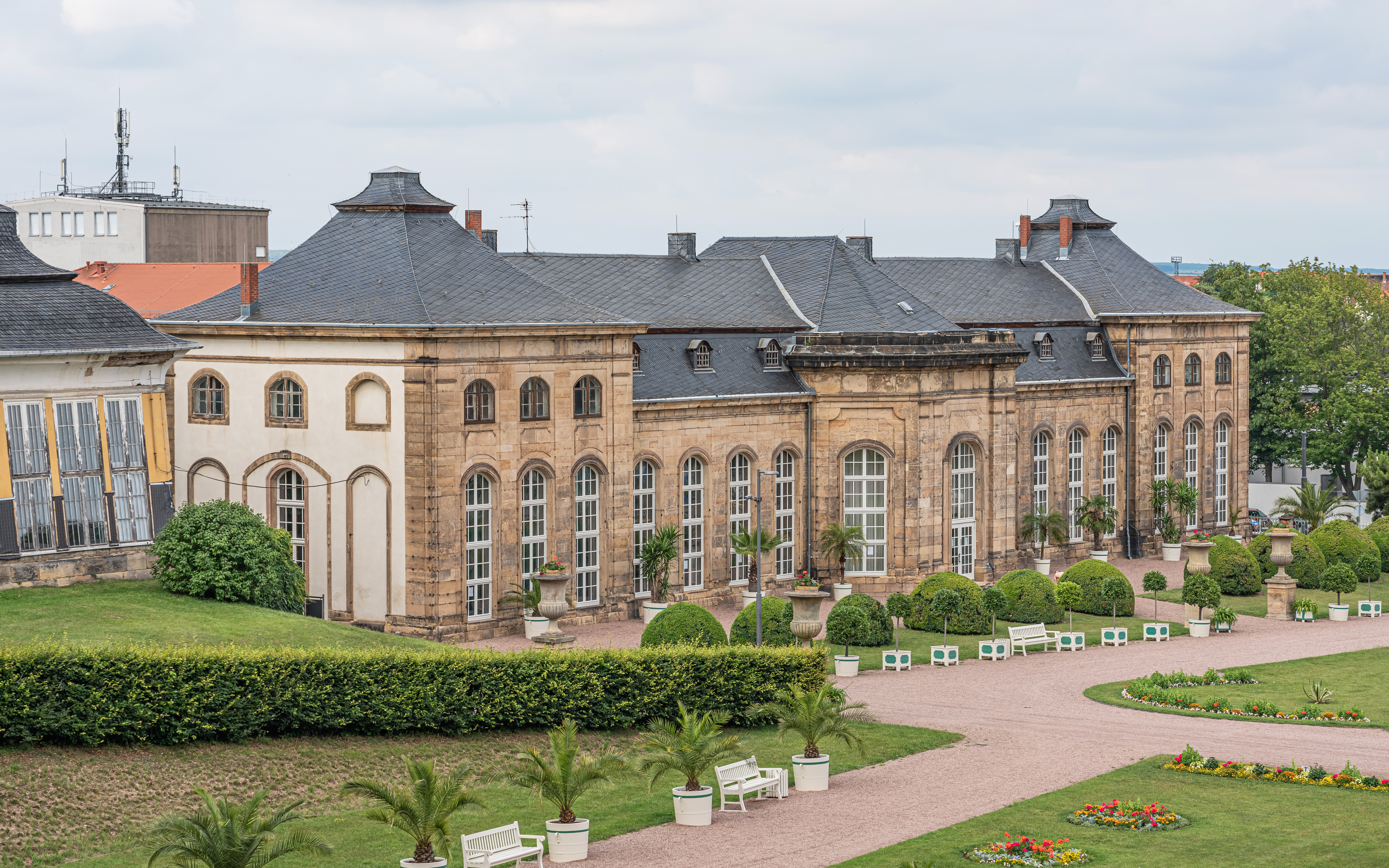
Orangerie (northern building)

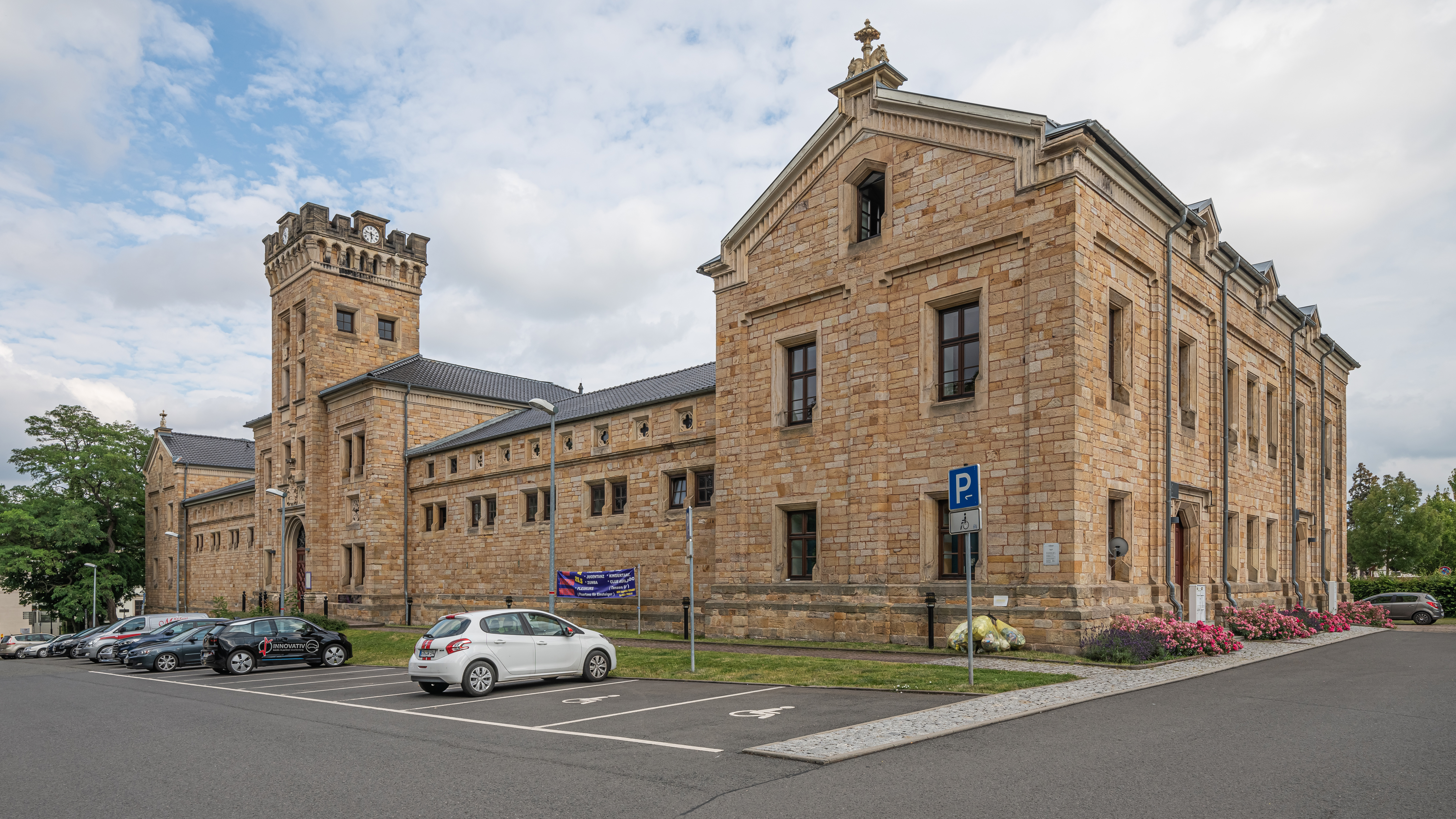
Marstall

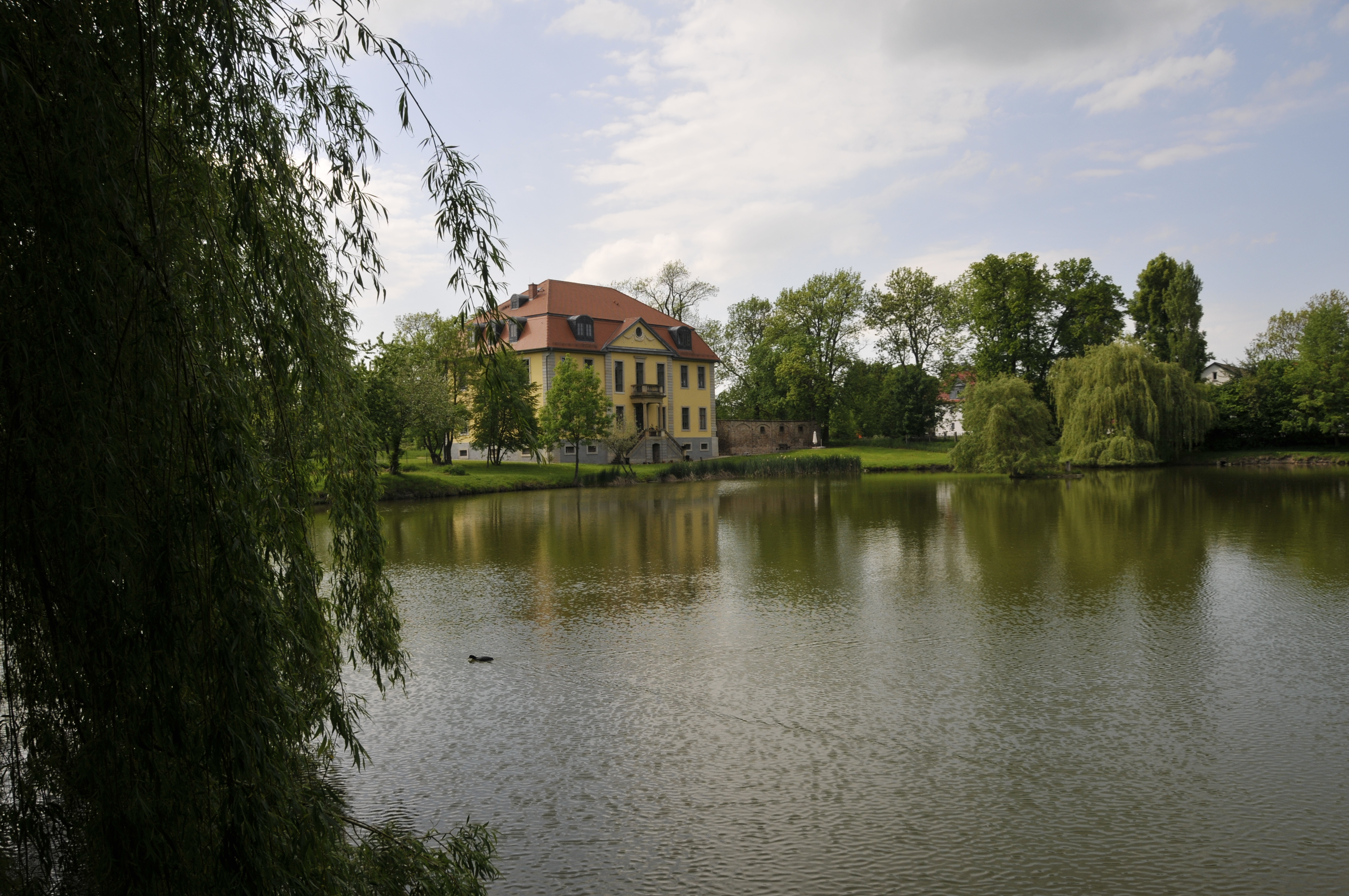
Schloss Mönchhof

==== Other sights ====
- The town hall at Hauptmarkt was built as a bourse between 1566 and 1574 in Renaissance style. It has been in use as town hall since 1665.
- There are some Renaissance patricians' houses around Hauptmarkt and Brühl, showing the city's wealth through the 15th and 16th centuries.
- The Hospital St. Mary is the former city hospital and was built between 1716 and 1719 in Baroque style.
- The Crematorium at the main cemetery is the oldest one in Germany, established in 1878.
- The Wasserkunst (water feature) at Schlossberg were established in 1895 with three cascades traversed by water from the Leinakanal.
- The Courthouse at Justus-Perthes-Straße was built in 1895/96 in historicistic forms.
- The 19th and early-20th century school buildings in Gotha are of impressive size and design, for example the Ernestinum (1837/38) at Bergallee, the Myconiusschule (1865) at Bürgeraue, the Herzog-Ernst-Schule at Reinhardsbrunner Straße, the Andreas-Reyher-Schule (1898–1900) at Mozartstraße, the Arnoldischule (1909–1911) at Eisenacher Straße and the former Baugewerbeschule (1910/11) at Trützschlerplatz.
- Many of the banks' and insurances' buildings of Gotha are also architecturally interesting. They were built during Gotha's time as a centre of the finance industry around 1900. The Deutsche Grundkreditbank at Bahnhofstraße (1872–1877) was built by Ludwig Bohnstedt, as was the Gothaer Feuerversicherung (1872–1874) at Bahnhofstraße and the Gothaer Privatbank (1873–1877) at Ekhofplatz. The Gothaer Lebensversicherung (1893/94) was built by Bruno Eelbo at Bahnhofstraße and the Ducal Cashier's Office (1908) at Justus-Perthes-Straße was built by Alfred Cramer.
- The garden city Am Schmalen Rain was built in 1928 in garden-city style like Hellerau near Dresden.
- The Stadtbad Gotha is an Art Nouveau-style public bathhouse built in 1909 and restored in 2014.
- Perthesforum, opened in 2014, and containing the Perthes archives (185,000 maps, 120,000 geographical publications and approximately 800 metres business archives) of Justus Perthes (publishing company).
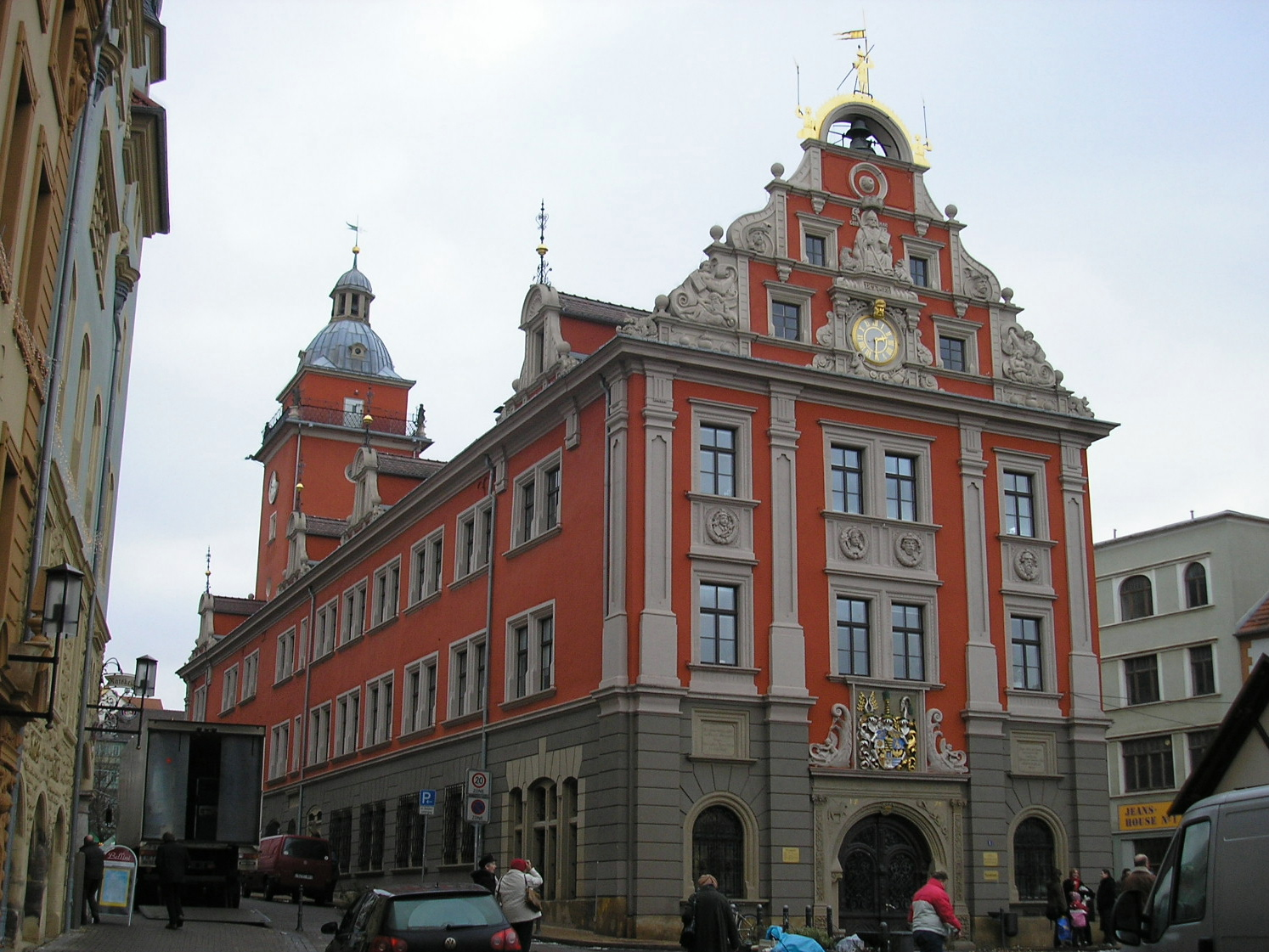
Town hall

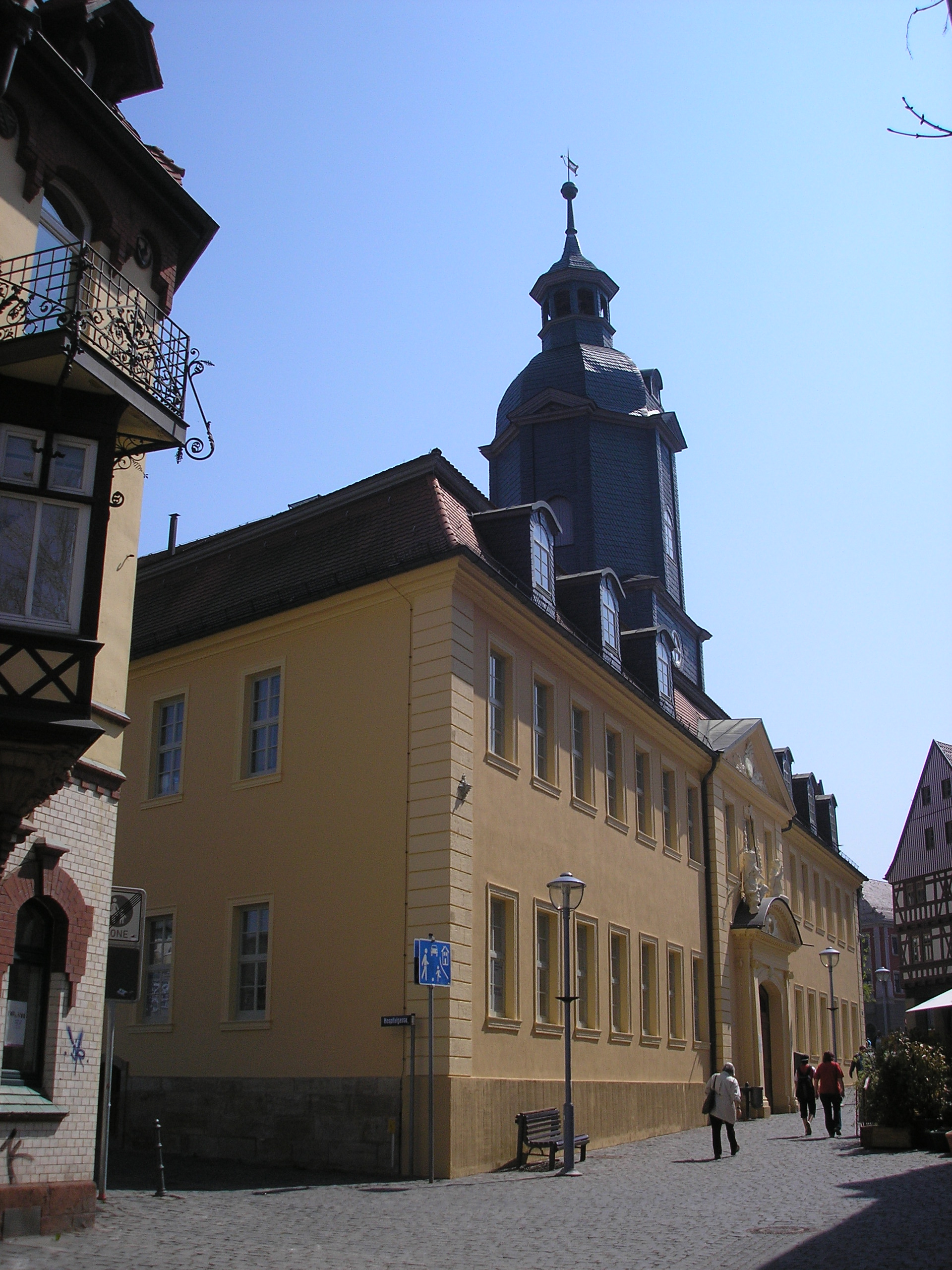
St. Mary's Hospital

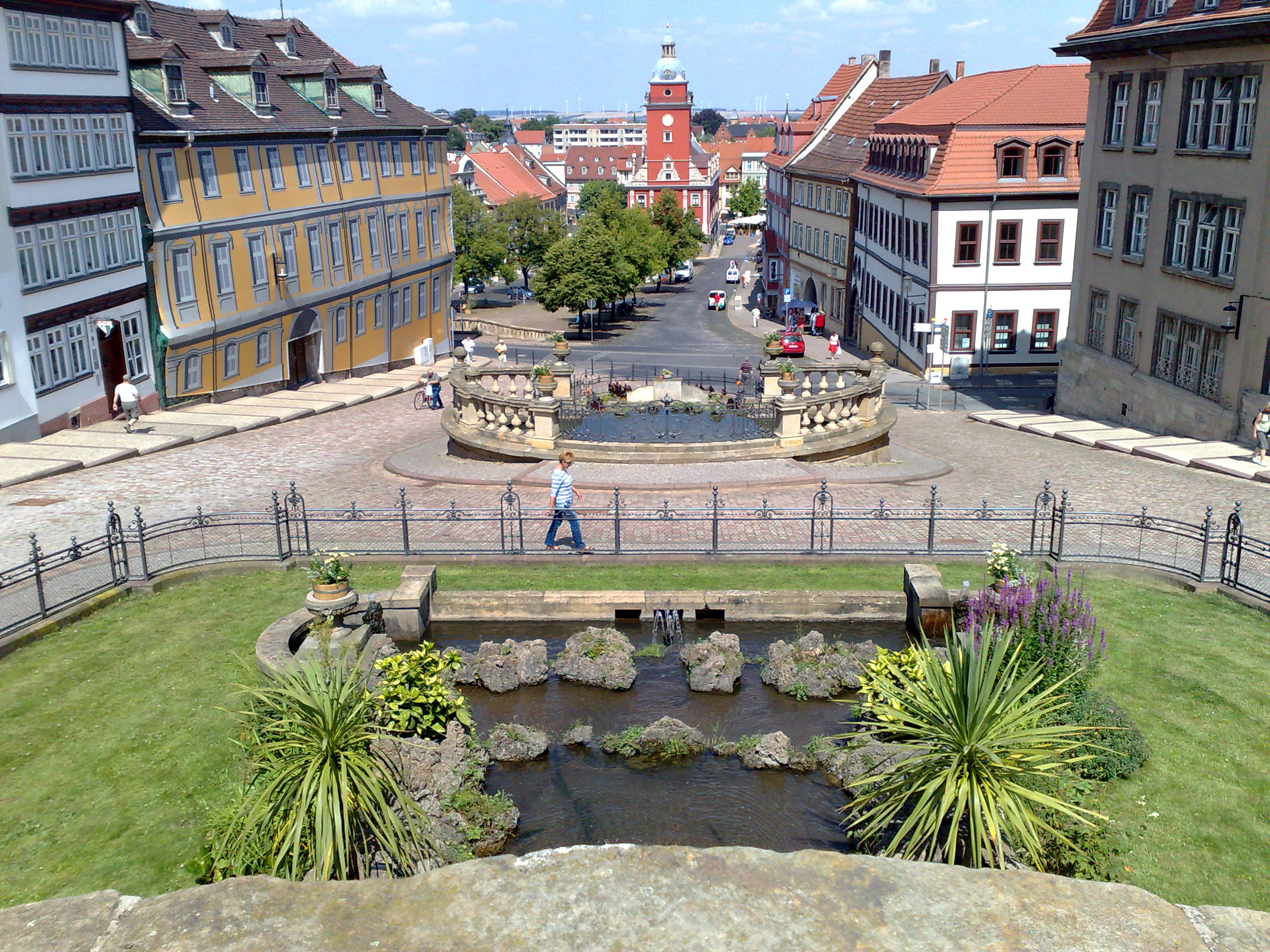
Wasserkunst

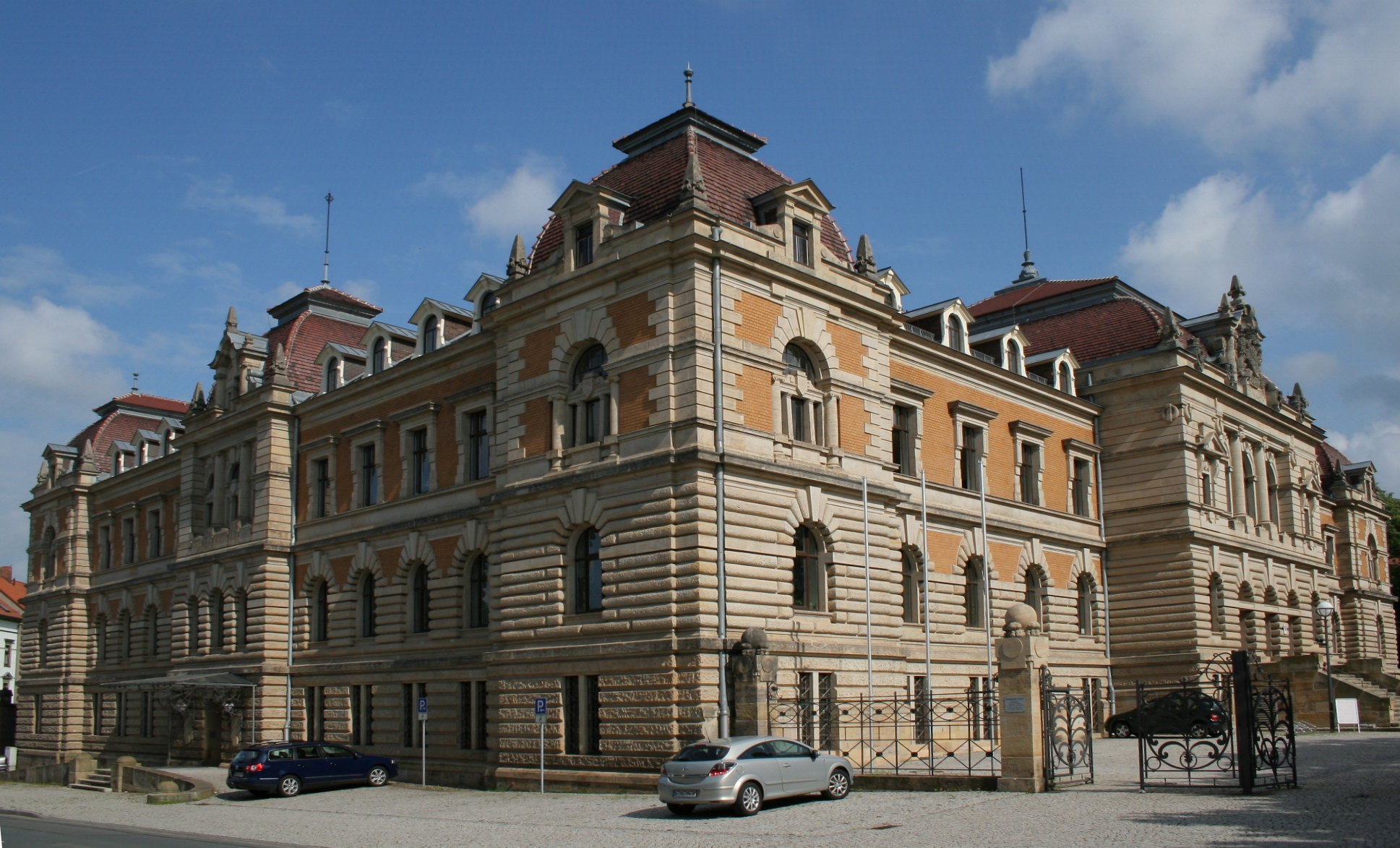
Courthouse

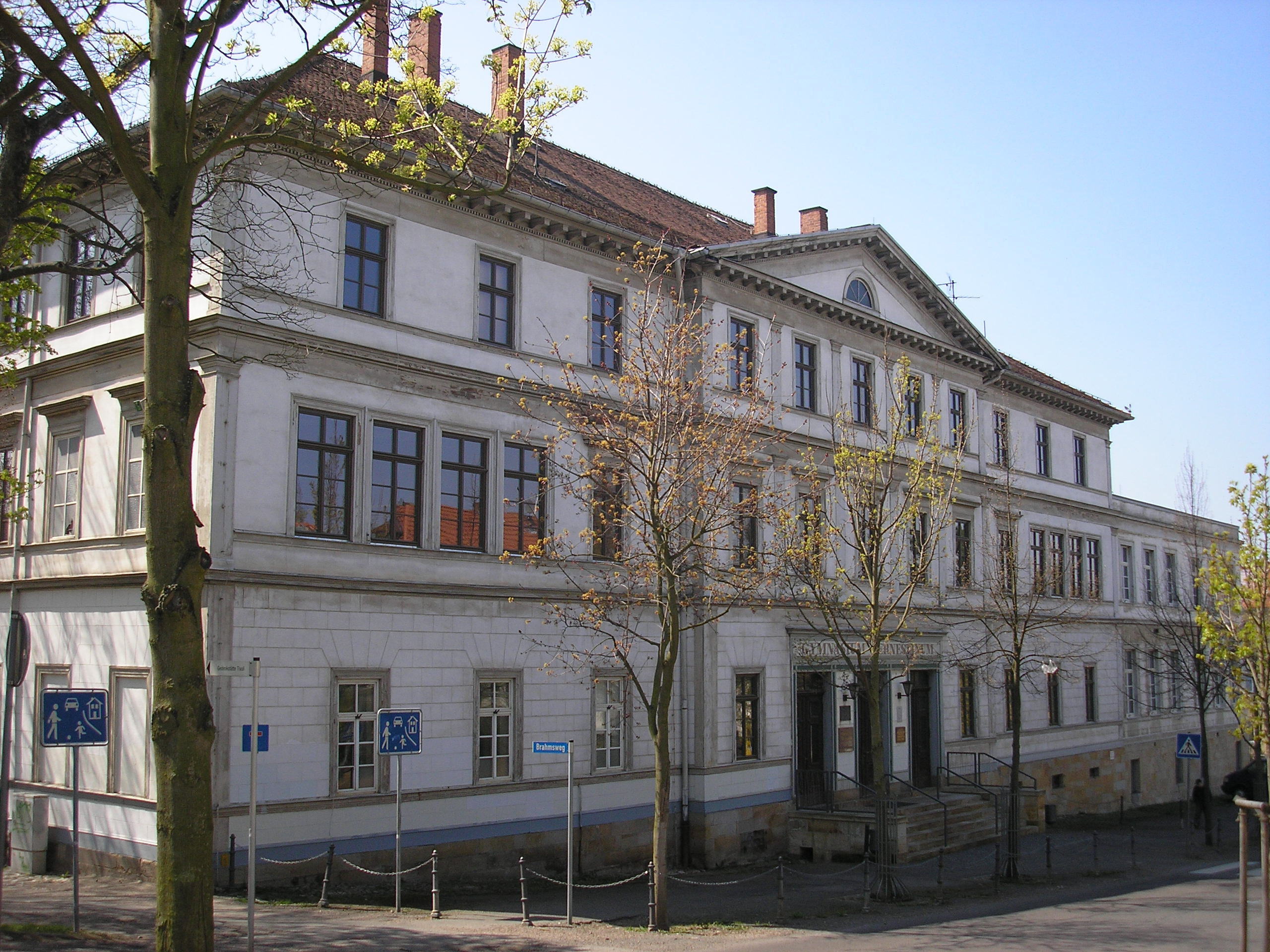
Ernestium school

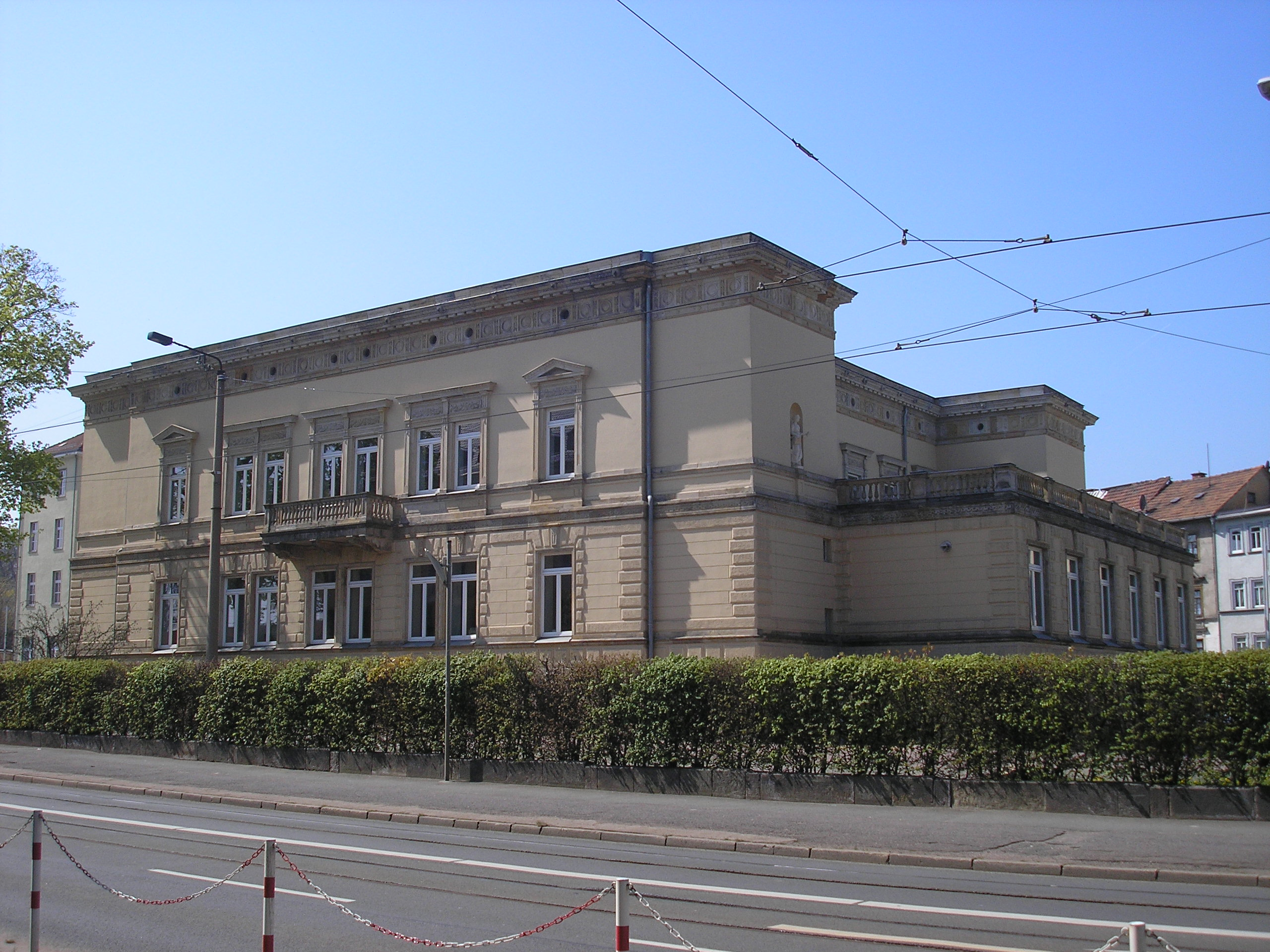
Gothaer Privatbank

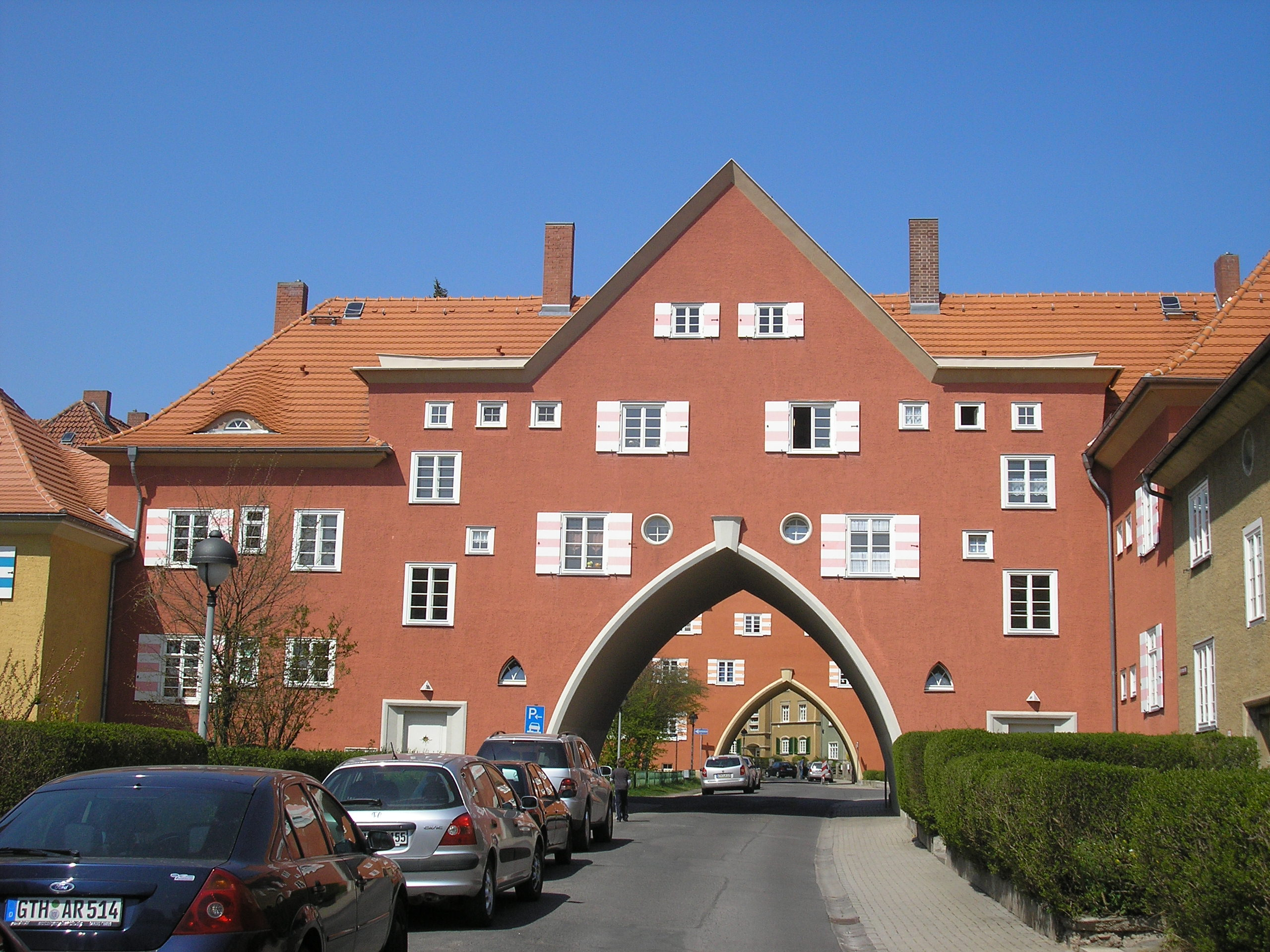
Garden city Am Schmalen Rain

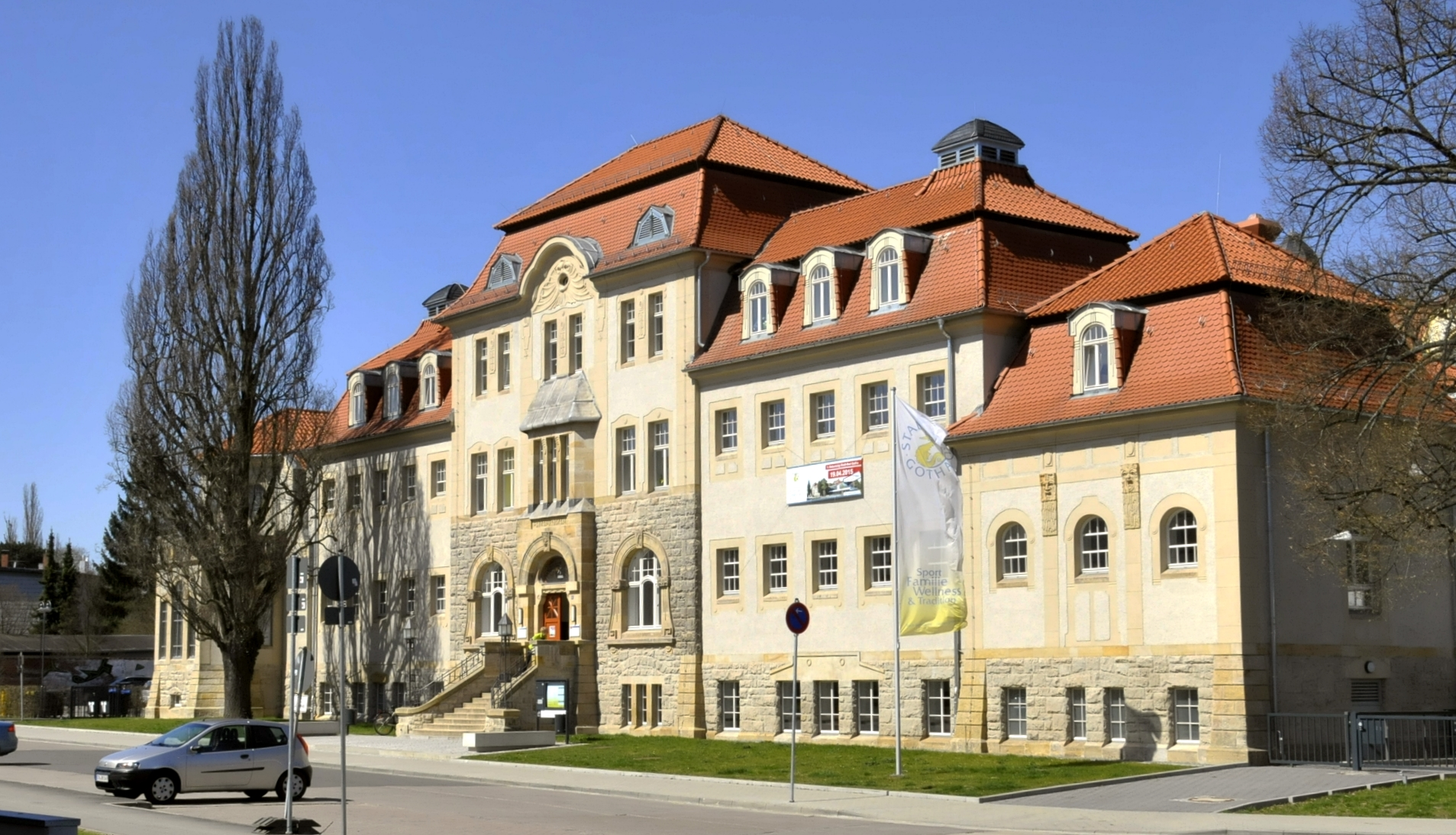
Stadtbad Gotha

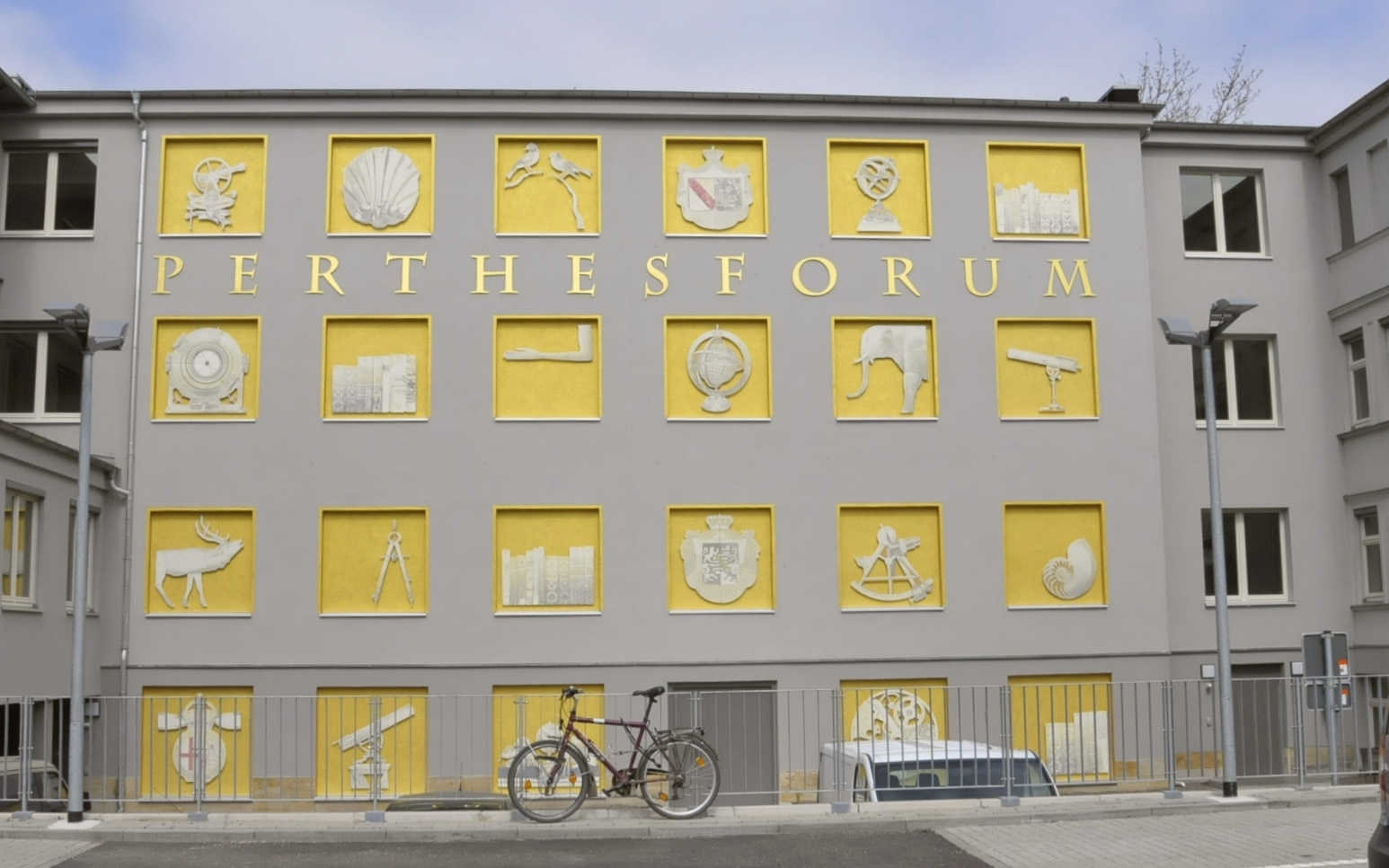
Perthesforum

== Economy and infrastructure ==
During recent years, the economic situation of the city improved: the unemployment rate in the district declined from 17% in 2005 to 7% in 2013 with rates a bit higher in the city itself than in the other municipalities of the Gotha district.

=== Agriculture, industry and services ===
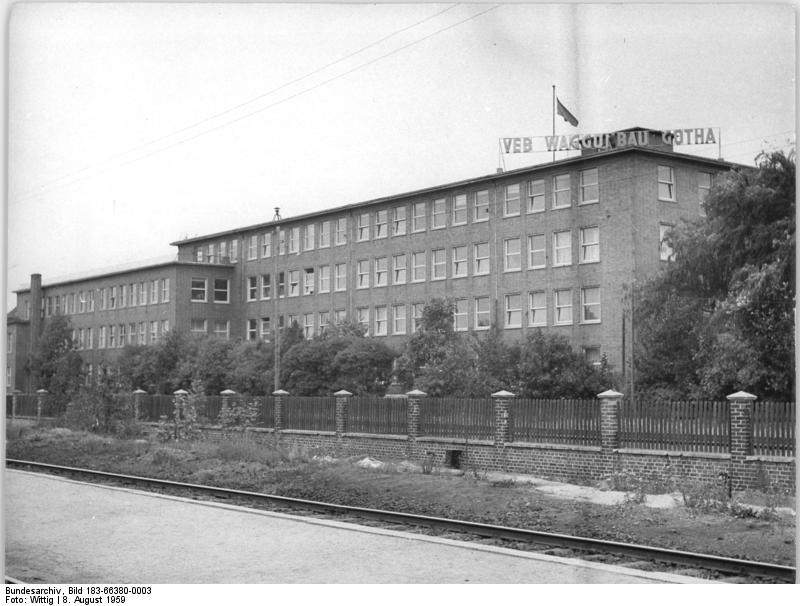
The Gothaer Waggonfabrik in 1959

Agriculture is still important in the region around Gotha with its fertile soil. More than 60% of the municipal territory is in agricultural use for growing maize, crops, vegetables and sugar beets.

Vehicle construction is still the most important industry in Gotha. The well-known Gothaer Waggonfabrik had two successors after 1990: the Gothaer Fahrzeugwerke, a Schmitz Cargobull factory with 800 workers and the Gothaer Fahrzeugtechnik, a crane manufacturer with 400 employees. The brewery belongs to the Paulaner Brewery and has 300 employees. In 2012, there were 28 companies with more than 20 workers in the industrial sector, employing 3,300 people and generating a turnover of more than €850 million. The old industrial district is situated in the east of Gotha, a new one developed after 1990 in the south. Further, the neighbouring small towns of Waltershausen and Ohrdruf have strong industrial cores, where many commuters from Gotha have found work.

As a former state capital (until 1920) and then district capital, Gotha is also a hub of public and private services. The city centre hosts some retailing and at the south-western periphery the largest hospital of the region was built after reunification. The Friedenstein barracks are one of the largest Bundeswehr bases in Thuringia. In addition, the Thüringisches Staatsarchiv Gotha, a state historical archive, and the Land's Financial Court have their seat in Gotha. Despite the various sights and the colourful history, tourism plays no important role in Gotha yet. In 2012, there were only 68,000 overnight guests staying for 154,000 nights in Gotha (compared to 310,000 in Eisenach, 650,000 in Weimar and 750,000 in Erfurt). Within the last decade there was no significant growth in tourism.

=== Transport ===
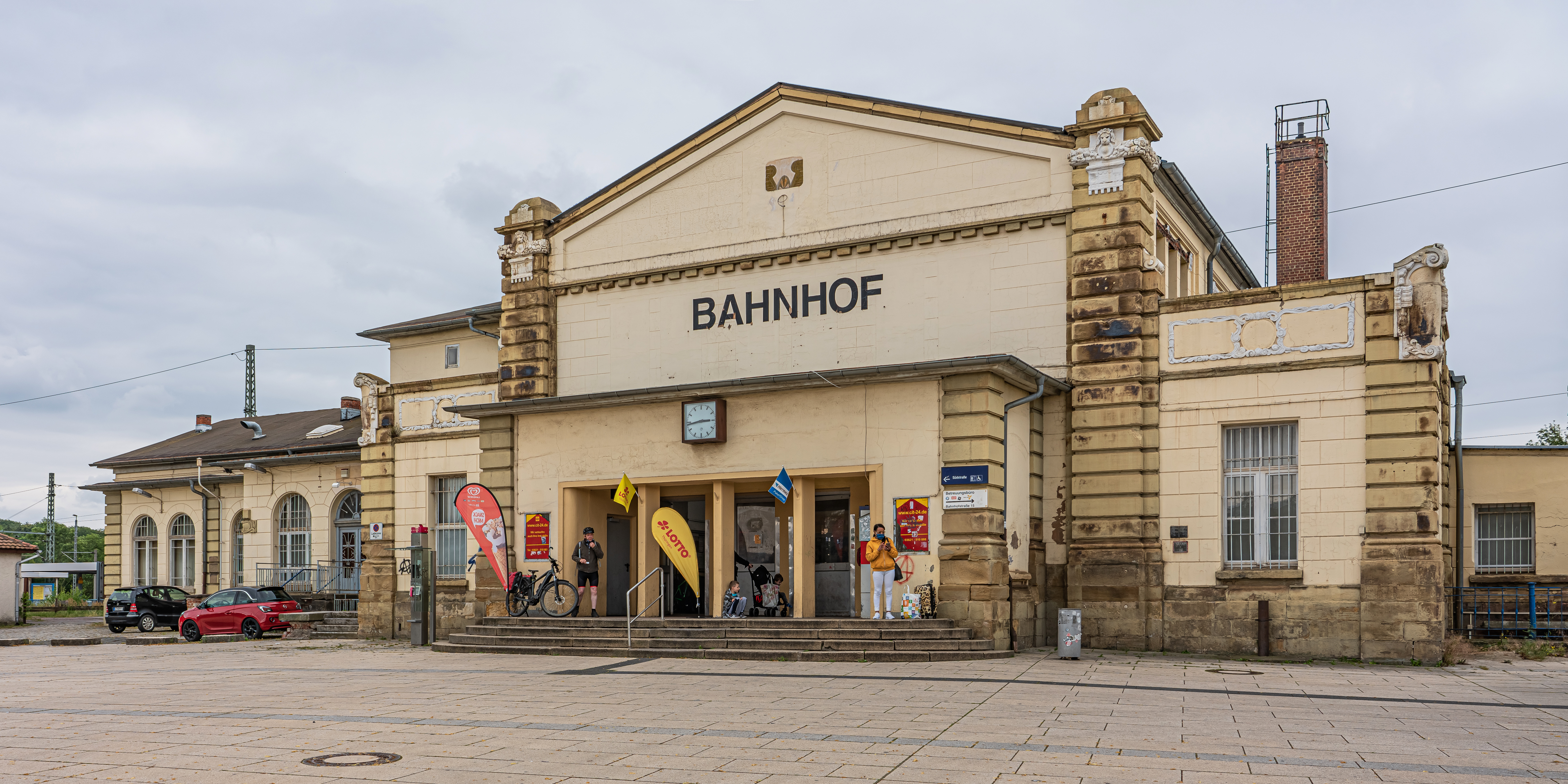
Gotha station (half rebuilt after 1945 bombings)

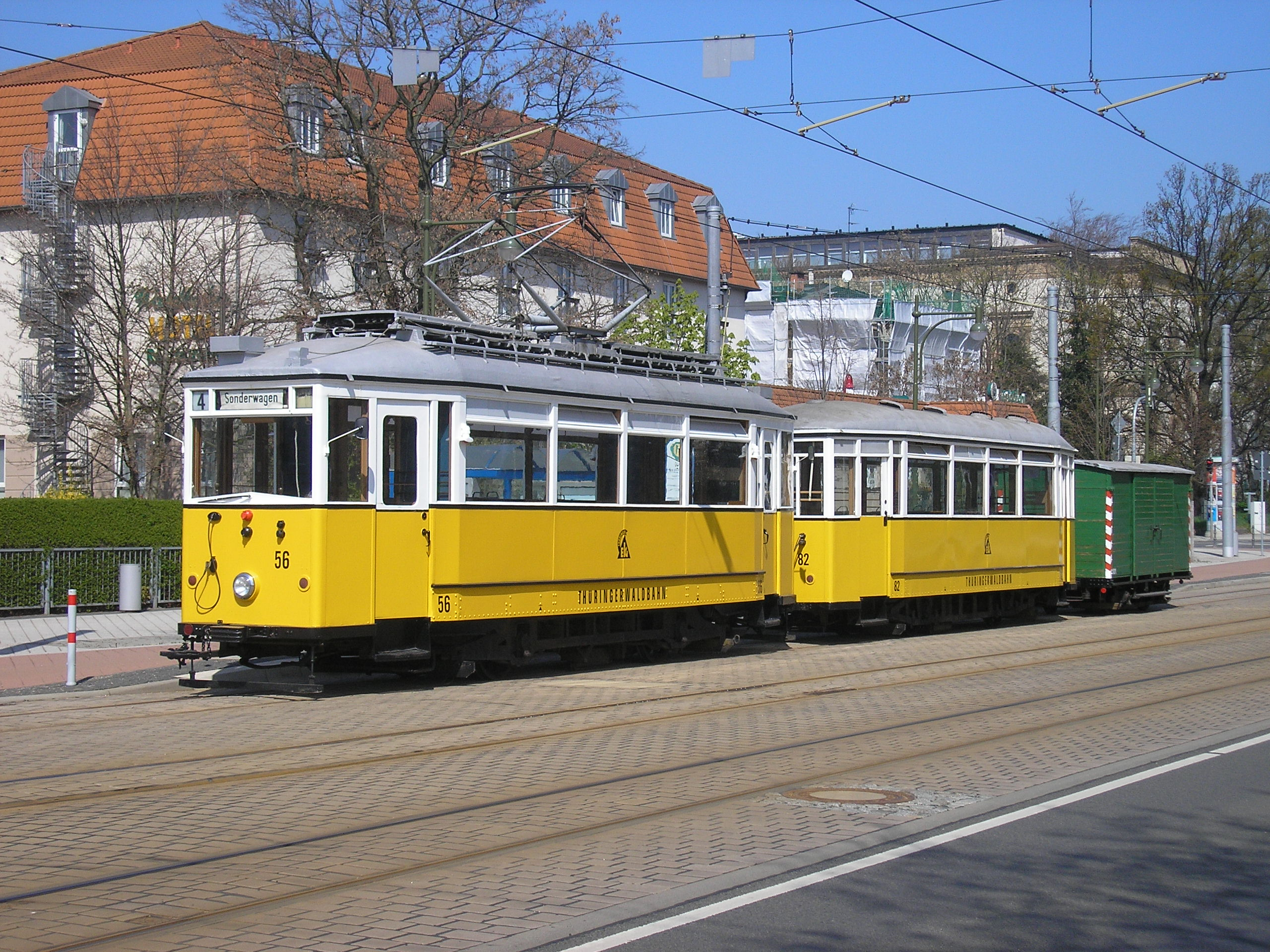
The historic tram of Thüringerwaldbahn

Gotha is connected by the Thuringian Railway to Erfurt and Leipzig in the east and to Frankfurt/Kassel in the west. Furthermore, there are some regional railways from Gotha to Leinefelde (via Mühlhausen) and to Gräfenroda (the latter out of service since 2011). Besides the main Gotha station, there is another one on the Gotha–Leinefelde railway: Gotha Ost in the north-eastern part of the city. Long-distance trains (ICE or IC) connect Gotha with Frankfurt in the west and Leipzig/Dresden in the east every two hours, as does a regional express train to Göttingen in the north-west and Zwickau/Glauchau in the east via Erfurt and Jena. The local trains to Eisenach in the west, Halle in the east (via Erfurt and Weimar) and Bad Langensalza in the north depart once an hour.

The two Autobahnen crossing nearby at Erfurter Kreuz are the Bundesautobahn 4 (Frankfurt–Dresden) and the Bundesautobahn 71 (Schweinfurt–Sangerhausen). Furthermore, there are two Bundesstraßen connecting Gotha: the Bundesstraße 7 from Eisenach in the west to Erfurt in the east and the Bundesstraße 247 from Ohrdruf in the south to Mühlhausen in the north. Important secondary roads lead from Gotha to Bad Tennstedt in the north-east, to Arnstadt in the south-east, to Waltershausen in the south-west and to Goldbach in the north-west. An eastern bypass road to relieve the city centre of transit traffic along B 247 is in the planning process.

The Erfurt-Weimar Airport is situated 20 kilometres east of Gotha and in use for holiday flights to southern European tourist destinations. The next major airport is Frankfurt Airport, approximately 250 km (155 mi) to the south-west.

Biking is becoming more and more popular since the construction of quality cycle tracks began in the 1990s. For tourists there is the long-distance Radweg Thüringer Städtekette (Thuringian city string trail). It connects points of touristic interest along the medieval Via Regia from Eisenach via Gotha, Erfurt, Weimar and Jena to Altenburg.

The public transport system consists of a tram network with three lines, connecting the city centre with the main station in the south-east, the east station in the north-east and the hospital in Sundhausen district in the south-west. A peculiarity is the 22 km (14 mi) long Thüringerwaldbahn (established in 1929), one of Germany's last traditional interurban tramway lines, to Bad Tabarz, Waltershausen and Friedrichroda. It is used both for everyday traffic and by tourists. Buses serve urban quarters and nearby villages lacking a tram or rail connection.

=== Education and research ===
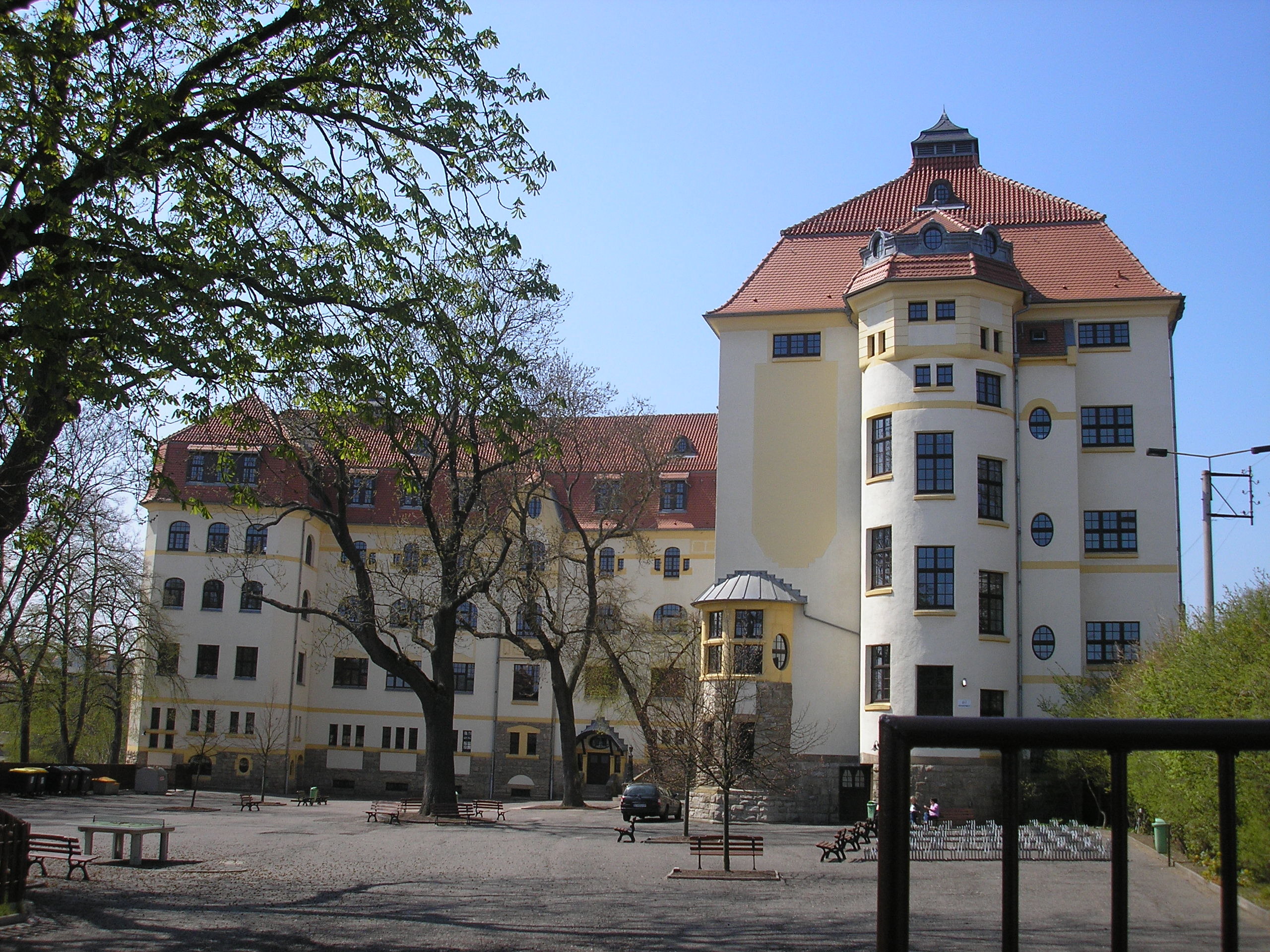
The Arnoldi school, one of the three Gymnasiums

There are three state-run Gymnasiums in Gotha, including the famous Ernestine Gymnasium. In addition, the Thüringer Fachhochschule für öffentliche Verwaltung (school of public administration) with 500 students has its seat in Gotha, as has the school of Thuringia's ministry of finance and the school of Thuringia's geodesy authority.

Research with focus on early modern history is carried out by the Forschungsbibliothek Gotha, the state archive and the "Friedenstein Foundation", which also runs the museums at Friedenstein Castle.

== Politics ==
=== Mayor and city council ===
The most recent mayoral election was held on 26 May 2024, with a runoff held on 9 June, and the results were as follows:

Candidate	Party	First round		Second round	
Candidate	Party	Votes	%	Votes	%
Knut Kreuch	Social Democratic Party	9,456	49.5	11,481	62.9
Robert Luhn	Christian Democratic Union	4,023	21.0	6,769	37.1
Jens Fiedler	Alternative for Germany	3,900	20.4		
Klaus Schmitz-Gielsdorf	The Left	1,004	5.3		
Nicole Schmidt	Independent	729	3.8		
Valid votes		19,112	99.1	18,250	96.7
Invalid votes		170	0.9	628	3.3
Total		19,282	100.0	18,878	100.0
Electorate/voter turnout		36,236	53.2	36,166	52.2
Source: 1st round, 2nd round

The most recent city council election was held on 26 May 2024, and the results were as follows:

Party	Lead candidate	Votes	%	+/-	Seats	+/-
Social Democratic Party (SPD)	Matthias Hey	18,683	33.9	▲3.4	12	▲1
Alternative for Germany (AfD)	Jens Fiedler	13,456	24.4	▲6.5	9	▲3
Christian Democratic Union (CDU)	Maximilian Fliedner	9,678	17.6	▲0.6	6	0
Sahra Wagenknecht Alliance (BSW)	Margot Vera Fitzke	4,682	8.5	New	3	New
Free Voters/Pirate Party (FWG–Piraten)	Juliane Pürstinger	3,785	6.9	▼4.4	3	▼1
Alliance 90/The Greens (Grüne)	Felix Kalbe	1,947	3.5	▼3.4	1	▼2
The Left (Die Linke)	Sebastian Vogt	1,866	3.4	▼9.5	1	▼4
Free Democratic Party (FDP)	Steffi Ziegenbalg	949	1.7	▼1.8	1	0
Valid votes		55,046	100.0			
Invalid ballots		598	3.1			
Total ballots		19,229	96.9		36	±0
Electorate/voter turnout		36,236	53.1	▲5.0		
Source: Wahlen in Thüringen

== Twin towns – sister cities ==
Gotha is twinned with:

- Adwa, Ethiopia
- Gastonia, United States
- Kielce, Poland
- Martin, Slovakia
- Romilly-sur-Seine, France
- Salzgitter, Germany

== Notable people ==
- See the List of people associated with the town (German Wikipedia)
