= Kraner =

Kraner is a surname. Notable people with the surname include:

- Doug Kraner (died 2016), American production designer
- Friedrich Kraner (1812–1863), German schoolteacher and classical philologist
- Cissy Kraner (1918–2012), Austrian actress

== See also ==
- Kramer (surname)
