= Wilhelm Dittenberger =

German classical philologist and epigrapher (1840–1906)

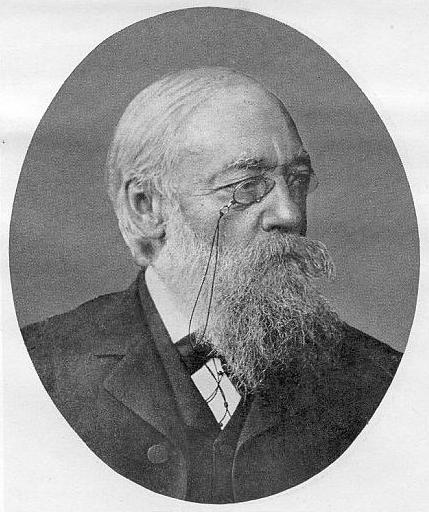
- Born: August 31, 1840; Heidelberg
- Died: December 29, 1906 (aged 66); Halle (Saale)

Wilhelm (William) Dittenberger (August 31, 1840 in Heidelberg – December 29, 1906 in Halle (Saale)) was a German philologist in classical epigraphy.

== Life ==
Wilhelm Dittenberger was the son of the Protestant theologian Wilhelm Theophor Dittenberger. After attending school in Heidelberg and Weimar (then directed by Hermann Sauppe), he studied classical philology at Jena from 1859 and transferred to Göttingen in 1861, where he was reunited with Hermann Sauppe and received his doctorate at the beginning of 1863 for a work on the Athenian ephebes. From autumn of that year, he taught at the Göttingen Gymnasium while he completed his habilitation on Sallust at the University of Göttingen. Initially, Dittenberger remained a schoolteacher, becoming a teacher at the Joachimsthalsches Gymnasium in Berlin in 1865, at the Rudolstadt Gymnasium from 1867, and at the gymnasium in Quedlinburg from 1873 to 1874. In 1874 he was appointed Professor of Classical Philology at the University of Halle. He was a corresponding member of the Prussian Academy of Sciences and an ordinary member of the German Archaeological Institute.

Dittenberger's research focus was Greek epigraphy. His name is associated above all with the edited collections Sylloge Inscriptionum Graecarum (later re-edited by Friedrich Hiller von Gaertringen) and Orientis Graeci Inscriptiones Selectae. For Inscriptiones Graecae, Dittenberger was responsible for the Athenian inscriptions of the Roman period, of Megaris and Boeotia, and of Phocis, Lokris, Aetolia, Acarnania and the Ionian Islands. In addition he edited the inscriptions of Olympia (with Karl Purgold) and the 6th to 11th editions of the widely used commentary on Julius Caesar's De Bello Gallico begun by Friedrich Kraner.

His son, Heinrich Dittenberger (1875–1952), was a lawyer in Halle, Leipzig, and Berlin, as well as Chief Director of the German Bar Association from 1910 to 1933.

After his death in 1907, his library was acquired by the University of Illinois at Urbana-Champaign, as was the library of Johannes Vahlen, slightly later (1913). Together, the two libraries form the Dittenberger-Vahlen Collection of Classical Texts, containing over 15,000 books and 17,000 reprints. In 2000, the university began the digitisation of this collection with the assistance of the National Endowment for the Humanities.

Dittenberger's tomb is located in the Nordfriedhof in Halle.

== Writings ==
- Inscriptions Graecae
  - Vol 3: Inscriptions Atticae Aetatis Romanae. 2 parts. Reimer, Berlin 1878–1882. Reprint 1977–1978, ISBN 3-11-004911-2, ISBN 3-11-007004-9.
  - Vol 7: Inscriptions Megaridis et Boeotiae. Reimer, Berlin 1892 Reprint 1978, ISBN 3-11-007005-7.
  - Vol 9, 1: Inscriptions Phocidis, Locridis, Aetoliae, Acarnaniae, Insularum maris Ionii. Reimer, Berlin 1897, reprinted 1978, ISBN 3-11-007006-5.
- Sylloge Inscriptionum Graecarum. 2 vols. Leipzig 1883.
- Orientis Graeci inscriptiones selectae (OGIS) 2 vols. Leipzig, 1903–1905. Reprint Olms, Hildesheim, 1986, ISBN 3-487-00028-8, ISBN 3-487-00029-6 .
- Wilfried Gawantka: Updating Concordances to Dittenberger's Orientis Graeci Inscriptiones Selectae (OGIS) and the third edition of which he authored: Sylloge Inscriptionum Graecarum (3rd ed.) . Hildesheim (1977) ISBN 3-487-06447-2
- Lisa Sophie Cordes, Hans-Ulrich Berner, "Dittenberger, Wilhelm." In: Der Neue Pauly (DNP). Supplementband 6: Geschichte der Altertumswissenschaften. Metzler, Stuttgart 2012, ISBN 978-3-476-02033-8, Sp. 310f.

== Literature about Dittenberger ==
- Otto Kern, "Wilhelm Dittenberger and images of central German life. third generation images of the 18th and 19th Century. Article for the Historical Commission for the Province of Saxony." Self-published: Magdeburg, 1928, pp. 522–538.
- Hans-Dieter Zimmermann, "Wilhelm Dittenberger (1840–1906). On 100th year to the death of an important scholar and dedicated local politician." Yearbook for Halle City History 2006. Stekovics: Halle 2006, pp. 264–269, ISBN 978-3-89923-133-5.
