= Schlosspark Gotha =

Park and gardens originally attached to the Schloss Friedenstein in Gotha, Germany

Coordinates: 50.943309°N 10.705421°E

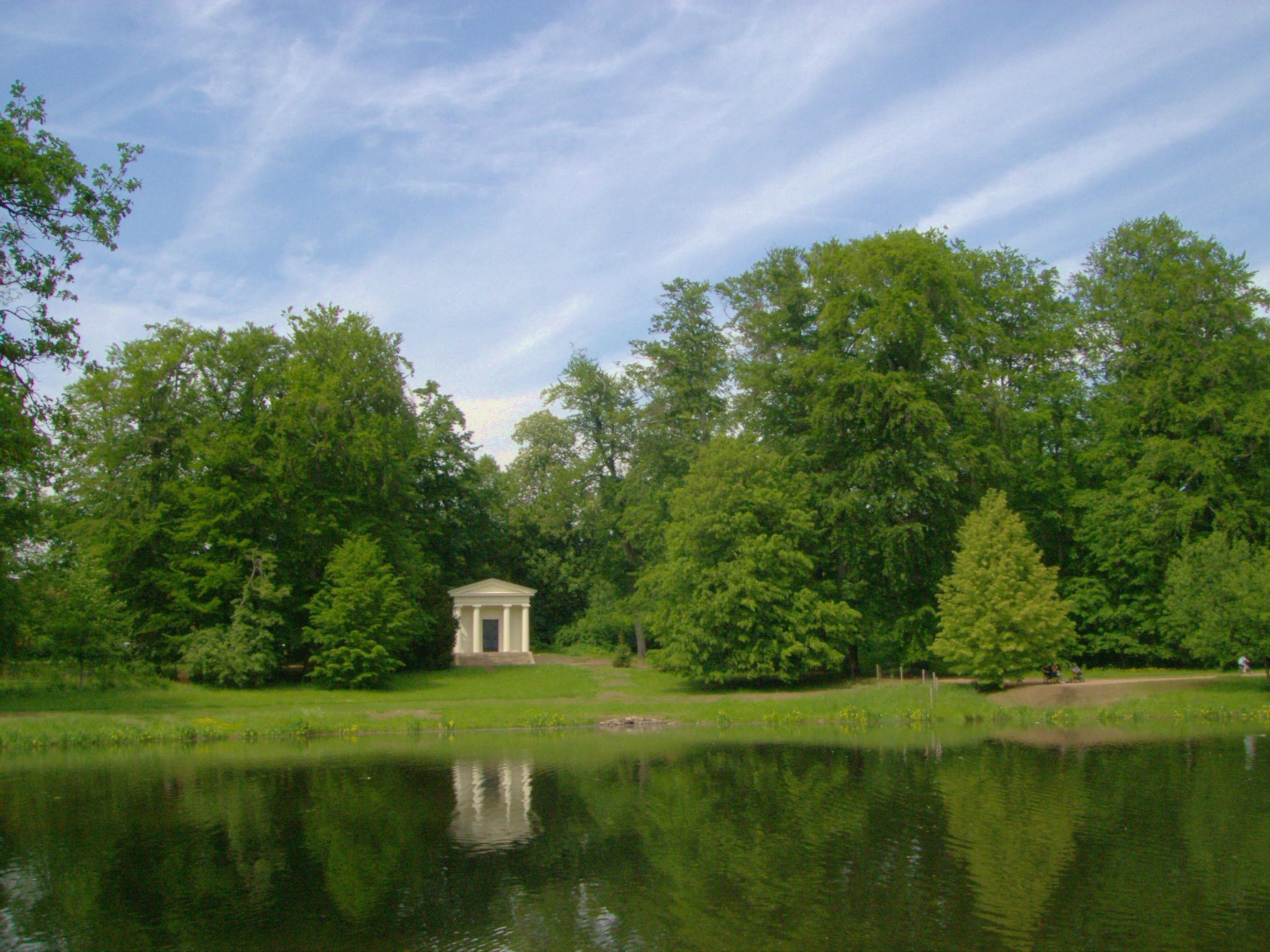
The Doric Temple of Mercury and the Großer Parkteich (Large Park Lake).

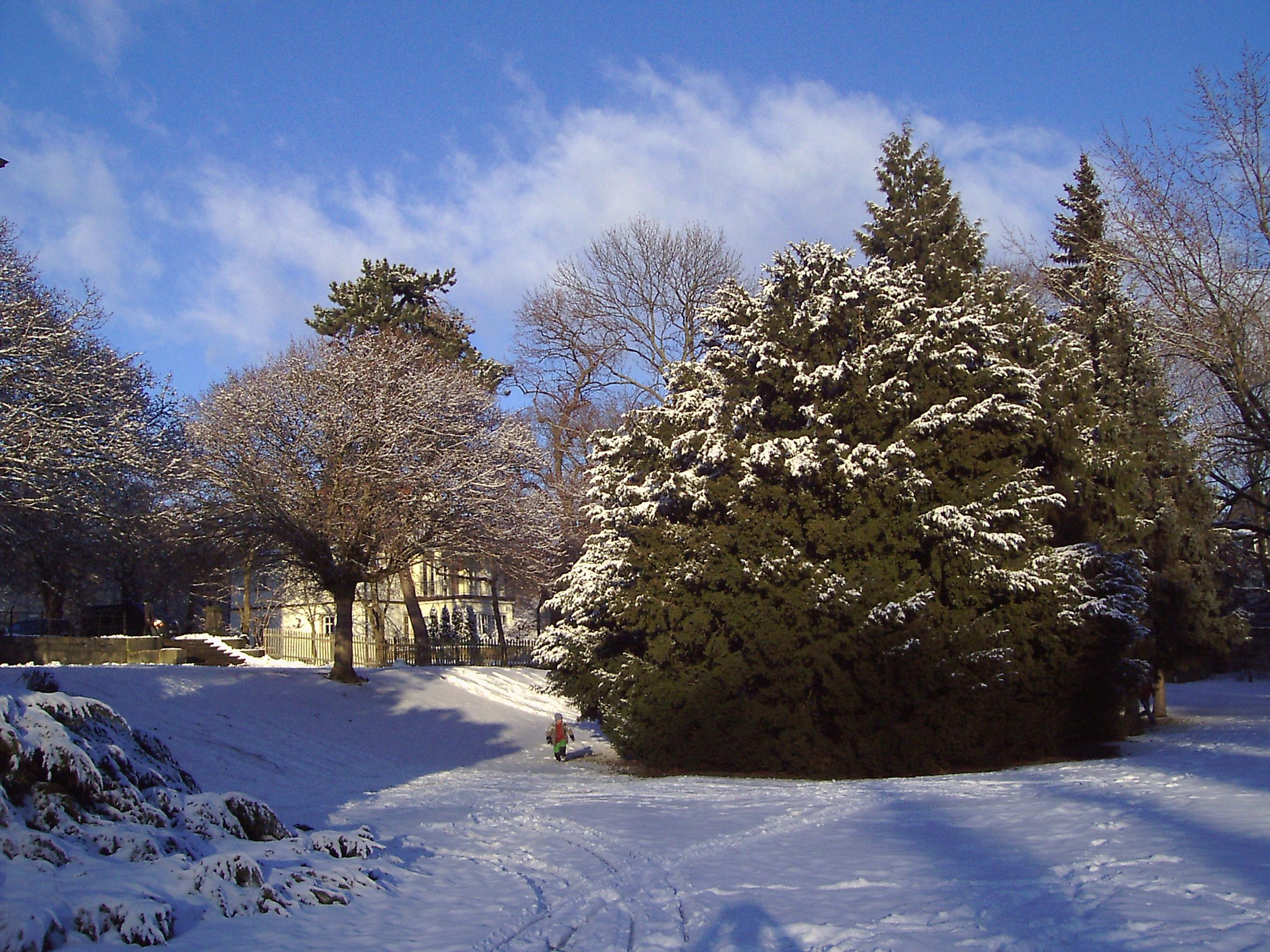
Fir Garden in winter.

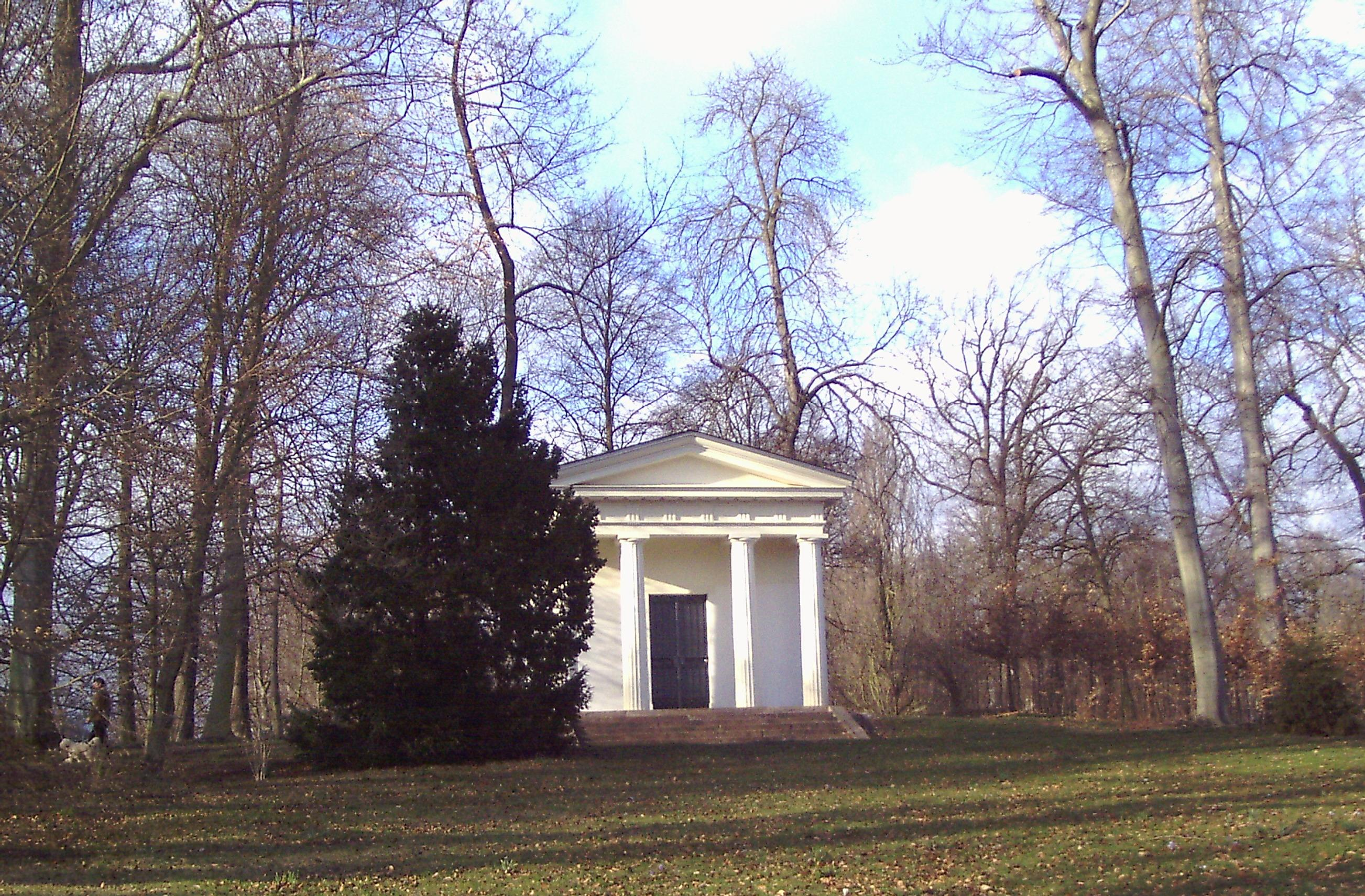
The Temple of Mercury.

The Schlosspark Gotha is the park and gardens originally attached to the Schloss Friedenstein in the German city of Gotha. It covers 37 hectares, making it one of the country's largest parks. To the Schloss' south is one of the oldest landscape gardens outside the United Kingdom, first designed in 1765.

Whilst a guest of Prince August of Saxe-Gotha-Altenburg between 1775 and 1801, the poet and writer Goethe was a frequent visitor to the park. The Schlosspark was voted the fourth most beautiful park in central Germany by Mitteldeutscher Rundfunk listeners. The English Garden in particular is noted for its old trees, including 500-year-old oaks. The park's overall history was explored in the temporary exhibition "Gotha – im Reich der Göttin Freiheit" at the Museum of Nature Gotha in 2007 during the Gotha Garden Summer festival held that year.

== History ==
=== Walled and kitchen gardens ===
The Schloss and its 'Schlosswallgarten' (Palace Walled Garden) were first built by Duke Ernest I (the Pious) of Saxe-Gotha-Altenburg in 1643–1648. The latter was intended to supply the ducal kitchen as well as provide recreation space for the duke and his family

The so-called castle wall garden, which was created at that time, served to supply the ducal kitchen and for the recreation of the ducal family. It was rectangular and provided space for numerous potted plants at the north end, whilst at the south end herb beds were laid out, separated from each other by hedges of currants, roses and gooseberries. The flower beds contained lilies, daffodils, hyacinths, crocuses, irises, hemerocallis and tulips and served as a status symbol for the duke. This garden existed until around 1772 and was transformed when the city of Gotha was dismantled.

The Großen Küchengarten (Great Kitchen Garden) was also built by Ernest I in the area between what is now Park-Allee and the Leinakanal which in the 14th century had been built to link Schönau and Gotha and supply the water-poor latter city with water from the Thuringian forests. This garden contained citrus plants in pots, with the chief gardener housed to the south in the Pomeranzenhaus, and survived until 1864, when the Ducal Museum began to be built on part of its site, with the rest soon afterwards covered by the Tannengarten (Fir Garden).

=== Baroque Garden ===
A Barockgarten (Baroque Garden) was added in 1708–1711 on the construction of the Schloss Friedrichsthal by Frederick II, Duke of Saxe-Gotha-Altenburg to the east, outside the former ramparts of the city. It consisted of decorative flowerbeds, topiary and hedges. The main axis was laid out in a west–east direction and ended in the so-called Ehrenhof (courtyard of honor). In the centre was a large fountain. The park's borders consisted of several rows of tree-lined avenues. From the last decade of the 19th century, the Baroque garden was built over with government buildings (the Ducal District and Regional Court in 1894–1896, followed by the Ducal Revenue Office in 1906–1908).

== Bibliography (in German) ==
- Elisabeth Dobritzsch (ed.): Im Reich der Göttin Freiheit. Gothas fürstliche Gärten in 5 Jahrhunderten (= Gothaisches Museums-Jahrbuch. 11, 2008). Hain, Weimar 2007, ISBN 978-3-89807-106-2.
- Michael Niedermeier: Vorhöfe, Tempel und Heiligstes. Der Herzoglich Englische Garten – Entstehung und Bedeutung. In: Werner Greiling (Hrsg.): Ernst II. von Sachsen-Gotha-Altenburg. Ein Herrscher im Zeitalter der Aufklärung (= Veröffentlichungen der Historischen Kommission für Thüringen. Kleine Reihe. Bd. 15). Böhlau, Köln u. a. 2005, ISBN 3-412-19905-2, S. 185–199.
- Michael Niedermeier: Der Herzogliche Englische Garten in Gotha und das Geheimbundwesen. In: Helmut Reinalter u. Institut für Ideengeschichte und der Wissenschaftlichen Kommission zur Erforschung der Freimaurerei: Freimaurerische Kunst – Kunst der Freimaurerei. Studien-Verlag, Innsbruck, Wien, München, Bozen 2005, ISBN 978-3-7065-4115-2, S. 127–151.
- Rainer Samietz, Frieder Gröger (Red.): Der Gothaer Park. Seine Geschichte und Natur. Museum der Natur Gotha, Gotha 1993.
- Richard Waitz: Der herzogliche Park zu Gotha von seiner Entstehung bis auf die jetzige Zeit. Stollberg, Gotha 1849, Digitalisat.
- Matthias Wenzel: Gothaer Denkmäler und Gedenksteine. Sutton, Erfurt 2004, ISBN 3-89702-742-9.
