= Gustav Schenk zu Schweinsberg =

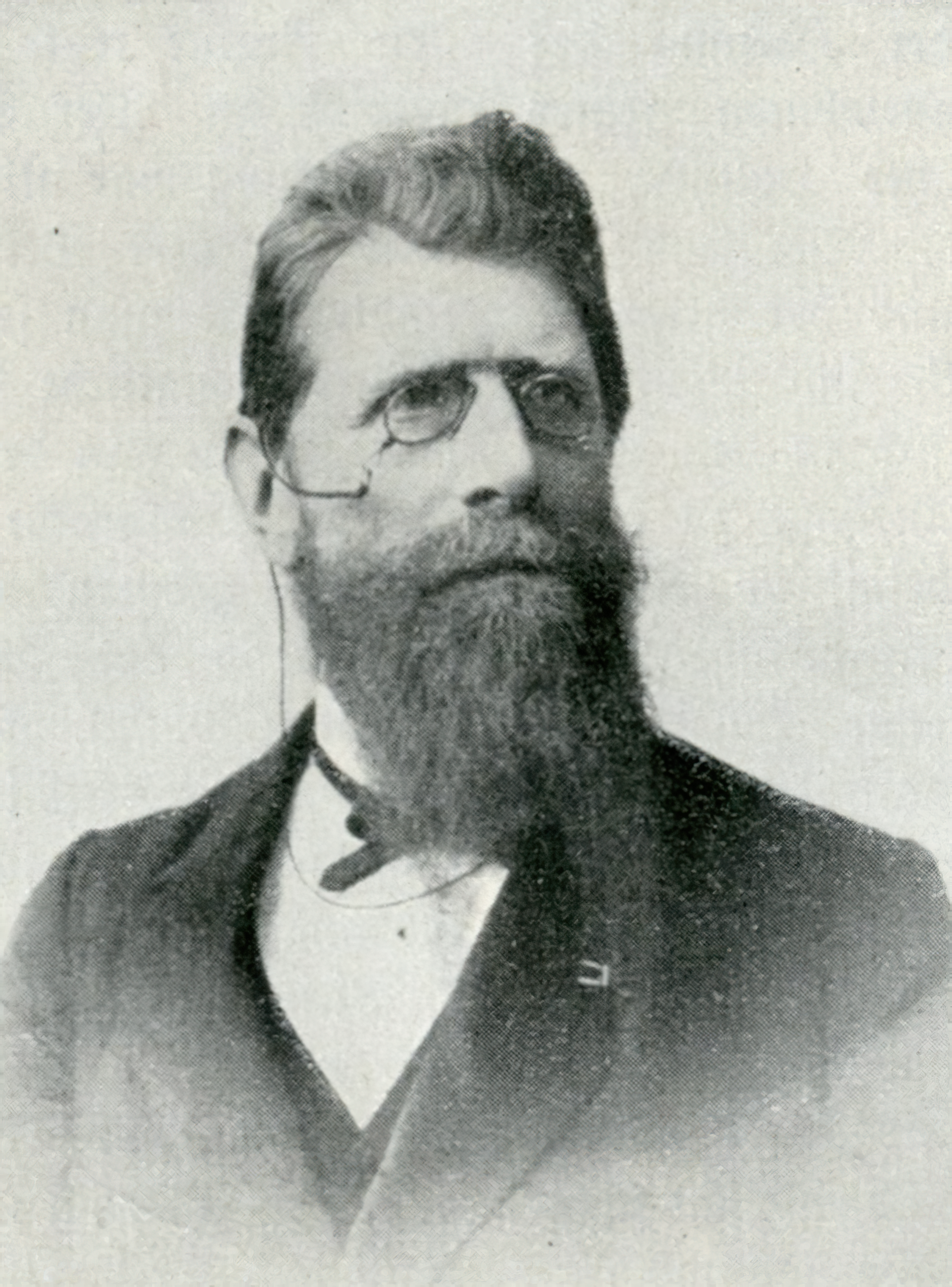
Gustav Schenk zu Schweinsberg

Gustav Ferdinand Carl Johann Ernst Ludwig Freiherr von Schenk zu Schweinsberg (16 September 1842 - 25 July 1922) was a German minor nobleman, regional historian (specialising in the history of the Grand Duchy of Hesse) and archivist. He belonged to the Hermannstein line of the Schenk zu Schweinsberg noble family.

== Life ==
The coat of arms designed in 1902.

He was born in Kassel to First Lieutenant (later Royal-Prussian Major General) Karl Wilhelm Ludwig Freiherr von Schenk zu Schweinsberg (died 5 October 1877, Kassel) and his wife Tusnelda von Eschwege (died 1886). One of his father's brothers was Ludwig Johann Schenck zu Schweinsberg.

After preschool in Kassel, he attended the Hohe Landesschule in Hanau. He then became a cadet in the Hessian army at Kassel, serving from 1860 in the Leibgarde-Regiment. After Hesse was defeated in the Austro-Prussian War in 1866, he renounced an offer to transfer to the Prussian Army and instead began studying law and history at the University of Giessen. These studies were interrupted by the Franco-Prussian War of 1870, during which he was an officer in the 1. Großherzoglich Hessischen Leibgarde-Regiment and was wounded at the Battle of Gravelotte.

After the war he returned to his studies and graduated as a doctor of law in 1873 and a doctor of philology. He remained in Giessen as a Regierungsakzessist in Hesse's civil service, before moving to the Duchy's state archive at Darmstadt in the same position in 1875. In 1876 he became secretary to the Grand Duchy of Hesse Historical Society, becoming its Chaiman in 1890. He was made chairman of the archives in 1877, with the job title 'Haus- und Staatsarchivar', and in 1886 its director. In the meantime, in 1879, Louis IV, Grand Duke of Hesse made him his chamberlain. In 1902 he designed a new coat of arms for Hesse.

He also served from 1907 to 1911 as a state member of the Grand Duchy of Hesse Historical Commission. He was a member of the Grand Duchy's first-ever 'Denkmalrat' (Monuments Commission), formed by Hesse's 1902 Monument Protection Act, Germany's first-ever modern law for the protection of historic monuments. He retired from his archives post at his own request in 1911 and died eleven years later in Fronhausen.

== Marriage and issue ==
Gustav Schenk zu Schweinsberg married Emilie Anna Johanna Emma Ernestine von Grolman (born 11 June 1852 in Giessen), daughter of Ludwig von Grolman, a Hofgerichtsrat. With her he had:

- Gunthram Karl Ludwig Rudolf (born 21 May 1874)
- Johann Ludwig Reinhard (born 8 May 1878)
- Emma Thusnelda Anna Caroline Ida (born 4 February 1881)
- Elisabeth Auguste Charlotte Ada Ottilie Alice (born 7 March 1886)
- Eberhard Ferdinand Ludwig Reinhard Gunthram Johann (born 4 February 1893)

== Honours ==
- 1894 November 25 – Knight's Cross, 1st Class, Order of Philip the Magnanimous
- 1900 June 23 – Gold Medal of the Grand Duchy of Hesse for Science, Art, Industry and Agriculture
- 1902 November 25 – Cross of Honour, Order of Philip the Magnanimous
- 1904 December 21 – Court-Service Honorary Medal for 25 years' service
- 1911 August 26 – Geheimrat
- undated - infantry Oberstleutnant à la suite.

== Works by year of publication ==
- Das letzte Testament Landgraf Wilhelm II. von Hessen vom Jahre 1508 und seine Folgen. Ein Beitrag zur Geschichte Hessens während der Minderjährigkeit Landgraf Philipp des Großmütigen. Perthes, Gotha 1876.
- Beiträge zur Kenntnis der in Frankfurt begütert gewesenen Adelsfamilien = Neujahrsblatt den Mitgliedern des Vereins für Geschichte und Alterthumskunde zu Frankfurt a. M. 1878. Frankfurt 1878.
- Aus der Jugendzeit Landgraf Philipps des Großmütigen. In: Philipp Landgraf zu Hessen 1504–1904 = Festschrift des Historischen Vereins für das Großherzogtum Hessen, hg. von Julius Reinhard Dietrich und Bernhard Müller. Elwert, Marburg 1904, pages 73–143.
- Aus der Geschichte der Fronhäuser Burg 1367–1917. 1917.

== Bibliography ==
- (in German) Gothaisches genealogisches Taschenbuch der freiherrlichen Häuser, Vierundvierzigster Jahrgang, 1894, pages 795 ff.
- (in German) August Roeschen: Gustav Freiherr Schenk zu Schweinsberg †. In: Volk und Scholle 1, Heft 5–6 (1922), pages 145–147
- (in German) Ingeborg Schnack: Lebensbilder aus Kurhessen und Waldeck 1830–1930, 1958, page 350.
