= Karl Purgold =

Karl Purgold (28 December 1850, Gotha – 25 June 1939, Gotha) was a German classical archaeologist and museum director.

In 1878, he received his doctorate from the Ludwig-Maximilians-Universität München, where he was a student of Heinrich Brunn. Following graduation, he travelled the Mediterranean region by way of a grant from the German Archaeological Institute (1878–1880). From 1890 until his retirement in 1934, he was director of the Ducal Museum Gotha, only the second-ever holder of that post.

He took part in the excavations at Olympia, Greece, being tasked with providing analysis of ancient inscriptions. With Wilhelm Dittenberger, he edited Die inschriften von Olympia, based on the inscriptions found at Olympia.

== Selected works ==
- Archäologische Bemerkungen zu Claudian und Sidonius, 1878 – Archaeological observations on Claudian and Sidonius.
- Die inschriften von Olympia, edited by W. Dittenberger and K. Purgold; (The inscriptions of Olympia), volume V. of Olympia : Die Ergebnisse der von dem Deutschen Reich veranstalteten Ausgrabung (Olympia : The results of the excavation organized by the German Reich; 1890–97).
- Das Museum des Herzoglichen Hauses in Gotha, 1910.
- Das Herzogliche Museum, 1937 (with Eberhard Schenk zu Schweinsberg) – The Ducal Museum in Gotha.
