= Portrait of a Man in a Wide-Brimmed Hat (Hals; Gotha) =

Painting by Frans Hals

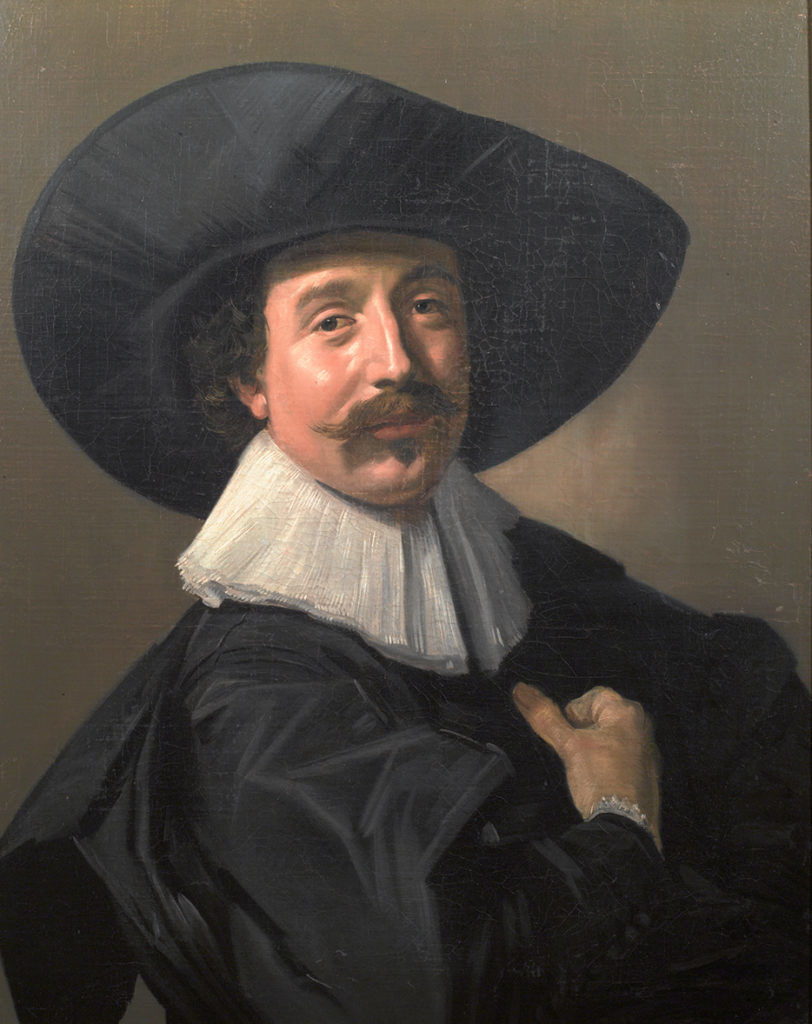
- Portrait of a Man in a Wide-Brimmed Hat photographed in 2019
- Artist: Frans Hals
- Year: About 1630
- Catalogue: Hofstede de Groot, Catalogue raisonné 1910: No. 278
- Medium: Oil on canvas
- Movement: 17th-century Dutch
- Dimensions: 64 cm × 52 cm (25 in × 20 in)
- Location: Herzogliches Museum, Gotha
- Owner: Friedenstein Stiftung Gotha
- Accession: SG 690
- Website: Official website

Portrait of a Man in a Wide-Brimmed Hat is a name used to identify an untitled painting that hangs in the Herzogliches Museum ("Ducal Museum"), part of the Friedenstein Palace complex at Gotha, Germany. Frans Hals, a 17th-century Dutch artist, painted it in about 1625–1635. It was stolen in 1979, recovered in 2019, and restored in 2020–2021.

== Description and context ==
The work is a half-length portrait of a middle-class man who looks about 30 years old. The sitter (whose identity is not now known) has a rather glassy complexion and regular features. His nose is straight, his cheeks are rosy, and he wears a moustache and "soul patch". He is turned three-quarters right and smiles at the viewer. He holds his right hand to his breast and leans towards us a little to catch our attention. He seems to rest his right elbow on the picture frame as if it were a windowsill, potentially crossing the boundary between his space and ours. The sitter wears a black doublet and a plain black silk cloak, a white falling collar of fine pleated linen, and a wide-brimmed black felt hat. The background is grey. From the viewer's perspective, the light falls from the left. The portrait is in oil on canvas glued to an oak panel from later than 1688. It is not signed or dated. Cornelis Hofstede de Groot notes its "broad and vigorous" style, while Katja Kleinert (curator of 17th-century Dutch and Flemish art at the Gemäldegalerie, Berlin) observes that it makes a remarkably dynamic impression for a portrait from its time.

In the period when the portrait was painted, black attire was popular among male professionals, ecclesiastics, and magistrates in the Netherlands (where commerce, the sciences, and the arts were flourishing). A big black hat signalled masculinity and self-assuredness. Black was chic, evoking seriousness, religiosity, and restrained sobriety, and Hals was renowned for his masterly handling of black clothes. As Vincent van Gogh enthused 250 years later in a letter to his brother Theo: "Frans Hals heeft wel zeven en twintig zwarten" (Frans Hals must have twenty-seven shades of black). The black cloak in particular is finished in the "rough" or "loose" style characteristic of Hals, seemingly dashed off at speed in broad, unblended brushstrokes. It lends his work vitality.

Like this sitter, some men wore a falling collar in the Netherlands in the late 1620s and early 1630s as an alternative to the physically and metaphorically stiff "millstone" ruff. Although high fashion at the time favoured an elaborate turned-back cuff to the shirt, this sitter's shirt has only modest lace trim at the wrist, of the kind typically worn by Mennonites.

Hofstede de Groot suggested the Portrait of a Man in a Wide-Brimmed Hat may be a self-portrait by Frans Hals, while Wilhelm Valentiner thought it possibly a pendant to the Portrait of a Seated Woman at Göteborg, Sweden (which is, however, now no longer attributed to Frans Hals).

In 1879, Heinrich Justus Schneider, the director of paintings and engravings at Gotha, made a watercolour of the picture gallery at the Herzogliches Museum. It shows the Portrait of a Man in a Wide-Brimmed Hat as it was then hung (subject to a little artistic licence), near another Hals portrait that is now in a private collection.

== Retribution, theft, return, and restoration ==
In retribution (and not only as reparation) for the immense losses suffered by the people of the Soviet Union at the hands of Germany in the Second World War, occupying Soviet authorities carefully removed a large number of works from Reinhardsbrunn Palace (some 13 kilometres (8.1 mi) from Gotha) in 1945 and sent them to Russia. They included the Portrait of a Man in a Wide-Brimmed Hat, which was in storage at Reinhardsbrunn for safekeeping. The plan was to build a new museum in Moscow exhibiting art from the West. However, following a change of policy after the GDR had become established as an ally of the Soviet Union, the Portrait of a Man in a Wide-Brimmed Hat was returned to Gotha in 1958.

Twenty-one years later, the painting was stolen. In the early hours of 14 December 1979, one or more burglars broke into Friedenstein Palace and stole the Portrait of a Man in a Wide-Brimmed Hat as well as works by (or after) Ferdinand Bol, Jan Brueghel the Elder, Anthony van Dyck, and Hans Holbein the Elder in an evidently carefully planned and targeted operation. The police feared at the time that the paintings were damaged, because they found a trail of broken picture-frame parts on the escape route through the palace gardens. But despite extensive investigations by both the VoPo and the Stasi into what was the most significant art theft ever in the GDR, the trail went cold. In 2008, the mayor of Gotha, Knut Kreuch, launched a media campaign in an effort to find and recover the stolen works, to no avail.

Then in June 2018, Kreuch was approached by a lawyer known to facilitate the return of stolen works of art. After long and sensitive negotiations conducted by Kreuch in person, the five pictures were given back "in fairly good shape" on 12 September 2019. Conservator Fuhyi Kuo restored the Portrait of a Man in a Wide-Brimmed Hat in Gotha, and the five returned works were exhibited together at the Herzogliches Museum in 2021–2022.

== Attribution ==
Ernest II of Saxe-Gotha-Altenburg acquired the Portrait of a Man in a Wide-Brimmed Hat for the Gotha ducal collection in 1804. There it was at first attributed to Thomas de Keyser, but Schneider (1854), Ernst Wilhelm Moes (1909), Cornelis Hofstede de Groot (1910), Wilhelm von Bode (1914), Wilhelm Valentiner (1923), Frans Dony (1976), and the Herzogliches Museum all attribute the painting to Frans Hals.

Some other authorities, such as Seymour Slive, do not. In his 1974 catalogue, Slive lists the portrait but glosses its attribution to Frans Hals as ("D" for) doubtful—he had not had occasion to inspect the original work. In accord with Slive, Claus Grimm's 1989 catalogue omits the portrait from the works attributed to Frans Hals. Based on his analysis of particular aspects of the portrait's execution, Grimm, writing in 2024 for the RKD institute in The Hague, assigns the work to Hals's workshop or circle.

When the painting was recovered in 2019, the Herzogliches Museum had it examined for authenticity at the Rathgen Research Laboratory in Berlin, which conducted infra-red reflectographic, radiographic, and macro analyses. Based on the report from the Rathgen and on Kleinert's opinion, the Herzogliches Museum concluded that the portrait is indeed the work of Frans Hals himself.

== Date ==
Hofstede de Groot dates the portrait "about 1630–5". Valentiner has 1631–1633 but wonders whether it might not be a few years earlier. Kleinert has 1625–1630.

== Illustrations for comparison ==
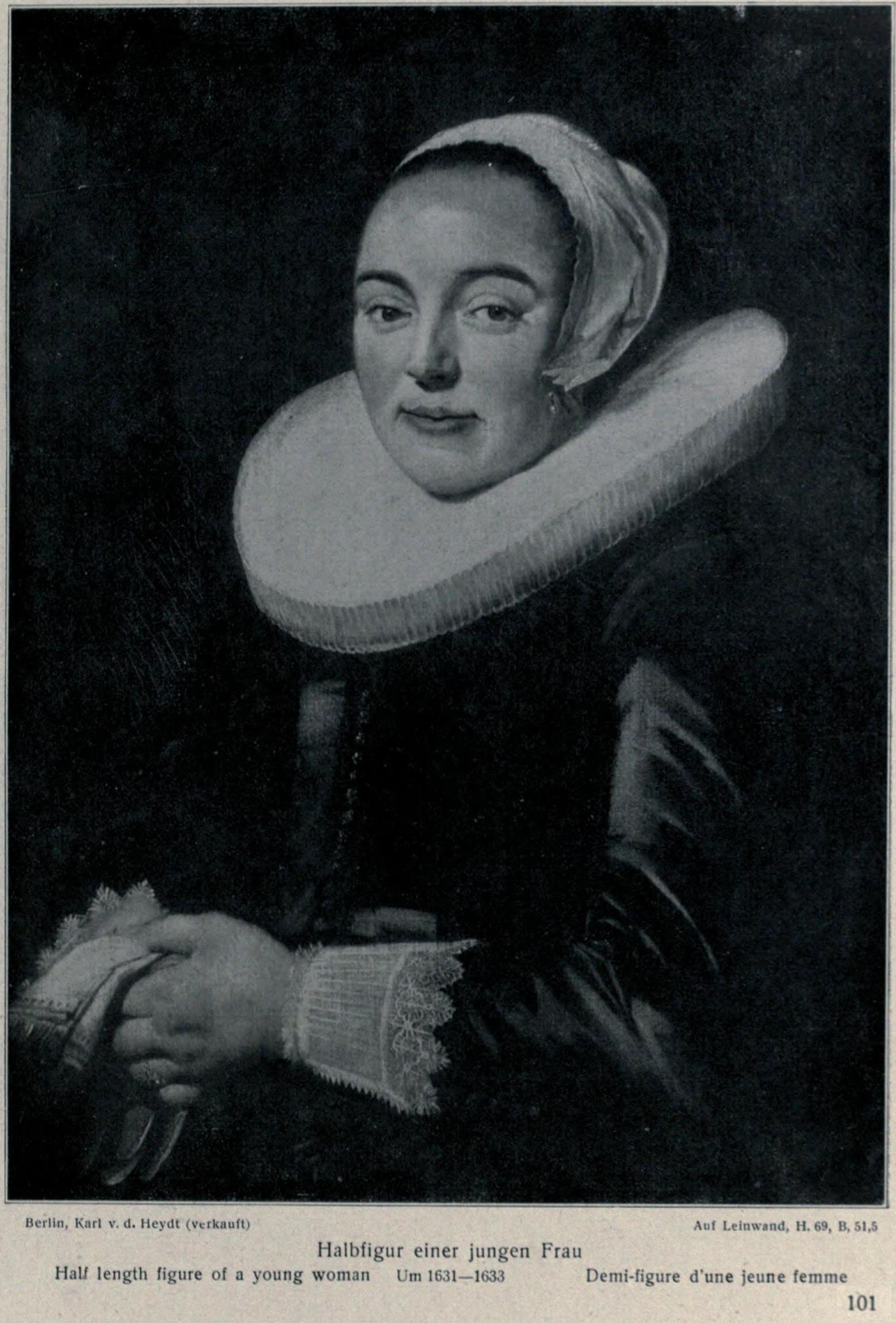
Disattributed Portrait of a Seated Woman at Göteborg

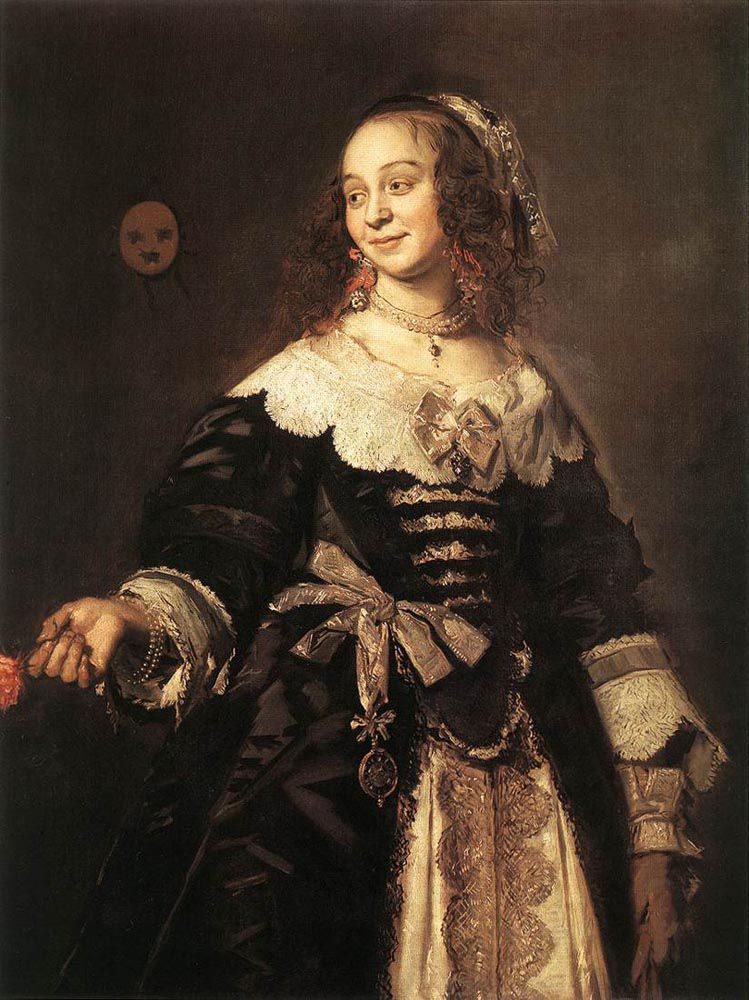
Isabella Coymans by Frans Hals

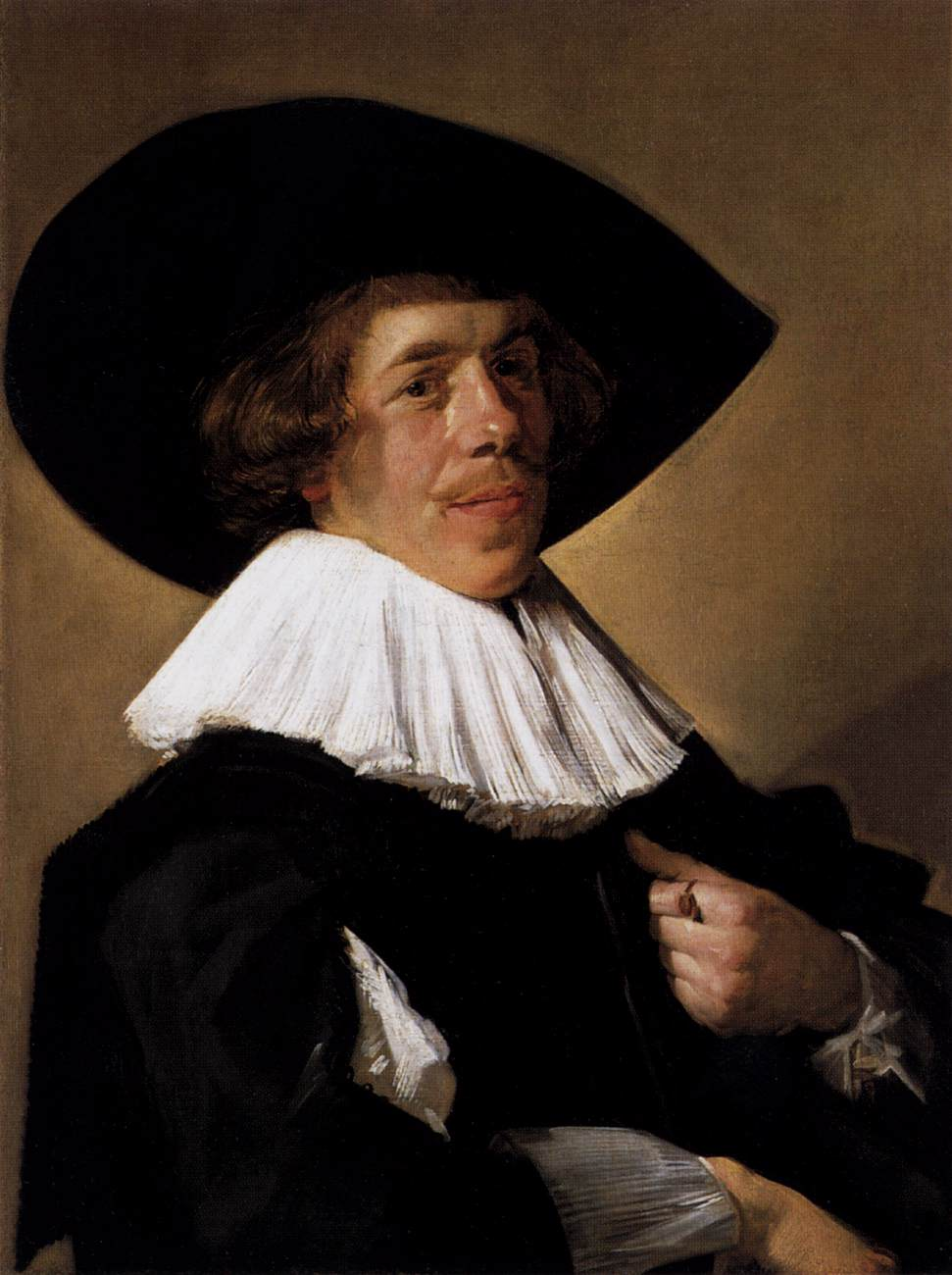
Jan Miense Molenaar(?) by Frans Hals

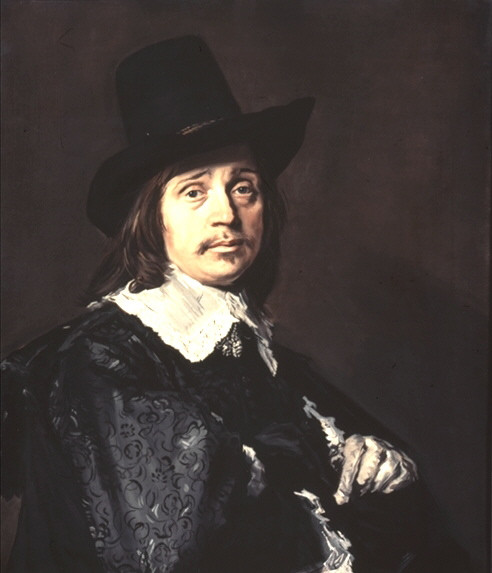
The other Hals portrait that used to hang in Gotha

Wilhelm Valentiner thought the Portrait of a Seated Woman possibly a pendant to the Portrait of a Man in a Wide-Brimmed Hat, but it has since been disattributed. The woman wears a "millstone" ruff.

Isabella Coymans is a good example of Hals's "rough" or "loose" style of painting applied to black clothes.

(Thought to be) Jan Miense Molenaar (though the identity of the sitter is not certain) was painted by Frans Hals at about the same time as the similarly attired and posed Portrait of a Man in a Wide-Brimmed Hat. The face is handled similarly in the two portraits, as is the background. However, Molenaar wears big pleated cuffs, and his cloak is (deliberately) "slashed" to reveal the quality of his white shirt.

The other, later, portrait of a man with a hat by Frans Hals that once also hung at the Herzogliches Museum is now in a private collection. This sitter wears a glove, signalling his wealth.

== See also ==
- List of paintings by Frans Hals
