= Eberhard Schenk zu Schweinsberg =

German art historian

Eberhard Freiherr Schenk zu Schweinsberg (4 February 1893 - 29 March 1990) was a German art historian.

== Life ==
He was born in Darmstadt, the youngest child of Gustav Schenk zu Schweinsberg (1842–1922), state archive director and state historian. He studied art history, archaeology and history in Darmstadt, Munich, Frankfurt, Berlin and Jena and in 1921 graduated from the University of Jena. In the meantime, in 1919, he had already become a museum assistant in Weimar, rising to Custodian or "Kustos" in 1923. He was director of the Städtische Galerie in Wiesbaden from 1929 to 1934, as well as teaching at the Nassauischen Kunstverein. His next post was as director of the Ducal Museum Gotha from 1934 to 1946. In 1948 he returned to Wiesbaden, where he then published several works, particularly on glass art and castles, and died in 1990.

== Selected works ==
- Die Illustrationen der Chronik von Flandern – Handschrift Nr 437 – der Stadtbibliothek zu Brügge und ihr Verhältnis zu Hans Memling (= Studien zur deutschen Kunstgeschichte. Heft 224). Heitz, Strassburg 1922 (Dissertation, Eberhard Schenk zu Schweinsberg is available for free viewing and download at the Internet Archive).
- Verzeichnis der Radierungen von Georg Melchior Kraus. In: Jahrbuch der Sammlung Kippenberg. Band 7, 1927/28, ISSN 0448-133X, S. 277–302 (Digitalisat), Ergänzungen in: Jahrbuch der Sammlung Kippenberg. Band 10, 1935, S. 316–318 (Digitalisat).
- Georg Melchior Kraus. Weimar 1930 (= Schriften der Goethe-Gesellschaft. Band 43).
- Bischöfliches Diözesan-Museum, Limburg/Lahn. Limburg 1951.
- Rheingau und Taunus (Deutsche Lande, deutsche Kunst). Deutscher Kunstverlag, München/Berlin 1957.
- Schloss Homburg vor der Höhe. Amtlicher Führer. Deutscher Kunstverlag, München / Berlin 1959.
- Form und Schmuck des Hohlglases an Beispielen der Sammlung Schott (= Schott-Schriften 2). Jenaer Glaswerk Schott u. Gen., Mainz 1966.
- Bildnisgläser der Sammlung Heine in Karlsruhe. Ariel-Verlag, Frankfurt a. M. 1970.
- Schloss Wilhelmshöhe, Bad Homburg von der Höhe: Verwaltung der Staatlichen Schlösser und Gärten in Hessen, 1974
- Schloss Fasanerie vor Fulda, Kleine Kunst- und Kirchenführer, 973, München / Zürich: Schnell und Steiner, 1974

== Bibliography ==
- (in German) 'Schenk zu Schweinsberg, Eberhard Frh. von.' In: Walther Killy, Rudolf Vierhaus (ed.): Deutsche Biographische Enzyklopädie. 1. Auflage. Band 8: Plett–Schmidseder. K. G. Saur, München 1998, ISBN 3-598-23168-7.
