= Museum of Nature Gotha =

Museum in Gotha, Germany

Coordinates: 50°56′36″N 10°42′21″E

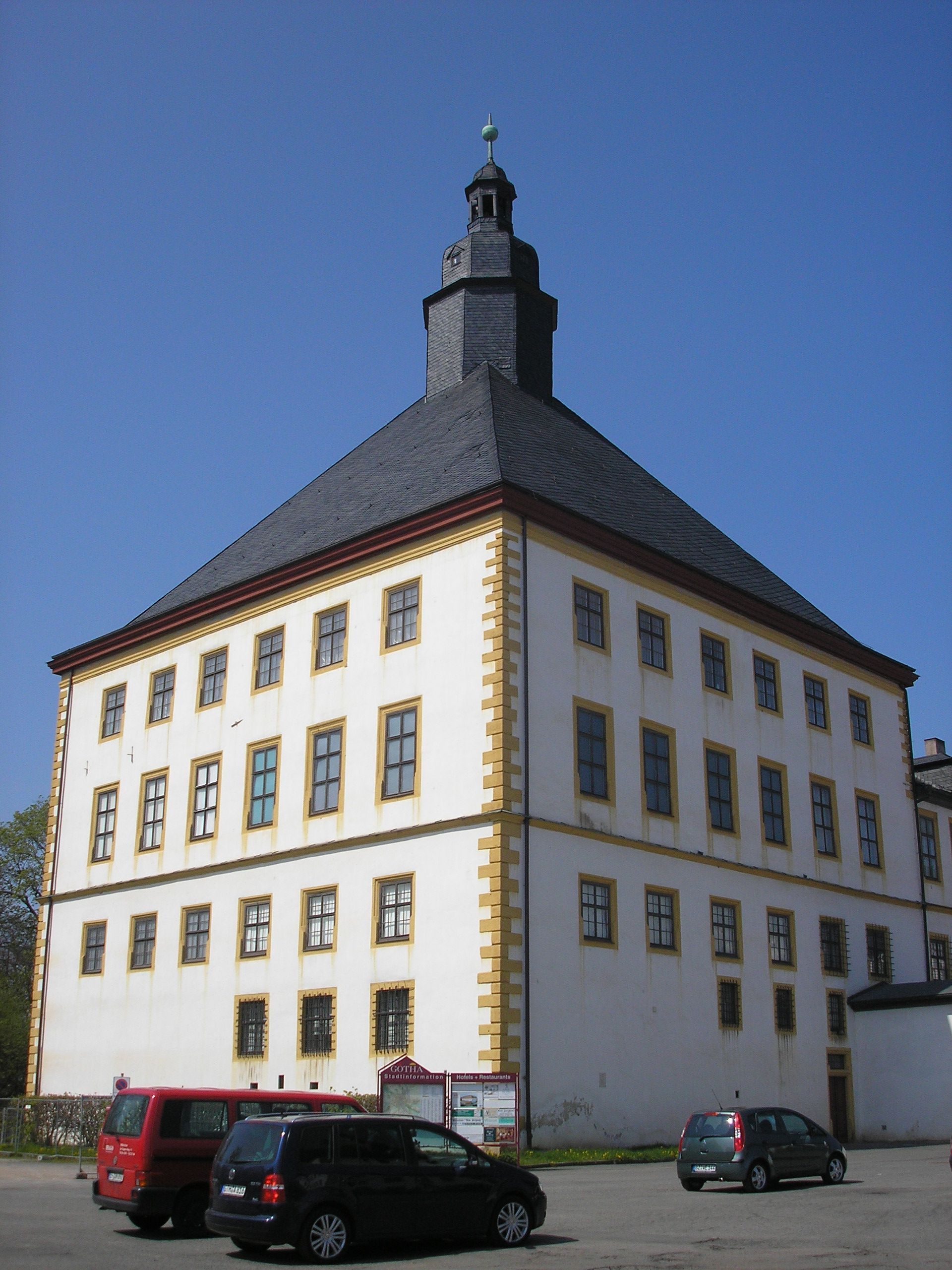
The palace's west tower, housing the new permanent exhibition "Tiere im Turm" ("Animals in the Tower") since April 2010.

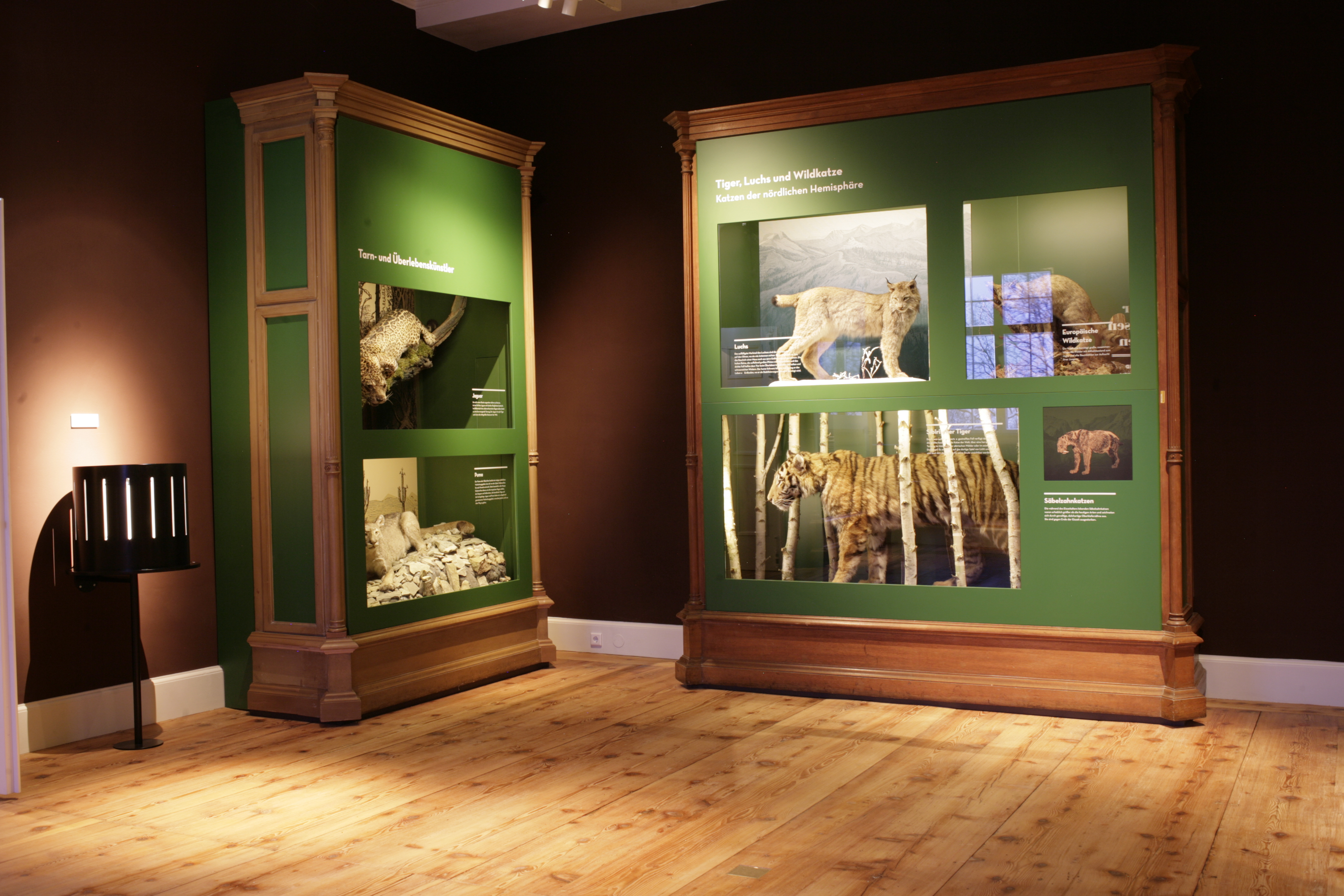
The display in the tower.

The Museum of Nature Gotha (German - Museum der Natur Gotha) is a museum in the German city of Gotha. Since 2004 it has been one of four museums run by the Schloss Friedenstein Foundation Gotha (Stiftung Schloss Friedenstein Gotha), named after the Schloss Friedenstein in the city. Particularly notable are the 1952-1954 hunting and animal-scene diorama backgrounds created by Friedrich Reimann, who also designed the murals in the entrance hall and stairwell.

Its collections cover geology, palaeontology and zoology and were begun in the 17th century by the Dukes of Saxe-Gotha-Altenburg. When they and the ducal art collections outgrew the Schloss, Ernest II, Duke of Saxe-Coburg and Gotha built a new Ducal Museum for the paintings, antiquities, plaster casts and the nature cabinet between 1864 and 1879. After much of the art collections were looted by the Soviets in 1945, the natural science collections were moved into the Ducal Museum and remained there after most of the art returned in 1956, being expanded by the addition of the Naturkundliche Heimatmuseum's collections.

After being remodelled, the former Ducal Museum building reopened on 1 August 1954 as the Biologische Zentralmuseum (Central Biological Museum). Thuringia's largest natural history museum, it was later renamed the Naturkundemuseum (Natural History Museum) before taking on its present name in 1971. The natural history, geology and palaeontology collections returned to the Schloss in 2010, where they still reside.

== Temporary exhibitions ==
- 2006 Bionik – Vom Ursaurier zum laufenden Roboter
- 2007 Gotha – Im Reich der Göttin Freiheit. Der erste Englische Landschaftsgarten auf dem Kontinent
- 2008 Nacht(s) im Museum
- 2009 Die Kleider der Tiere
- 2010 Anatomie – Gotha geht unter die Haut (collaboration with the Schlossmuseum and the Museum für Regionalgeschichte und Volkskunde)
- 2011 Elefantastisch (collaboration with the Schlossmuseum and the Museum für Regionalgeschichte und Volkskunde)

== Bibliography (in German) ==
- Museen der Stiftung Schloss Friedenstein Gotha, Deutscher Kunstverlag, April 2007
- Das Barocke Universum Gotha, Druckmedienzentrum Gotha, 2011
- Thomas Martens (2000), Ursaurier zwischen Thüringer Wald und Rocky Mountains. Eine Zeitreise in die Erdgeschichte vor 290 Millionen Jahren, Begleitheft zur Ausstellung von Thomas Martens, Museum der Natur Gotha, DNB-IDN: 961751592
- W. Zimmermann (1984), "Die entomologischen und arachnologischen Sammlungen des Museums der Natur Gotha", Abhandlungen und Berichte des Museums der Natur Gotha, vol. 12, pp. 39–43
- W. Joost (1965), "Die entomologischen Sammlungen des Naturkundemuseums Gotha", Abhandlungen und Berichte des Naturkundemuseums Gotha, vol. 2, pp. 79–96
- R. Bellstedt, R. Samietz (2002), "Katalog der in den Sammlungen des Museums der Natur Gotha aufbewahrten Typen", Abhandlungen und Berichte des Museums der Natur Gotha, vol. 22, pp. 187–196
- R. Bährmann (1999), "Zur Kenntnis der Dipterensammlungen Deutschlands", Beiträge zur Entomologie, vol. 49, pp. 173–209
- M. Joost (1990), "Die Conchyliensammlung im Museum der Natur Gotha", Abhandlungen und Berichte des Museums der Natur Gotha, vol. 16, pp. 37–50
- W. Zimmermann (1971), "Zur Kenntnis der Fledermäuse (Chiroptera, Mammalia) in Westthüringen", Abhandlungen und Berichte des Museums der Natur Gotha, pp. 77–94
- Gerd Seidel (1992), Thüringer Becken, Sammlung geologischer Führer, 85, Berlin: Bornträger-Verlag, ISBN 3-443-15058-6
- Thomas Martens (2003), Thüringer Wald, Sammlung geologischer Führer, 95, Berlin/ Stuttgart: Bornträger-Verlag, ISBN 3-443-15078-0
