= Ducal Museum Gotha =

Museum in Gotha, Thuringia, Germany

Coordinates: 50°56′36″N 10°42′21″E

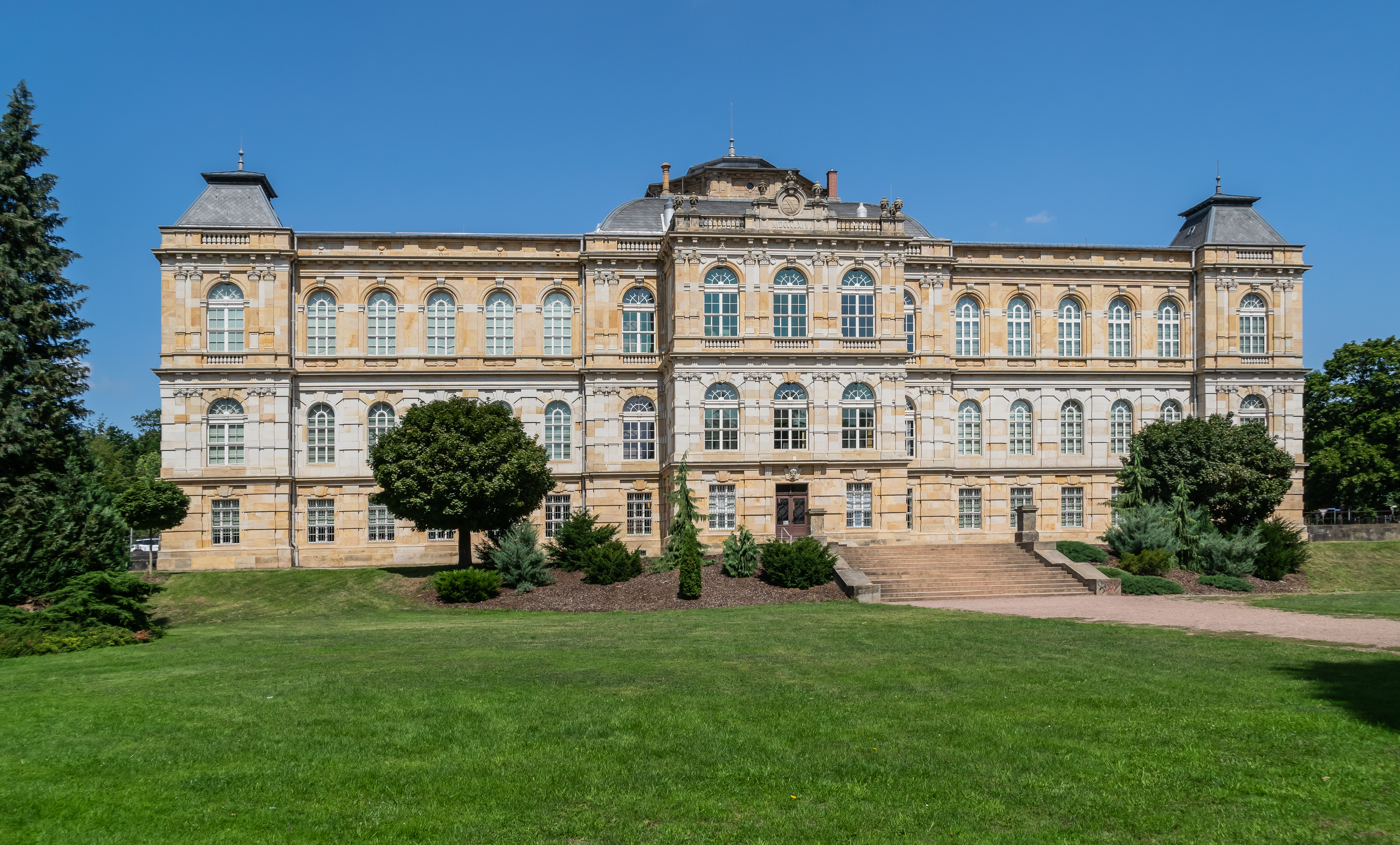
The Museum at its reopening in 2013.

The Ducal Museum Gotha (German: Herzogliches Museum Gotha) is a museum in the German city of Gotha, located in the Schlosspark to the south of the Schloss Friedenstein. Its collection was the art collection of the former Duchy of Saxe-Gotha, consisting of Egyptian and Greco-Roman antiquities, Renaissance paintings such as The Lovers, Chinese and Japanese art, and sculptures from various eras.

Reopening in 2013, it is housed in a 19th-century Neo-Renaissance building owned by the city, whilst the museum itself and its collections are managed by the Friedenstein Castle Foundation Gotha (Stiftung Schloss Friedenstein Gotha), founded in 2004. Martin Eberle has been the Foundation's director since 2007.

== History ==
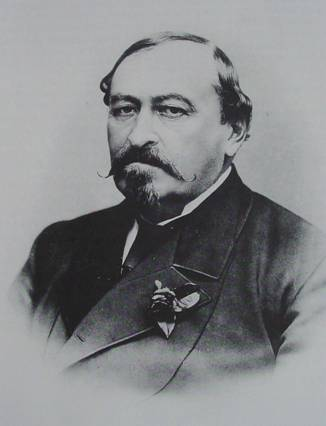
Duke Ernest II, founder of the Ducal Museum

=== 1863-1879 ===
The constant growth of the ducal collections at Friedenstein Castle, including a library, art, coin and natural history cabinets, paintings, engravings and plaster casts, necessitated the construction of a new separate museum building. In 1863 Ernest II, Duke of Saxe-Coburg and Gotha commissioned one with the approval of the Duchy's parliament on the condition that it was open to the public and free-entry on Sundays. According to the Duke's wishes, it was to contain all of the ducal collections except the library. Initially, construction costs were estimated at 120,000 thalers, financed from the ducal assets.

A site was chosen on the former site of the ducal kitchen garden. Franz von Neumann the Elder (1815–1888) had been in the duke's service since 1839 and he was entrusted with designing the new museum in 1864, with construction work starting that June. He estimated construction costs (excluding interior furnishings) at 145,000 thalers and construction time as four years.

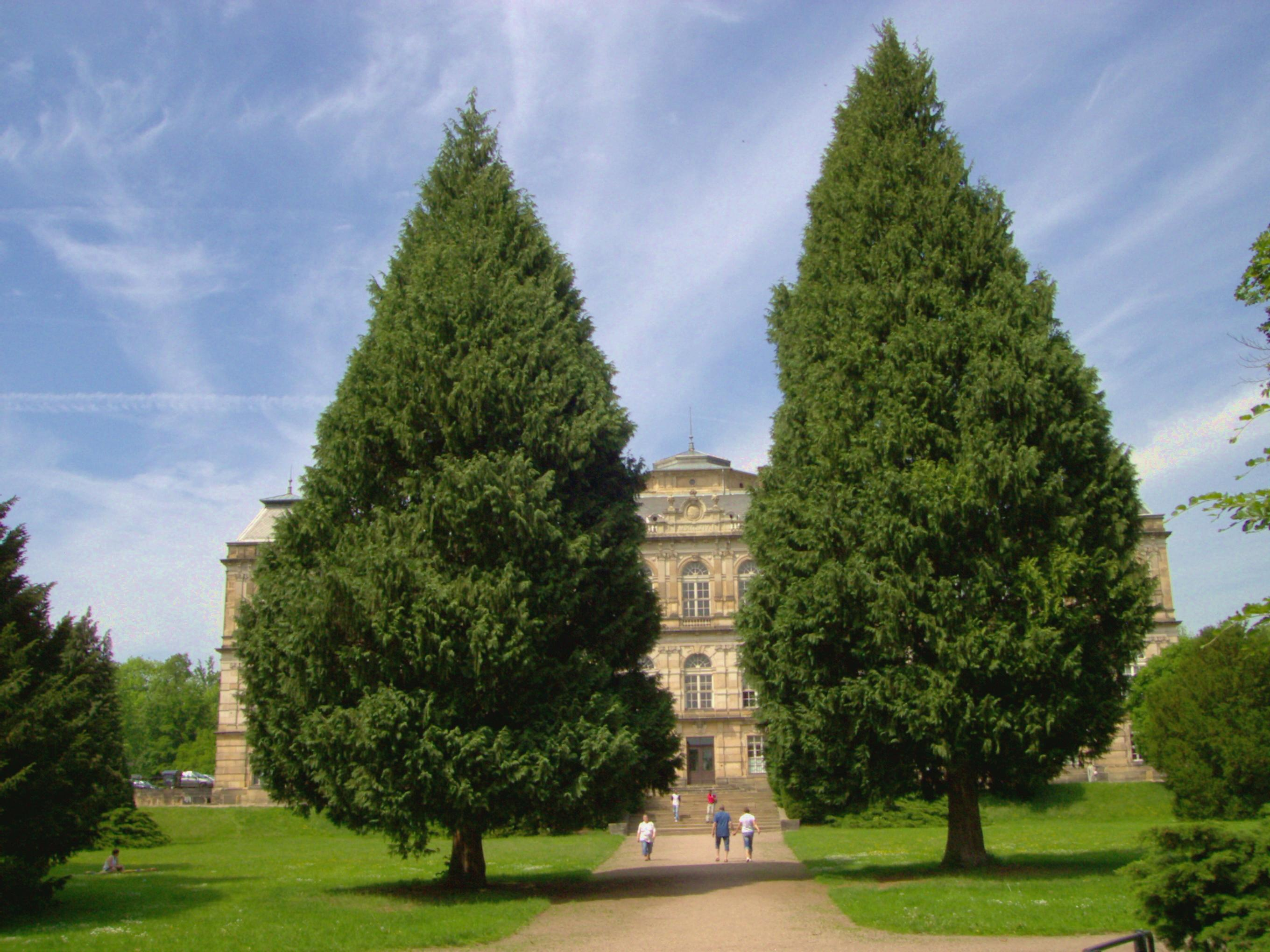
In 1869 the Tannengarten was created as a natural continuation of the museum's natural history collection.

The Tannengarten (literally fir-tree garden) was added to the building's south in 1869, with around 170 conifers of over 40 different varieties from all over the world planted in it, mainly in spring 1872. The garden's tree collection was deliberately designed as a natural "continuation" of the museum's natural history collection and was complete by 1882. Starting from the wide-open staircase on the museum's south terrace, the chief court gardener Carl Theobald Eulefeld (1818–1877) laid out a wide promenade dividing the former kitchen garden area into two halves and leading into the south end of the Englischer Garten with the Great Park Pond.

The construction estimate proved to be far short of the mark and the budget was raised to 200,000 thalers in 1867. That estimate rose to 400,000 thalers by 1870, particularly for completing the interior, but this could not be raised so construction was paused for four years that November. After the architect agreed to make restrictions and the Duke and parliament to cover the missing funds 70:30 respectively, construction work resumed in May 1875. When it became apparent at the beginning of 1878 that the interior work had again gone over budget, von Neumann was dismissed as construction manager. On 17 April 1879, fifteen years after construction began, the building finally opened.

=== 1880-present ===
At the end of the Second World War, the collections of the Ducal Museum were heavily affected by looting before the Soviets' arrival. What was left of the art collection was taken to the USSR and only returned to the city in 1956, after which they were housed in the Friedenstein Palace. The natural science collections remained in the building which had previously also housed the Ducal Museum and were expanded to include the holdings of the Natural History Museum. After the building was remodelled, the Central Biological Museum was opened in the former Ducal Museum on 1 August 1954. The largest natural history museum in Thuringia at the time, it was later renamed the Naturkundemuseum (Natural History Museum) and then in 1971 it was the Museum der Natur Gotha (Museum of Nature Gotha).

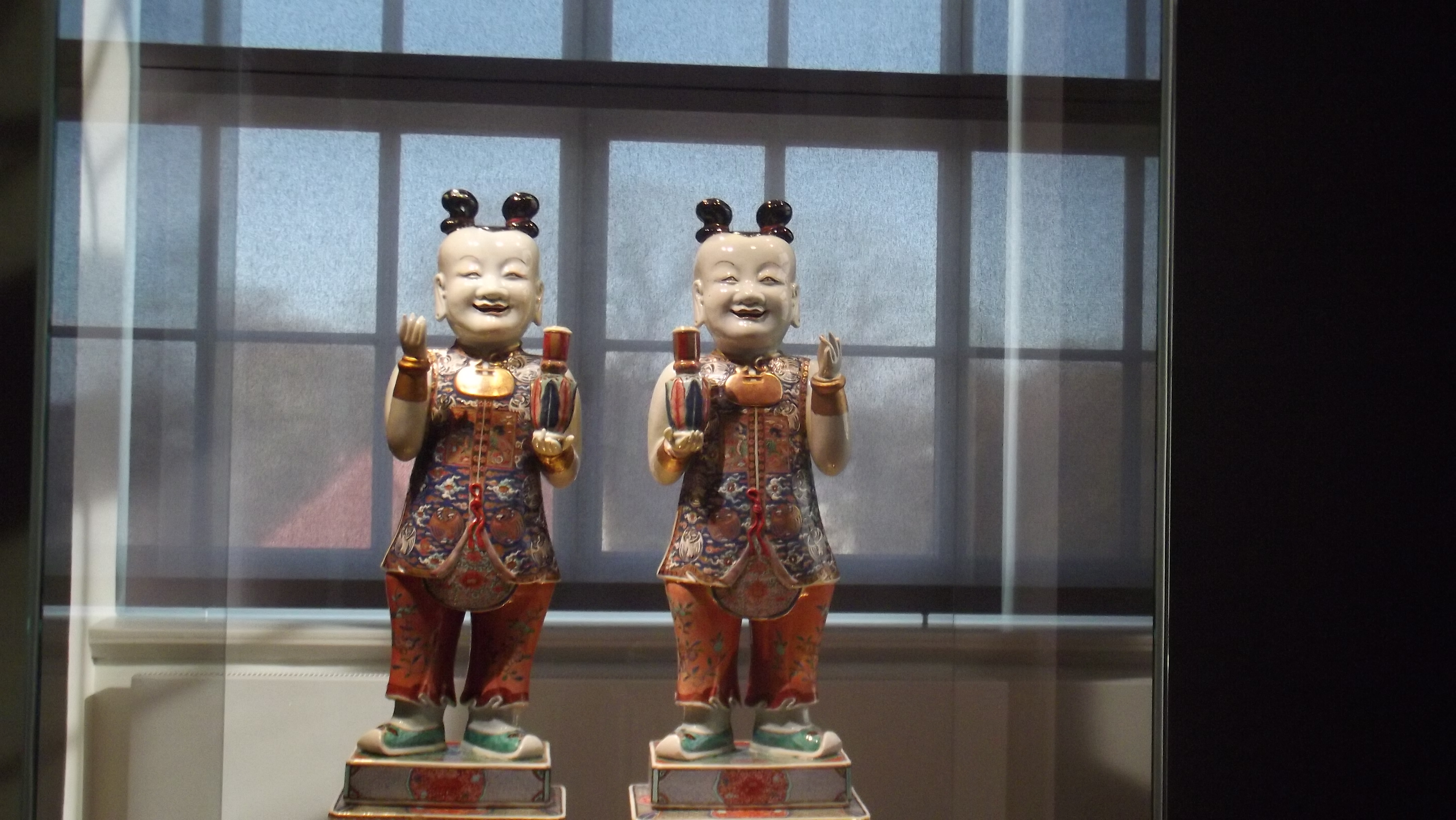
Asian porcelain display

As part of a reconceiving of Gotha's museums, it closed in 2010 and the natural history collections were relocated to the Palace by the end of 2011. Costing 9,000,000 Euros, the Ducal Museum's renovation was completed by 19 October 2013, when it reopened with 3000 square metres of display space. This also added rooms for temporary prints and drawings exhibitions of the important print cabinet and a special exhibition area for major exhibitions by all the museums in the foundation.

== List of directors ==
=== Museum ===
- Carl Aldenhoven (1879–1890)
- Karl Purgold (1890–1934)

=== Ducal Institutes for Art and Science ===
- Eberhard Schenk zu Schweinsberg (1934–1946)

=== State Museums ===
- Bruno Voigt (1946–1983)
- Michel Hebecker (1986–1992)
- Rudolf Funk (1992)
- Klaus Roewer (1995–1997)
- Elisabeth Dobritzsch and Ulrich Mahlau (1997–1998)
- Klaus Roewer (1998–1999)
- Rainer Samietz and Ulrich Mahlau (1999–2001)

=== Friedenstein Castle Foundation Gotha ===
- Katharina Bechler (2004–2006)
- Ulrich Mahlau (2006–2007)
- Martin Eberle (2007–2018)
- Tobias Pfeifer-Helke (2019-)

== Displays ==
The basement displays show ancient Greek, Roman and Egyptian art and 18th-century Italian cork models of buildings from those civilizations. Sculptures and temporary exhibitions are housed on the ground floor, whilst the first floor houses paintings (such as Dutch Renaissance works and ones by Lucas Cranach the Elder), Chinese porcelain, Japanese lacquerware and other East Asian art.

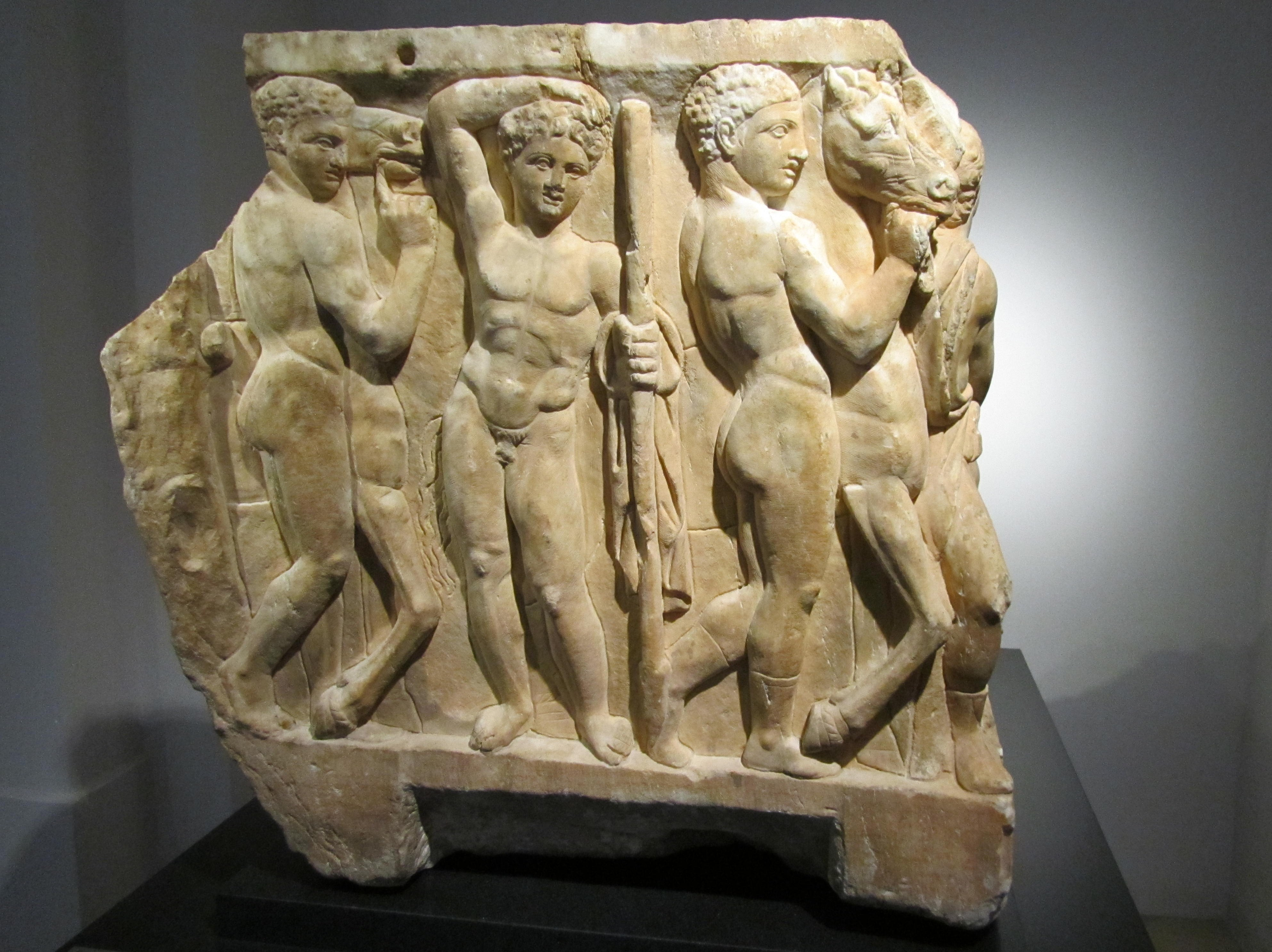
Fragment of a sarcophagus from Attica, 3rd century AD

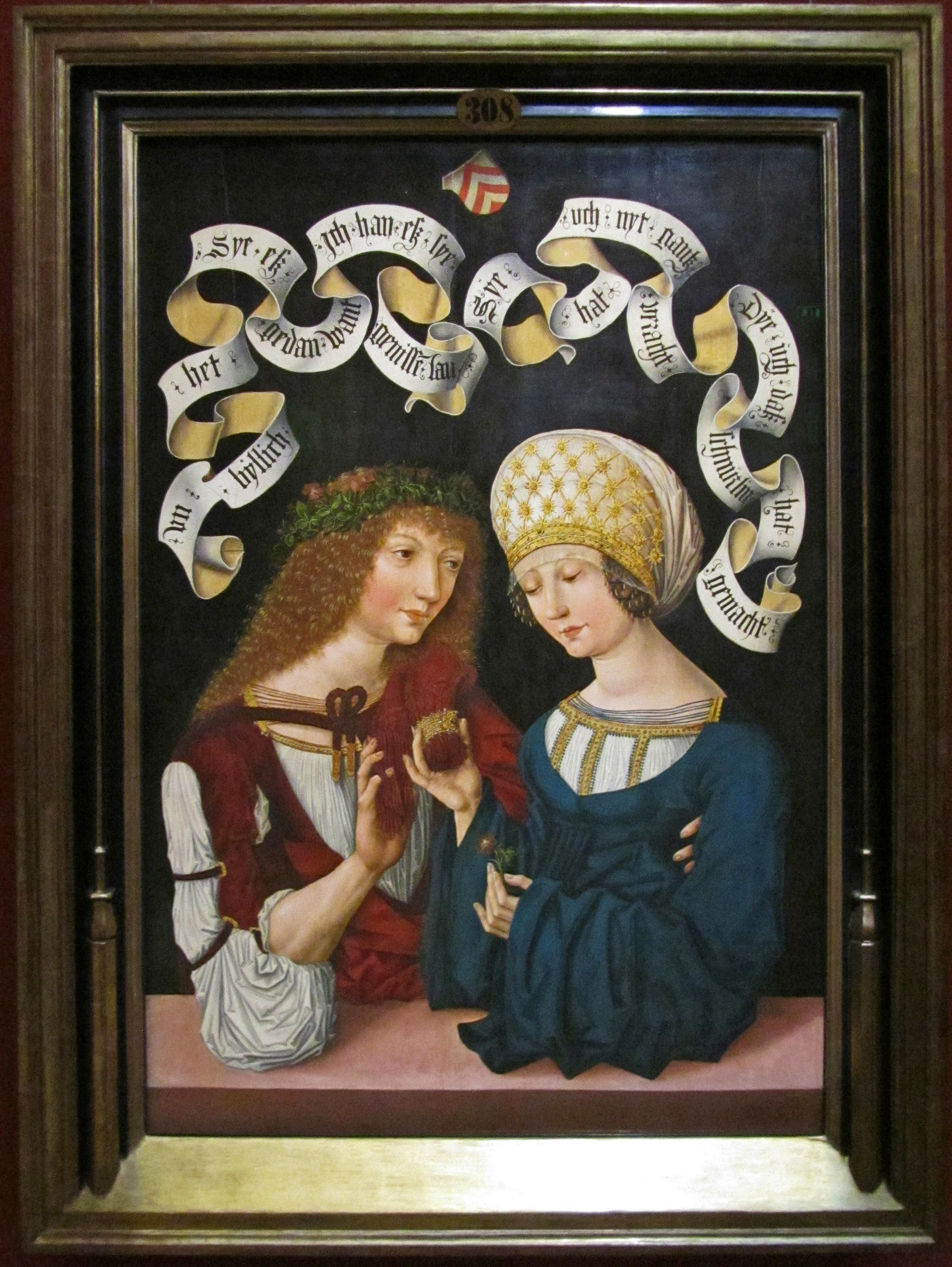
The Gotha Couple, 1480

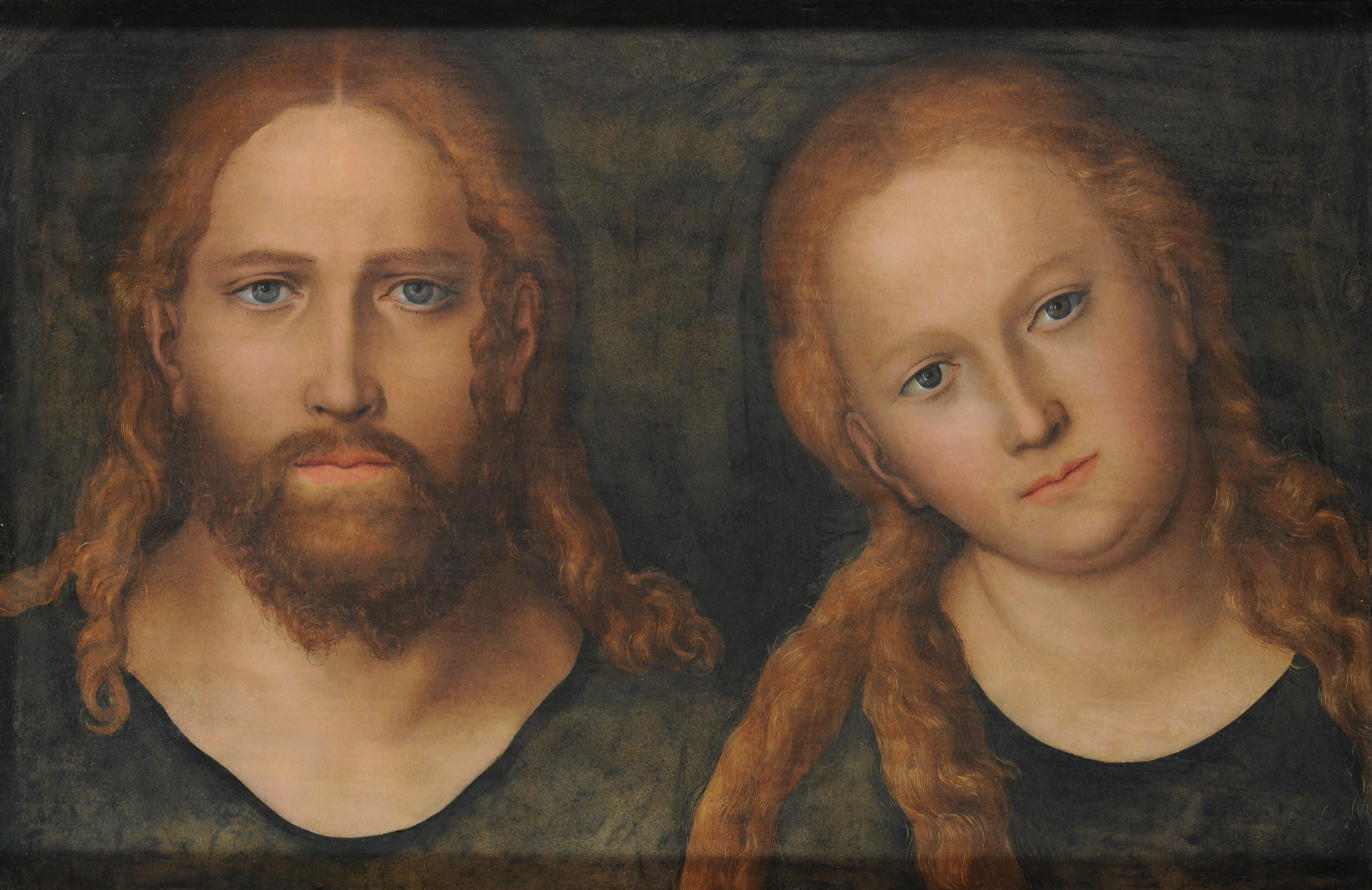
Cranach the Elder, Christ and Mary Magdalene, 1516–20

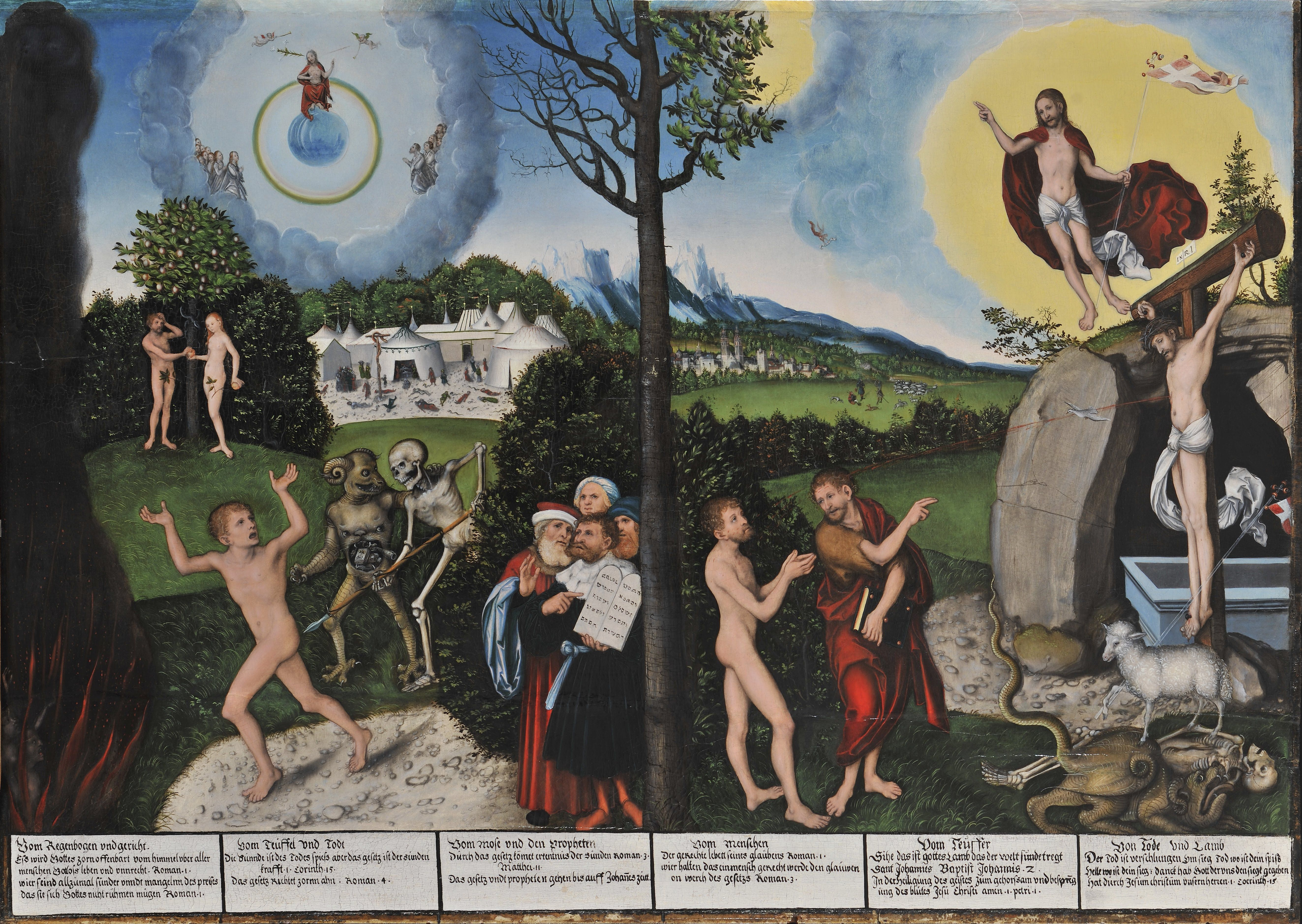
Cranach the Elder, Law and Grace, 1529

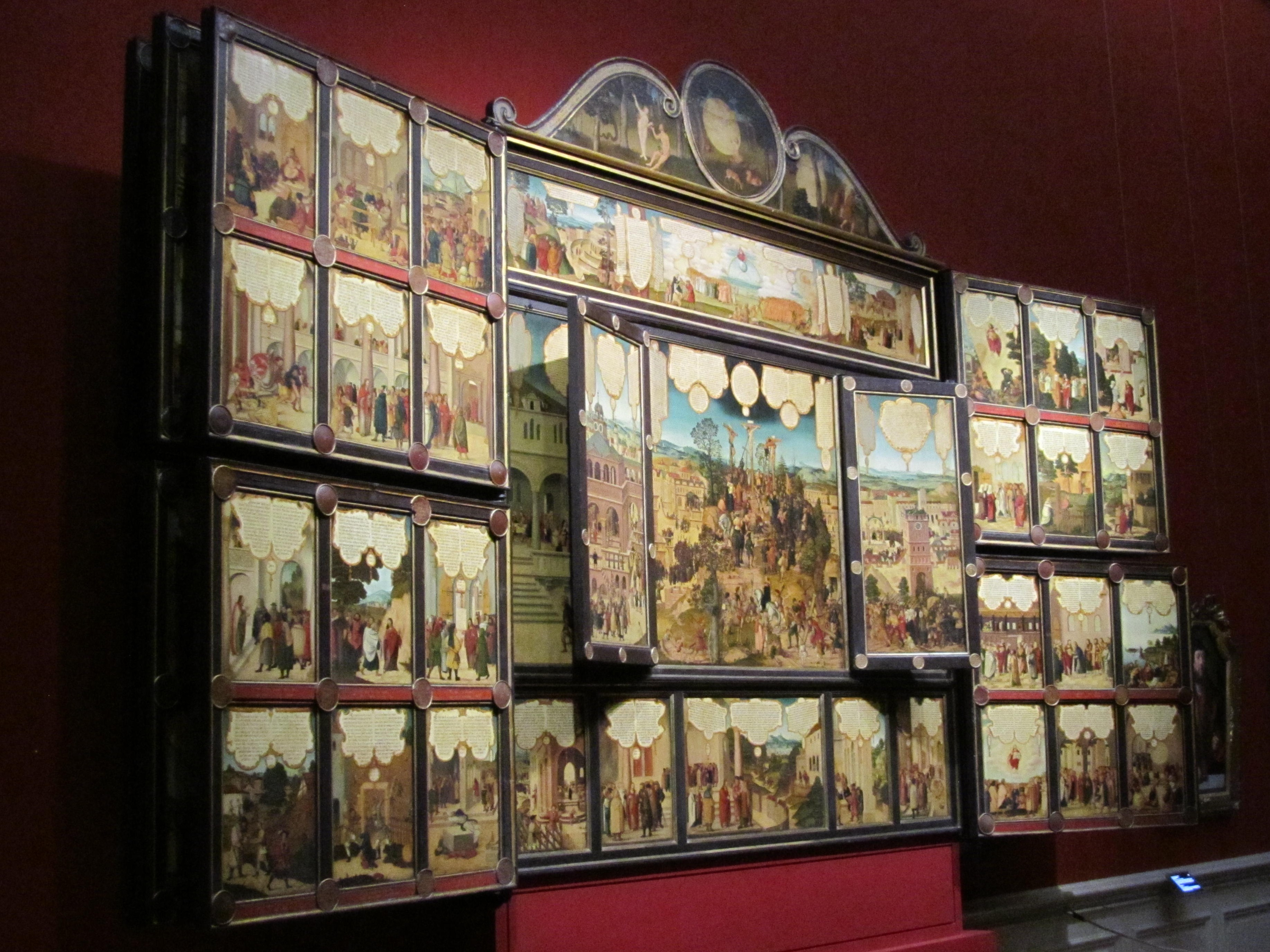
Gotha Altarpiece, 1540

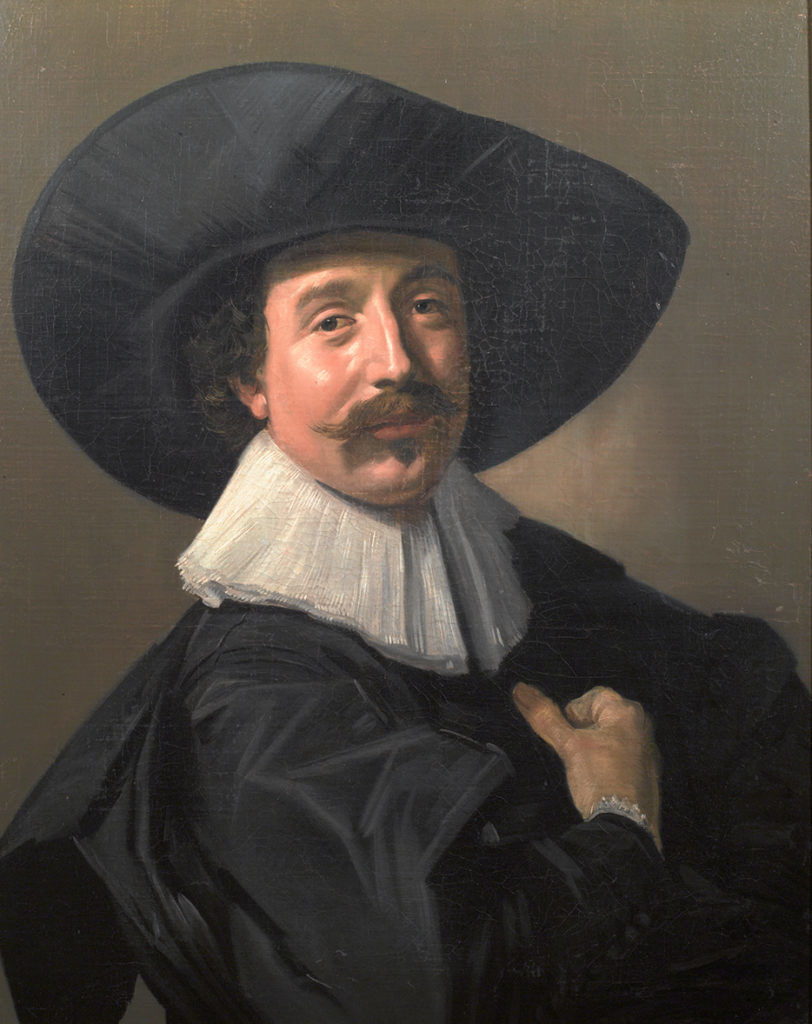
Portrait of a Man in a Wide-Brimmed Hat (Frans Hals), about 1630

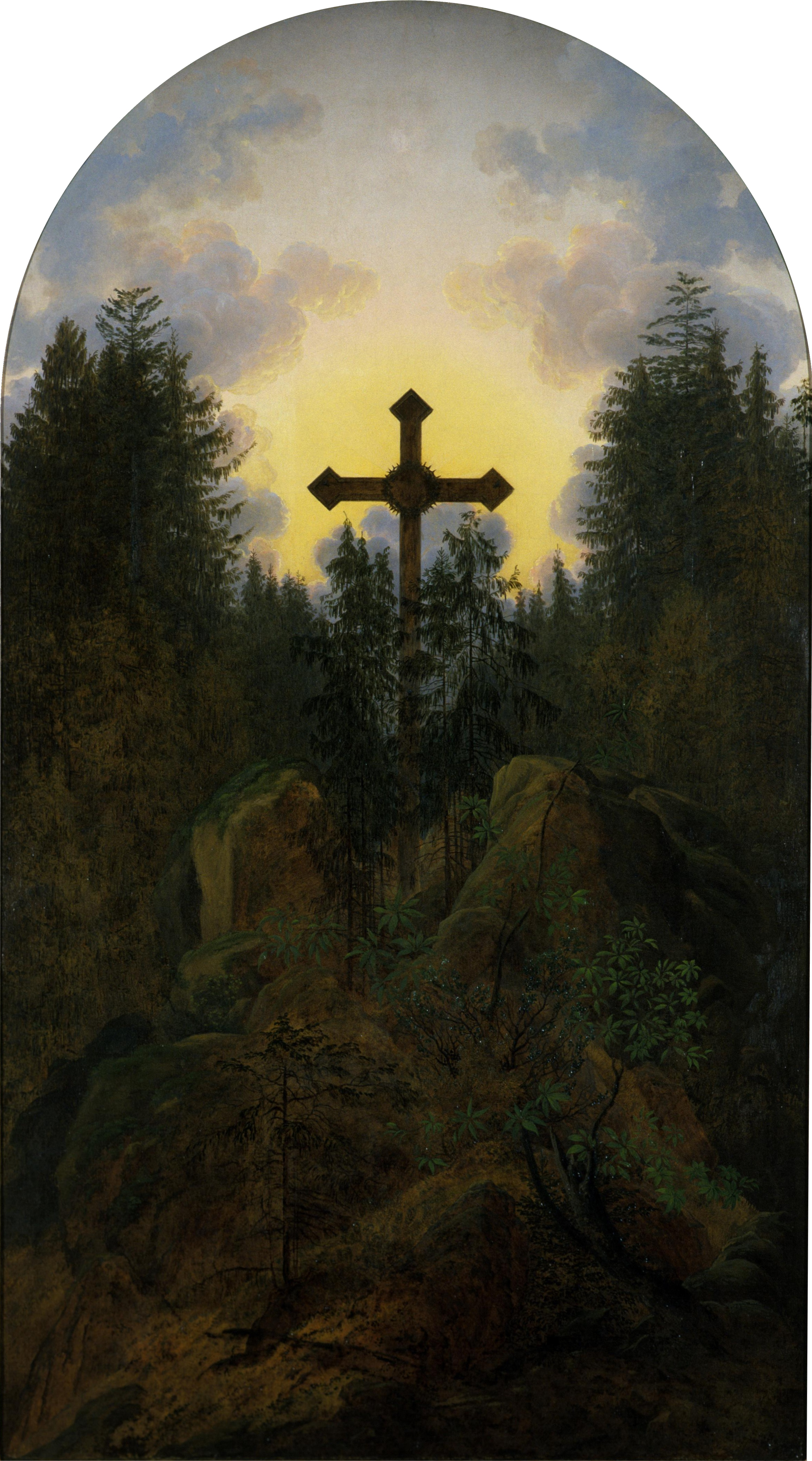
Caspar David Friedrich, Cross in the Mountains, 1823

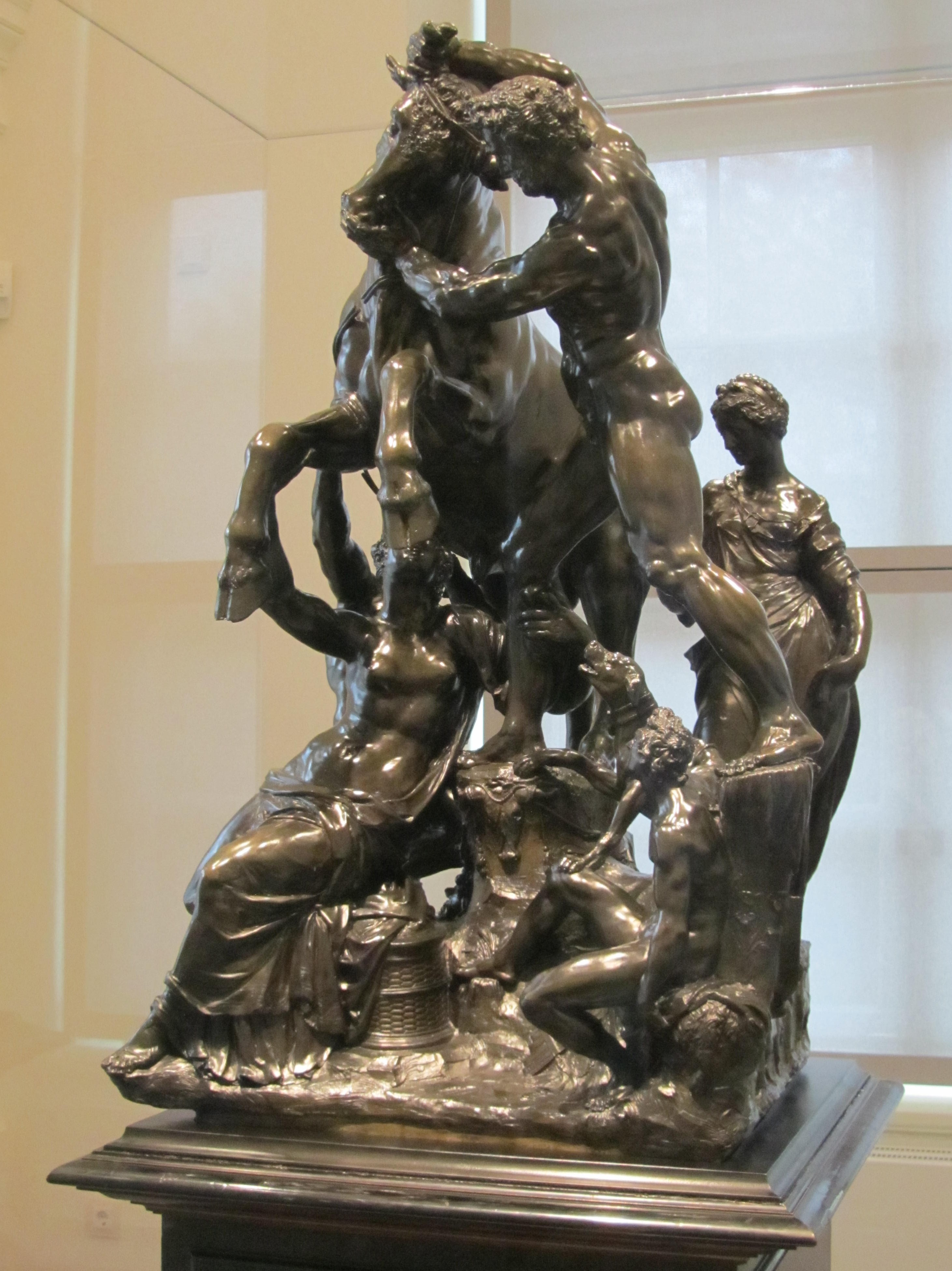
Bronze miniature copy of the Farnese Bull by Adriaen de Vries, 1614

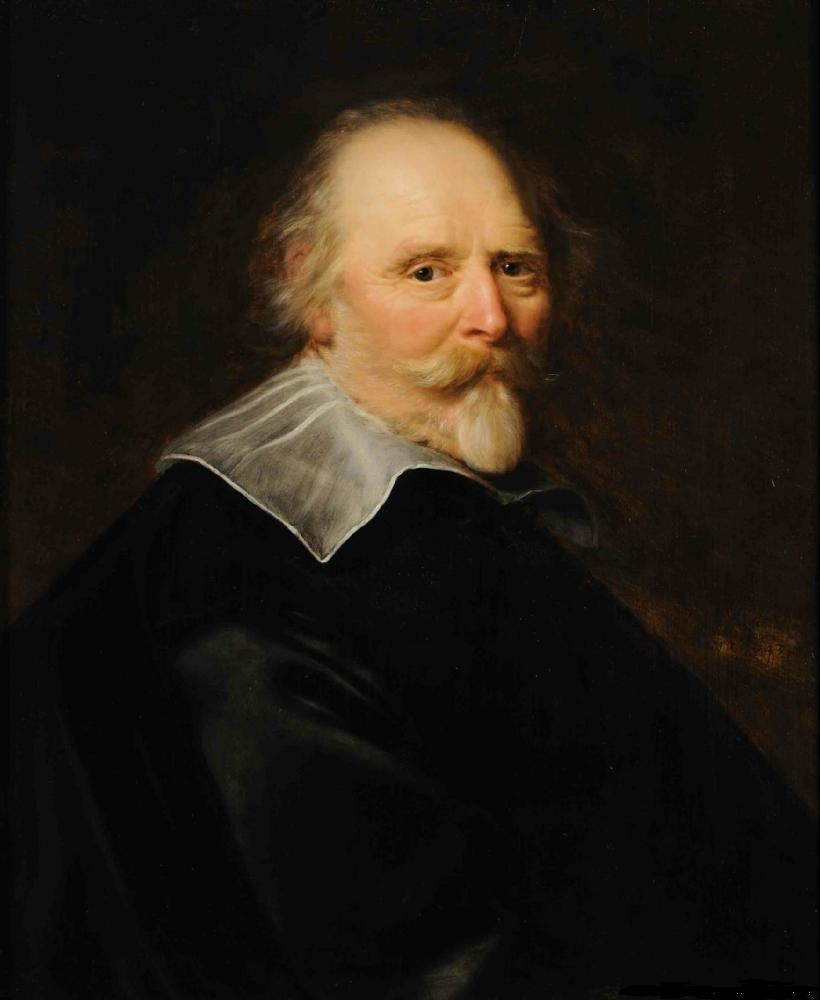
Abraham de Vries, Portrait of an Unknown Man, 1643

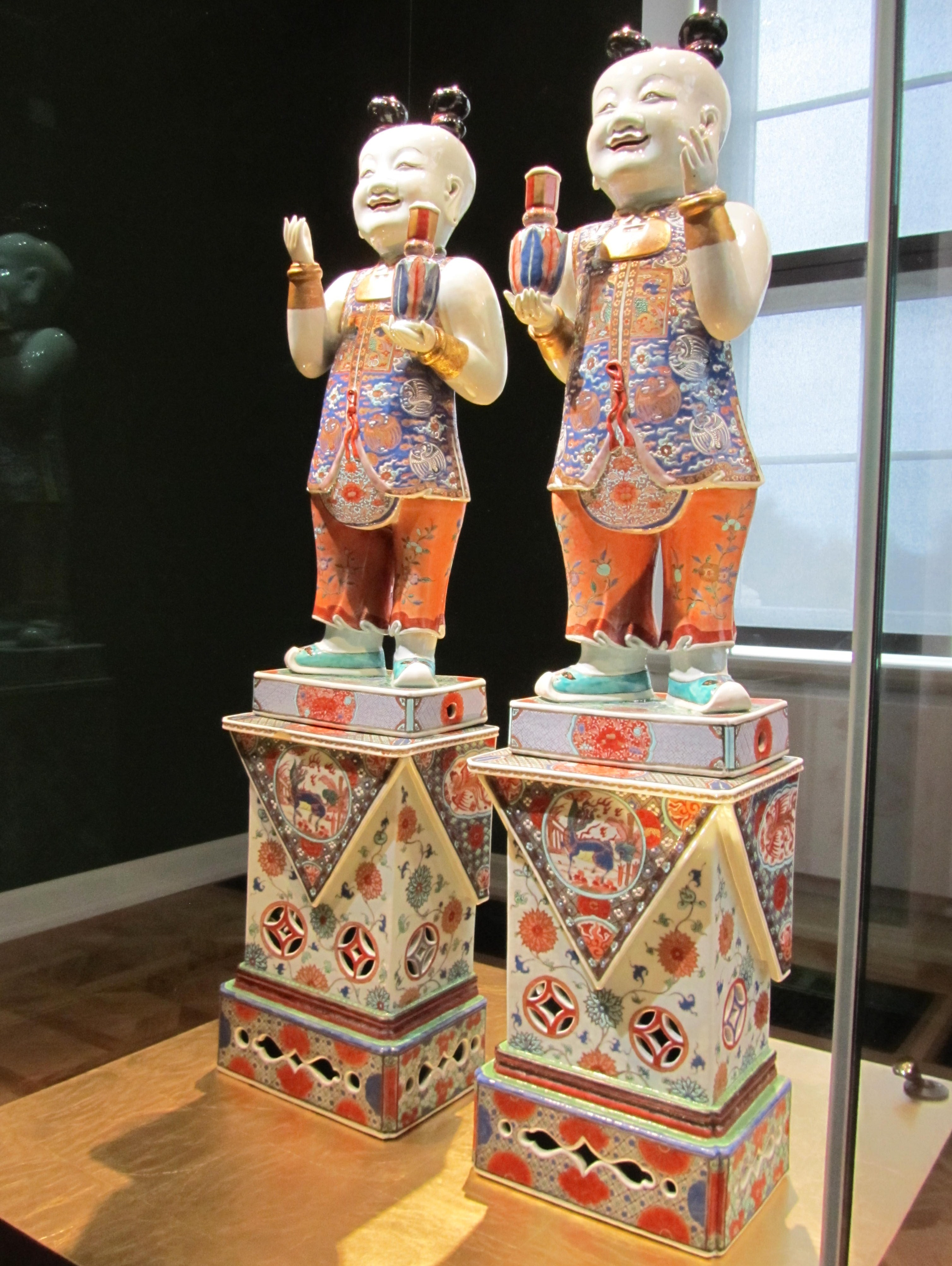
Geniuses of Concord and Harmony, China, c. 1700

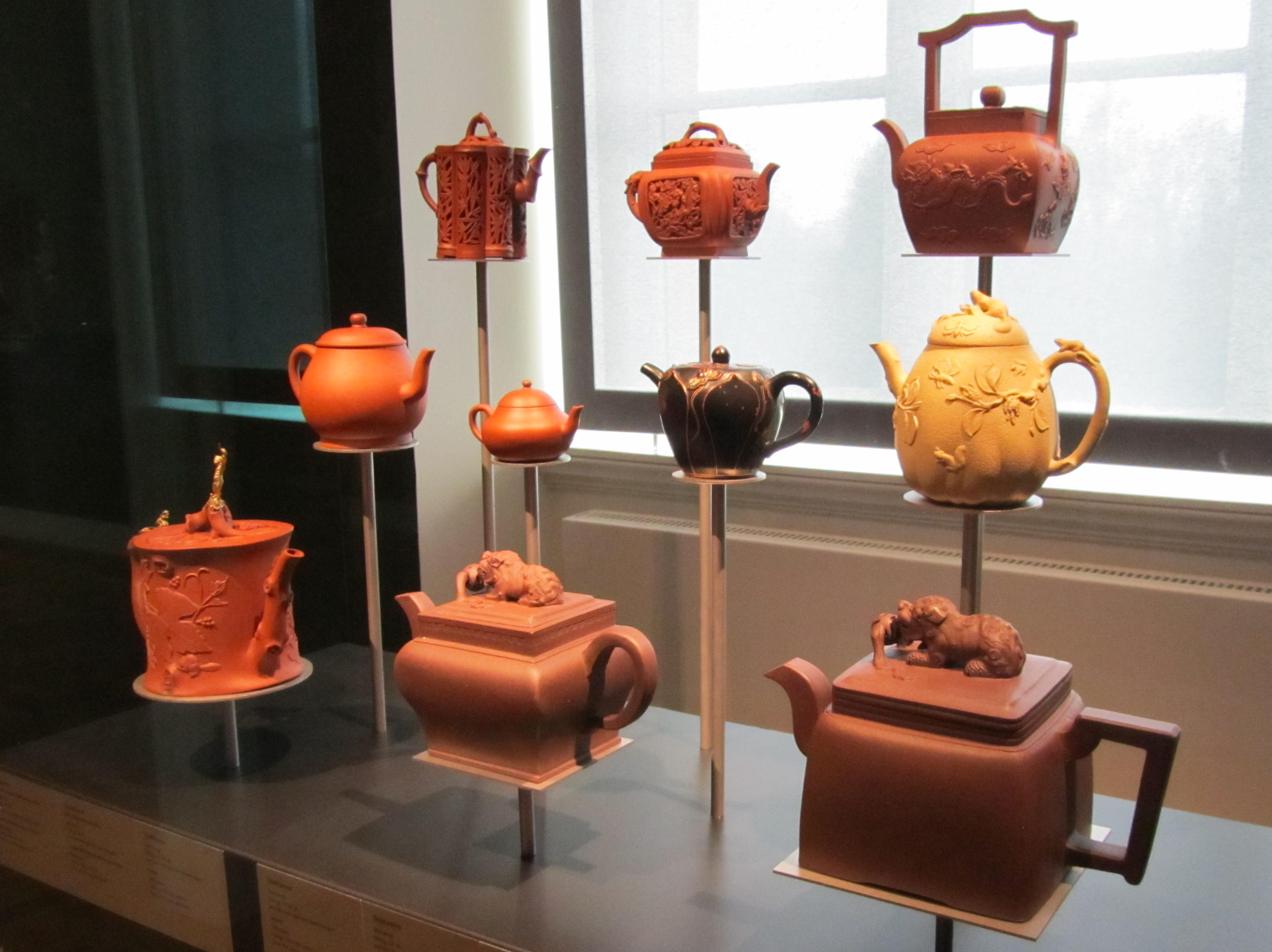
Yixing teapots, 18th century

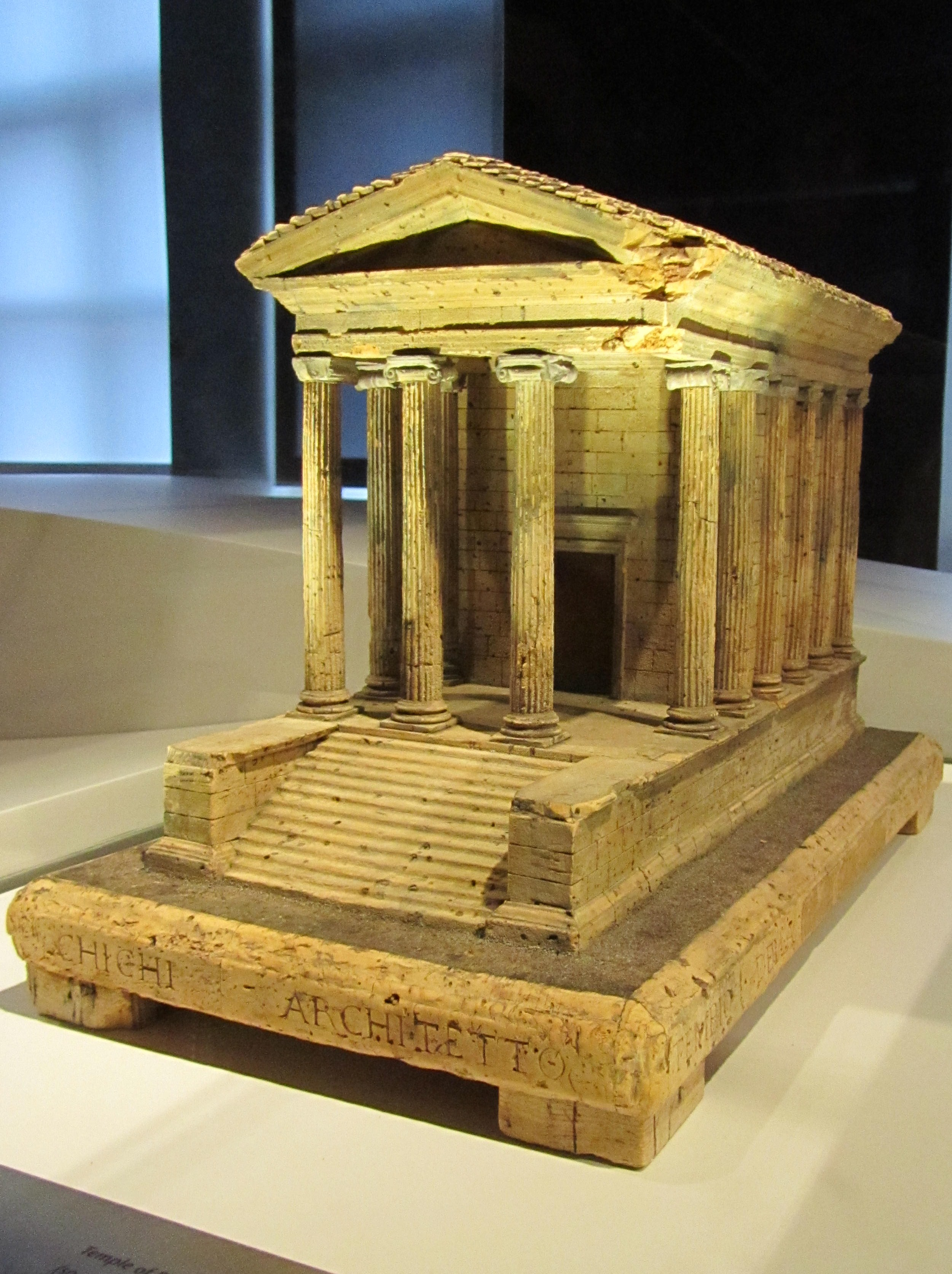
Cork model of the Temple of Portunus, 18th century

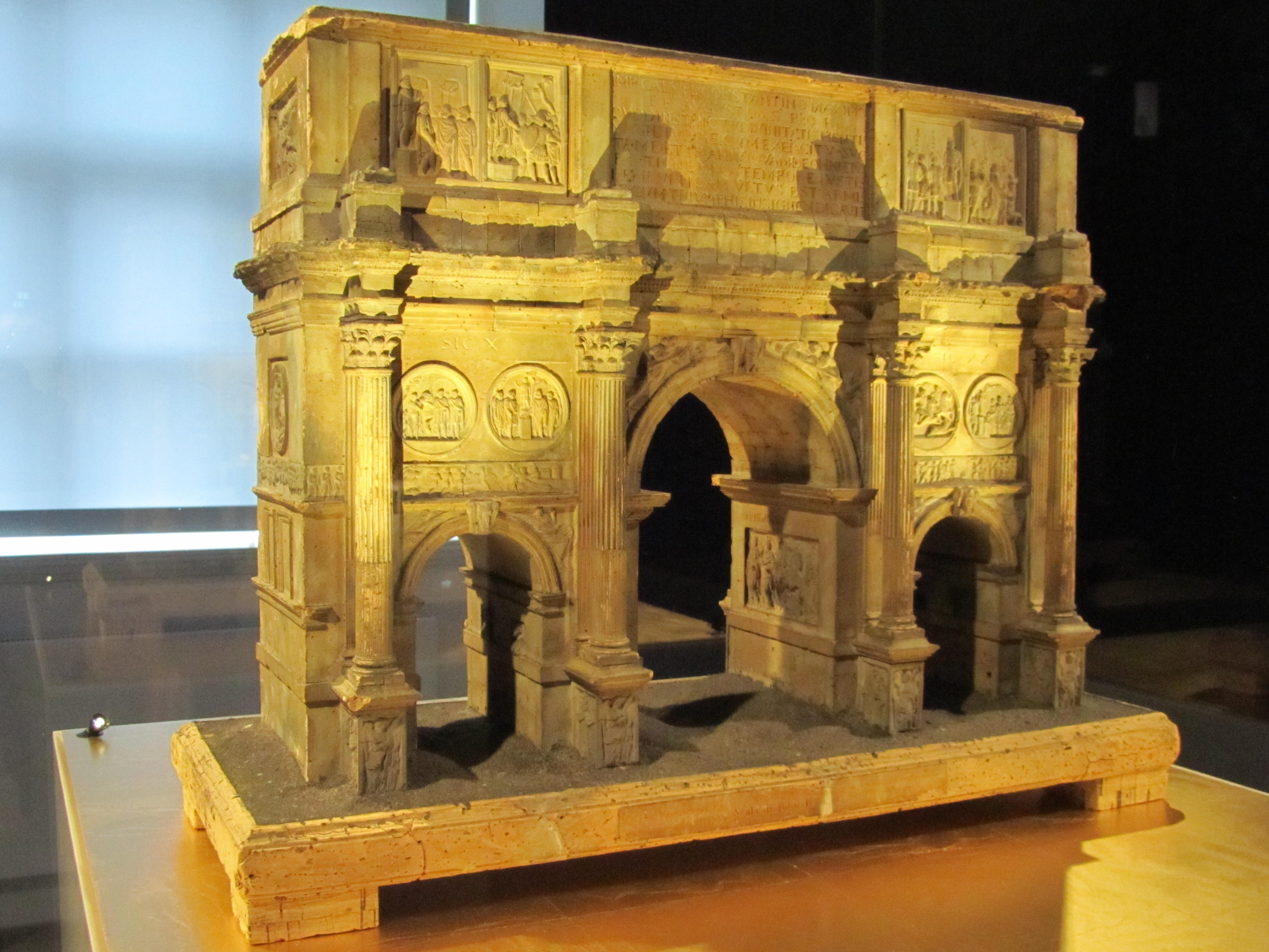
Cork model of the Arch of Constantine, 18th century

== Architecture ==
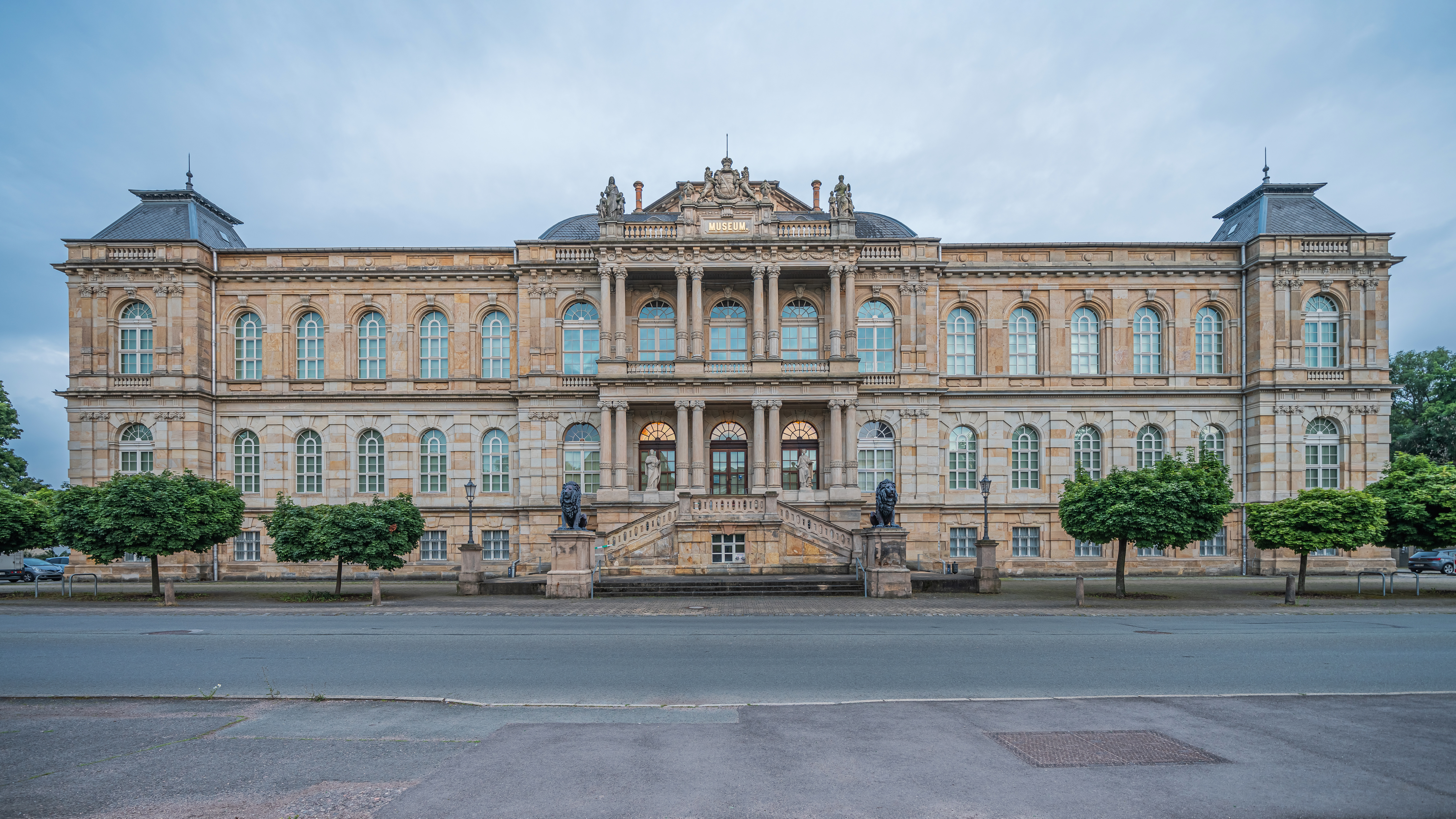
The Museum's street facade

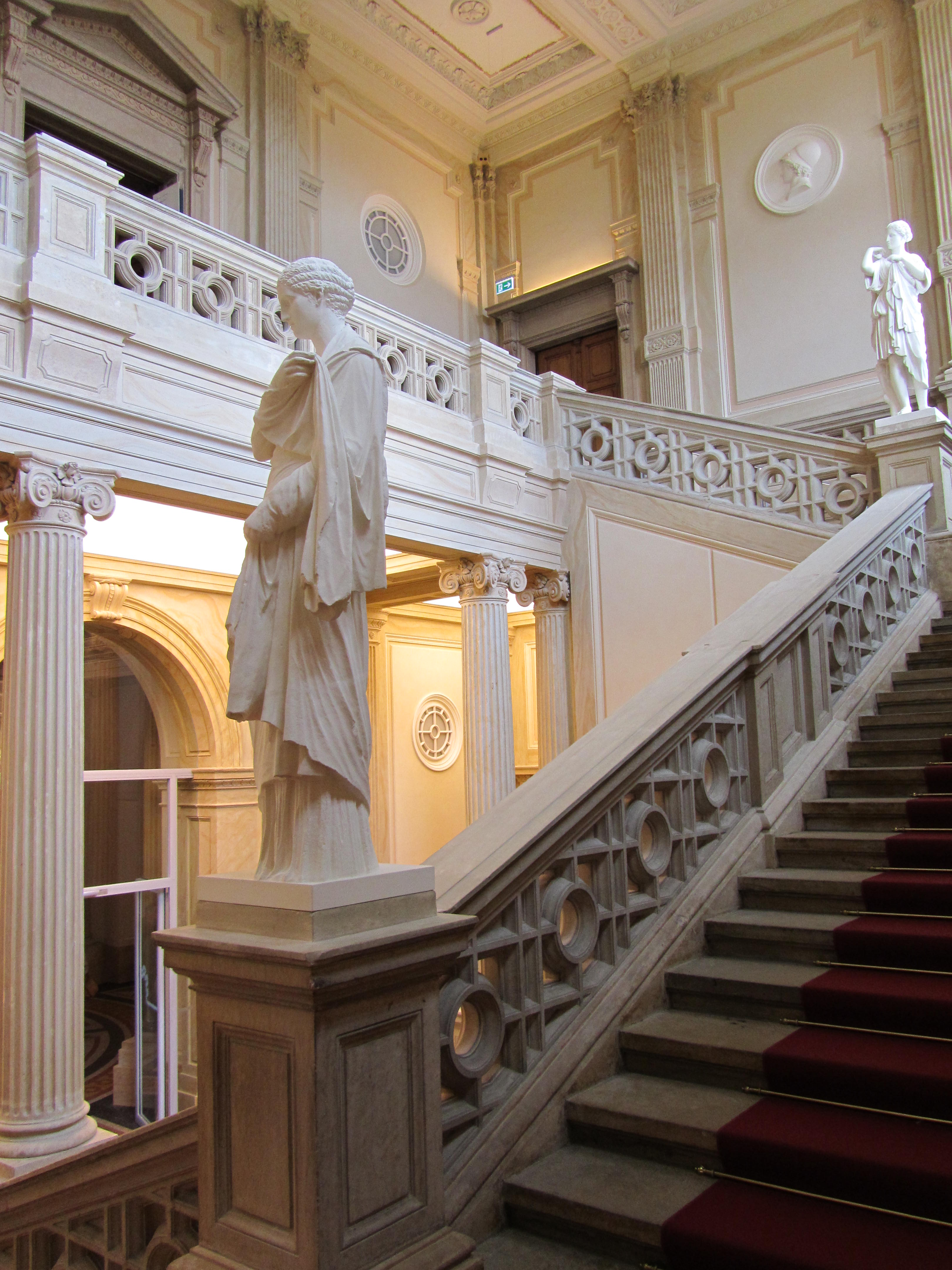
View of a stairwell

The building is mainly made up of Seeberg sandstone, with some stone from Pirna in Saxony. Franz von Neumann based his designs on existing museum buildings built between 1800 and 1850 but also introduced ideas of his own, which in turn became ground-breaking for later buildings. The Palace of Versailles was the main influence on the facade.

The complex is centred on a glass dome over a central octagon (housing a life-size 1882 Christian Behrens statue of Ernst II wearing the robes of a Knight of the Order of the Garter) and the main entrance (with two seated lions on the main staircase by sculptor Franz Melnitzky and two allegorical sandstone statues in the entrance hall), whilst its corners are designed like pavilions. On the corners of the attic are groups of figures symbolizing art and science.

Inside, the path to the halls and cabinets leads through a structured vestibule. Italian marble and a multi-coloured stone mosaic determine the room's overall appearance. In the basement are a series of small cabinets, whilst on the ground floor there are two spacious, light-flooded halls supported by pillars and on the upper floor are halls with skylights filled with cabinets.

== Bibliography ==
- (in German) Martin Eberle: Herzogliches Museum Gotha. Münzkabinett, Kupferstichkabinett, Ostasiatika. Mitteldeutscher Verlag, Halle (Saale) 2013, ISBN 978-3-95462-017-3.
- (in German) Stiftung Schloss Friedenstein Gotha (Hrsg.): Museen der Stiftung Schloss Friedenstein Gotha: Schlossmuseum, Museum der Natur, Museum für Regionalgeschichte und Volkskunde. Deutscher Kunstverlag, München/Berlin 2007, ISBN 978-3-422-06620-5.
- (in German) Wolfgang Zimmermann: Der Bau des Herzoglichen Museums zu Gotha (1864–1879). In: Harald Bachmann, Wener Korn, Helmut Claus, Elisabeth Dobritzsch (ed.s): Herzog Ernst II. von Sachsen-Coburg und Gotha, 1818–1893 und seine Zeit, Jubiläumsschrift im Auftrag der Städte Coburg und Goth. Maro Verlag, Augsburg 1993, ISBN 3-87512-198-8, S. 249–261.
