= Friedrich Kraner =

German teacher (1812–1863)

Friedrich Kraner (15 October 1812, in Eibenstock – 17 January 1863, in Leipzig) was a German schoolteacher and classical philologist.

He studied philology at the University of Leipzig as a pupil of Gottfried Hermann. Afterwards, he worked as a teacher in Annaberg (from 1835), then served as an Oberlehrer (senior instructor) in Meissen (from 1838). In 1857 he was named director of the gymnasium in Zwickau, and in 1862 was appointed rector of the Thomasschule in Leipzig.

== Published works ==
He is best remembered for his scholarly treatment of Julius Caesar's Commentarii de Bello Gallico and Commentarii de Bello Civili. The following are a few of Kraner's noteworthy written efforts:

- Plutarchi Vita Phocionis, 1840 – edition of Plutarch's life of Phocion.
- Hellenica : die Geschichte Griechenlands bis zum peloponnesischen Kriege nach ihren Hauptmomenten in Auszügen aus griechischen Schriftstellern für mittlere Gymnasialclassen, 1842 – Hellenica, the history of Greece up to the Peloponnesian War, etc.
- C. Julii Caesaris Commentarii de bello Gallico, (with a chart of Gaul by Heinrich Kiepert); Leipzig, Wiedmannsche Buchhandlung, 1853
- C. Julii Caesaris Commentarii de bello Civili, Berlin; Weidmann, 1856.
