= Charles Frederick, Grand Duke of Baden =

Charles Frederick
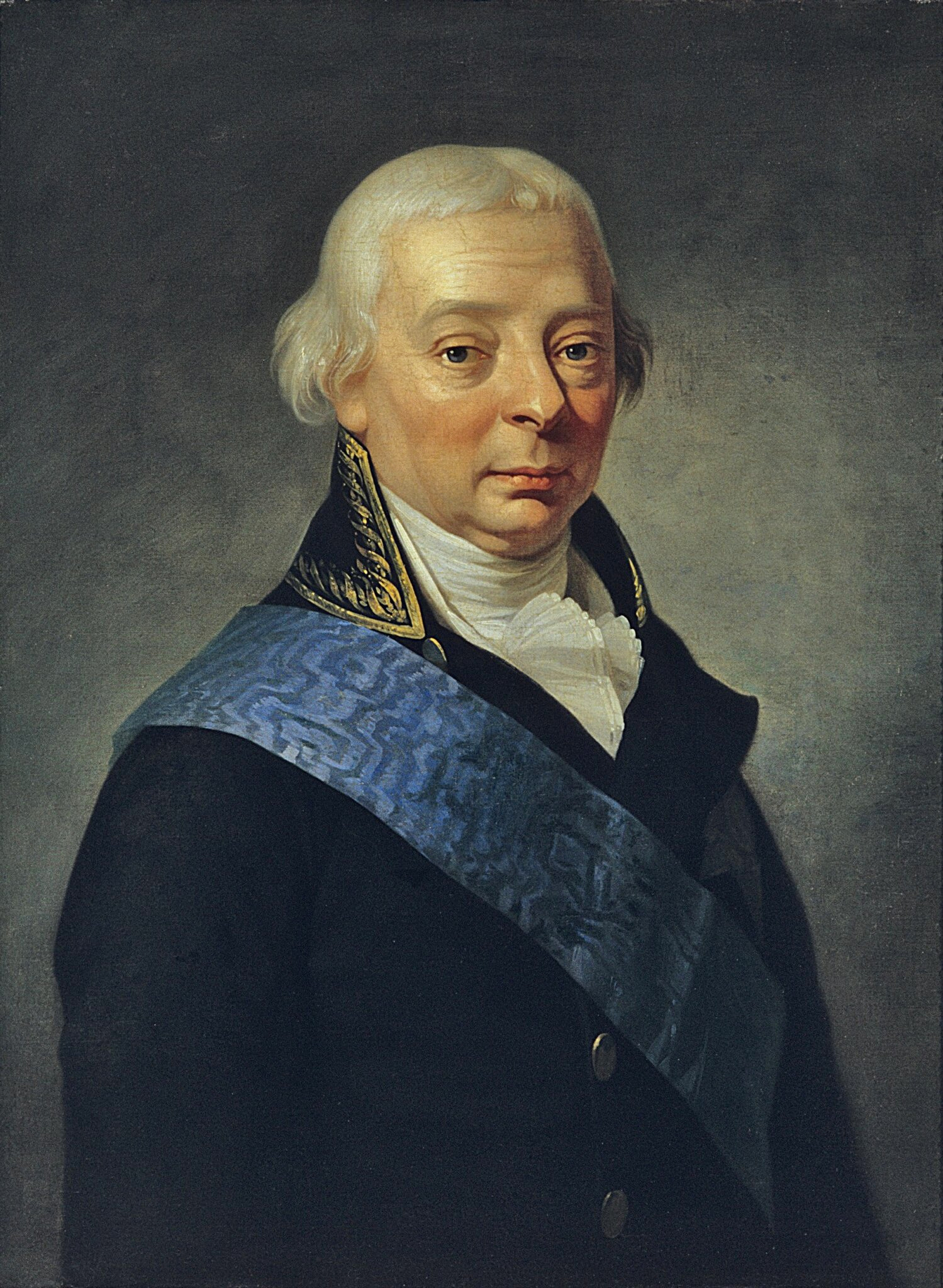

Grand Duke of Baden
- Reign: 25 July 1806 – 10 June 1811
- Successor: Charles

Elector of Baden
- Reign: 27 April 1803 – 6 August 1806

Margrave of Baden (unified)
- Reign: 21 October 1771 – 27 April 1803
- Predecessor: Augustus George, Margrave of Baden-Baden

Margrave of Baden-Durlach
- Reign: 12 May 1738 – 21 October 1771
- Predecessor: Charles III William
- Born: 22 November 1728; Karlsruhe Palace, Margraviate of Baden-Durlach
- Died: 10 June 1811 (aged 82); Karlsruhe, Duchy of Baden
- Spouses: Landgravine Caroline Louise of Hesse-Darmstadt (m. 1751; died 1783) Louise Caroline, Baroness Geyer of Geyersberg (m. 1787)
- Issue: Charles Louis, Hereditary Prince of Baden; Prince Frederick; Louis I, Grand Duke of Baden; Princess Louise Auguste; Leopold, Grand Duke of Baden; Prince William; Prince Frederick Alexander; Princess Amalie; Prince Maximilian
- House: Zähringen
- Father: Frederick, Hereditary Prince of Baden-Durlach
- Mother: Princess Amalia of Nassau-Dietz
- Religion: Lutheran

Charles Frederick (22 November 1728 – 10 June 1811) was Margrave, Elector and later Grand Duke of Baden (initially only Margrave of Baden-Durlach) from 1738 until his death.

== Biography ==
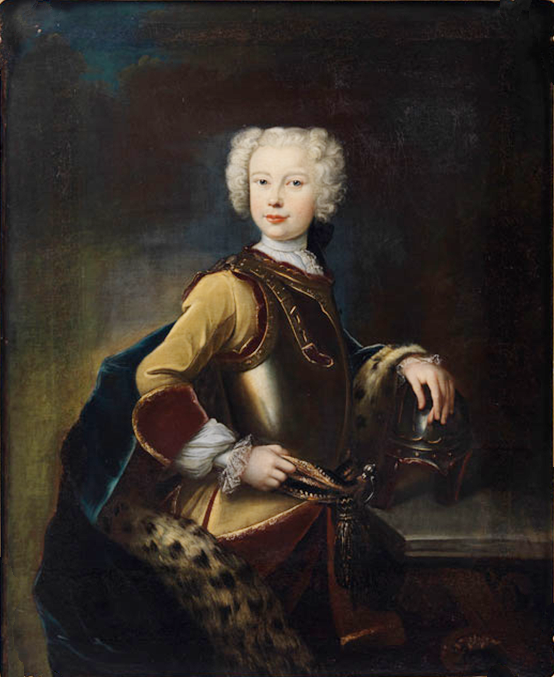
Portrait of Charles Frederick by Philipp Heinrich Kisling, late 1830s/early 1840s

Born at Karlsruhe, he was the son of Hereditary Prince Frederick of Baden-Durlach and Amalia of Nassau-Dietz, daughter of Johan Willem Friso of Nassau-Dietz.

He succeeded his grandfather as Margrave of Baden-Durlach in 1738 and ruled personally from 1746 until 1771, when he inherited the Margraviate of Baden-Baden from the Catholic line of his family. This made him the Protestant ruler of a state that was overwhelmingly Catholic; however, the Imperial Diet permitted this because the Elector of Saxony had converted to Catholicism from Lutheranism and had been permitted to retain control of the Protestant body of the Imperial Diet. Upon inheriting the latter margraviate, the original land of Baden was reunited. He was regarded as a good example of an enlightened despot, supporting schools, universities, jurisprudence, the civil service, the economy, culture, and urban development. He outlawed torture in 1767, and serfdom in 1783. He was elected a Royal Fellow of the Royal Society in 1747.

In 1803, Charles Frederick became Elector of Baden, and in 1806, the first Grand Duke of Baden. Through the politics of minister Sigismund Freiherr von Reitzenstein, Baden acquired the Bishopric of Constance, and the territories of the Bishopric of Basel, the Bishopric of Strassburg, and the Bishopric of Speyer that lay on the right bank of the Rhine, in addition to Breisgau and Ortenau.

In 1806, Baden joined the Confederation of the Rhine.

Together with his architect, Friedrich Weinbrenner, Charles Frederick was responsible for the construction of the handsome suite of classical buildings that distinguish Karlsruhe. He died there in 1811, and was one of the few German rulers to die during the Napoleonic era.

== Marriages and children ==
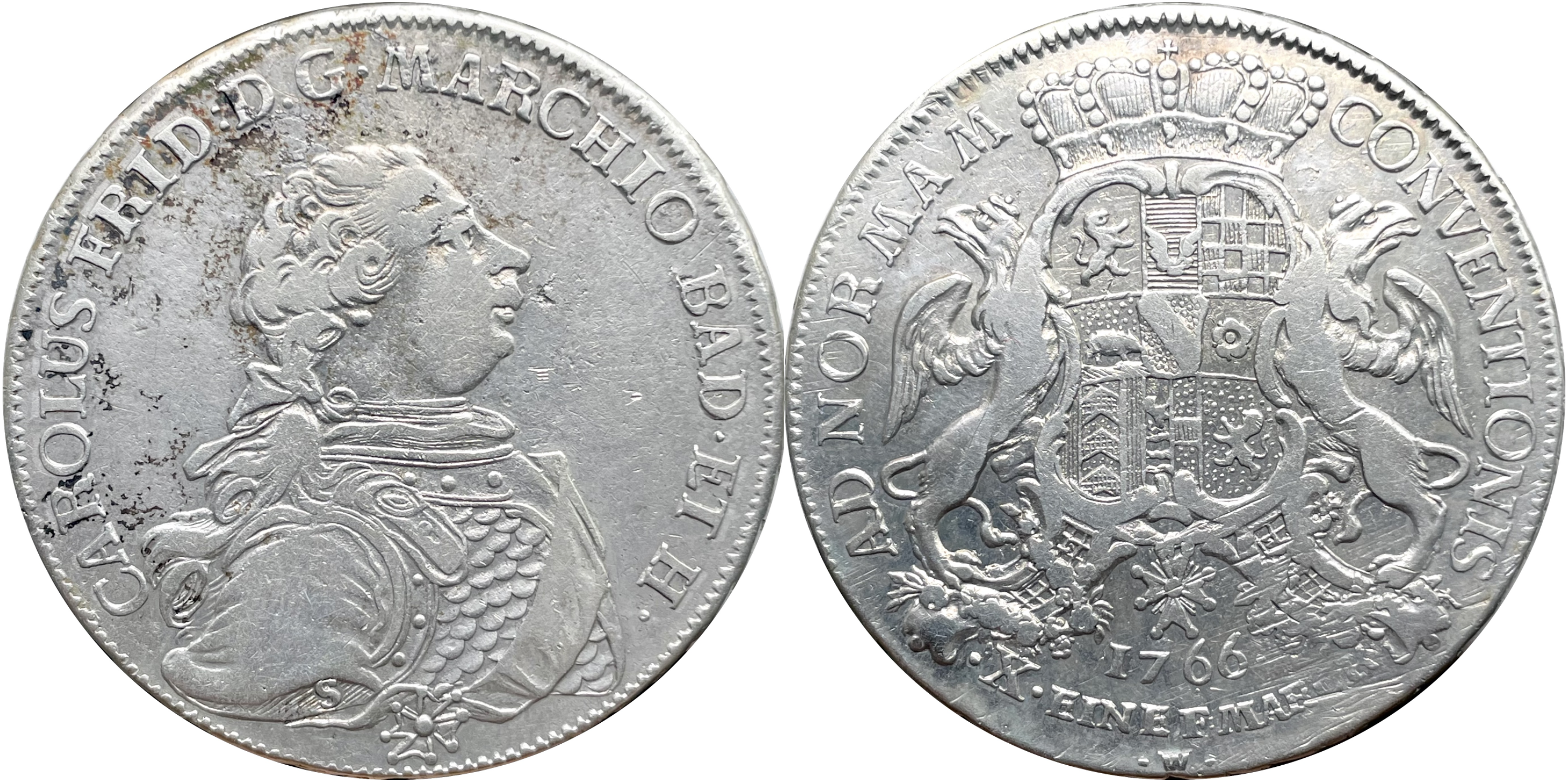
Silver coin: 1 konventionsthaler Karl Friedrich of Baden-Durlach, 1766

Charles Frederick married Caroline Louise of Hesse-Darmstadt, daughter of Louis VIII of Hesse-Darmstadt, on 28 January 1751.

They had five children:

- Charles Louis, Hereditary Prince of Baden (14 February 1755 – 16 December 1801); his son, Charles, succeeded Charles Frederick as Grand Duke upon the latter's death in 1811.
- Prince Frederick of Baden (29 August 1756 – 28 May 1817); married on 9 December 1791 Louise of Nassau-Usingen (16 August 1776 – 19 February 1829), the daughter of Duke Frederick of Nassau-Usingen.
- Prince Louis of Baden (9 February 1763 – 30 March 1830); had three illegitimate children by Katharina Werner, created Countess of Gondelsheim and Langenstein in 1818. Louis succeeded his nephew Charles as Louis I, 3rd Grand Duke in 1818.
- Stillborn son (29 July 1764 – 29 July 1764).
- Princess Louise Auguste of Baden (8 January 1767 – 11 January 1767).

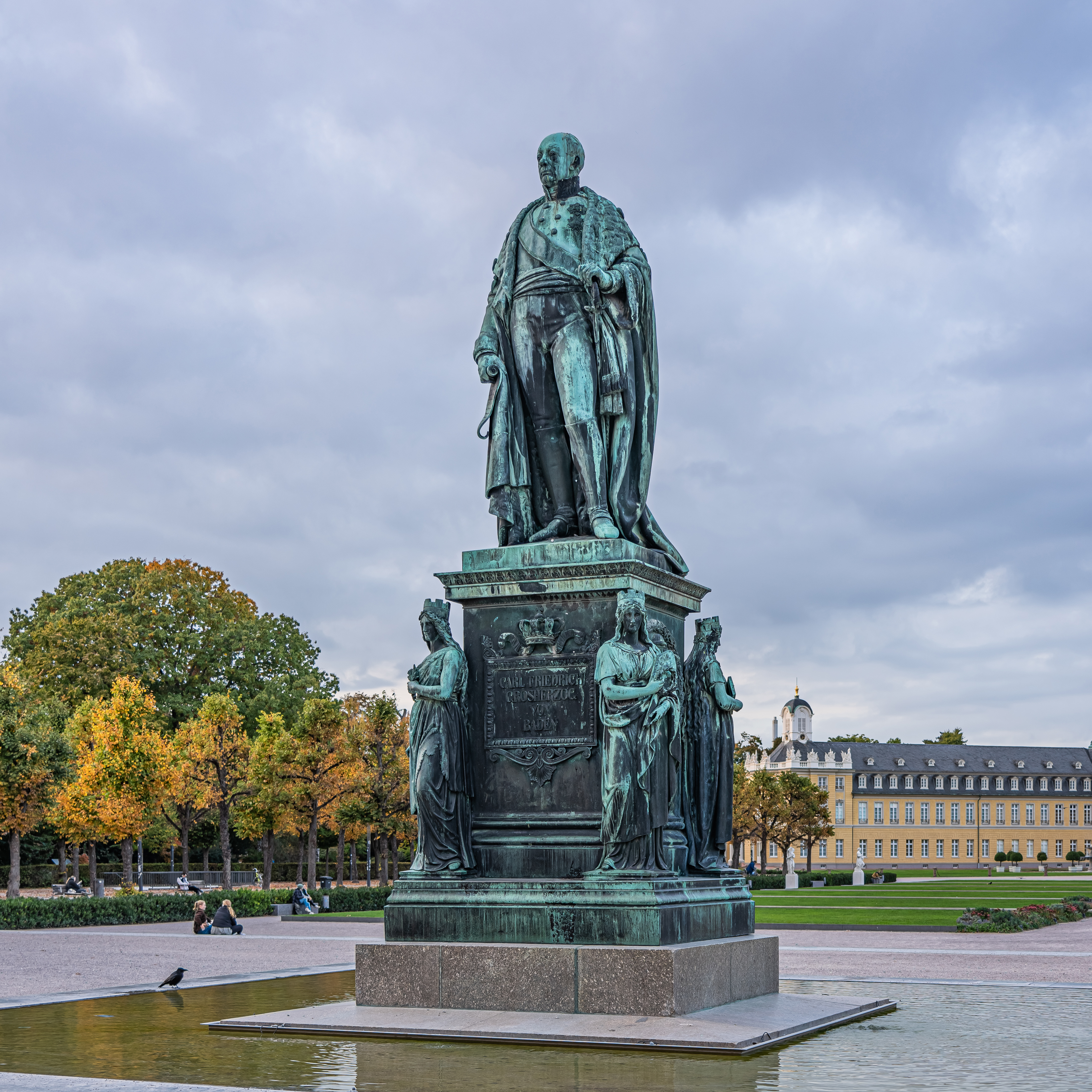
Charles Frederick statue in front of the Karlsruhe Palace (Schloss)

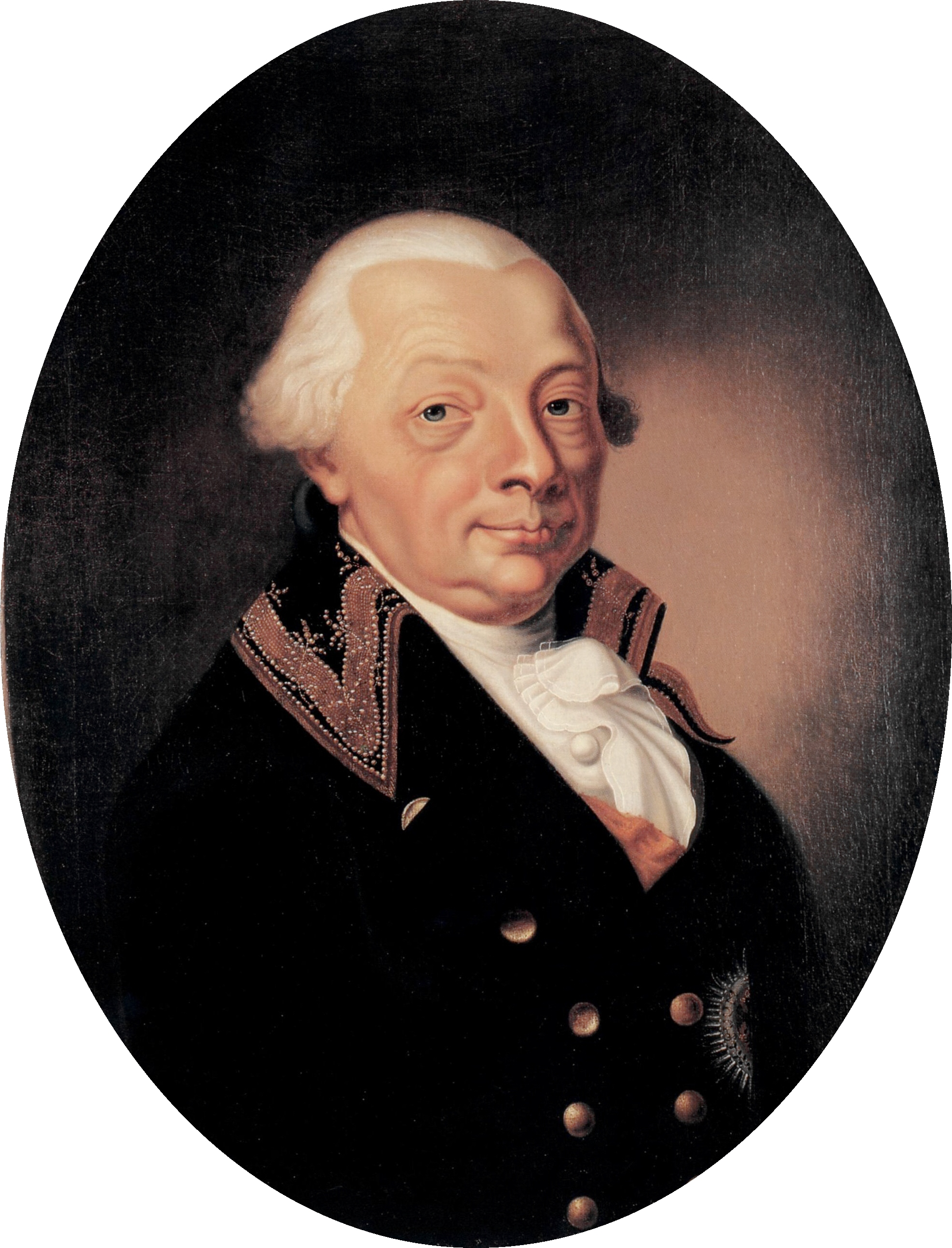
Portrait of Charles Frederick by Johann Ludwig Kisling, 1803

Charles Frederick married Louise Caroline, Baroness Geyer of Geyersberg as his second wife on 24 November 1787. She was the daughter of Lt. Col. Louis Henry Philipp, Baron Geyer of Geyersberg and Maximiliana Christiane, Countess of Sponeck. This was a morganatic marriage, and the children born of it were not eligible to succeed. Louise was created Baroness of Hochberg at the time of her marriage and Countess of Hochberg in 1796; both titles were also borne by them.

They had five children:

- Prince Leopold of Baden (29 August 1790 – 24 April 1852); later succeeded as HRH Leopold I, Grand Duke of Baden. Married on 25 July 1819 in Karlsruhe his half-grandniece, HRH Princess Sophie of Sweden (21 May 1801 – 6 July 1865), eldest daughter of the former King Gustav IV Adolf of Sweden and Frederica of Baden.
- Prince William of Baden (8 April 1792 – 11 October 1859).
- Prince Frederick Alexander of Baden (10 June 1793 – 18 June 1793).
- Princess Amalie of Baden (26 January 1795 – 14 September 1869); married on 19 April 1818 Charles Egon II of Fürstenberg (28 October 1796 – 22 October 1854); their daughter, Princess Pauline von Fürstenberg, was the mother of Princess Margarethe of Hohenlohe-Öhringen (b. Slawentzitz, 27 December 1865 – d. Dresden, 13 June 1940), who was the second wife of Wilhelm, Count of Hohenau (himself the son of Prince Albert of Prussia).
- Prince Maximilian of Baden (8 December 1796 – 6 March 1882).

By 1817, the descendants of Charles Frederick by his first wife were dying out. To prevent Baden from being inherited by the next heir (his brother-in-law King Maximilian I Joseph of Bavaria), the reigning Grand Duke, Charles (grandson of the first Grand Duke), changed the succession law to give the Hochberg family full dynastic rights in Baden. They thus became Princes and Princesses of Baden with the style Grand Ducal Highness, like their elder half-siblings. Their succession rights were reinforced when Baden was granted a constitution in 1818, and recognised by Bavaria and the Great Powers in the Treaty of Frankfurt, 1819. Leopold's descendants ruled the Grand Duchy of Baden until 1918. The current pretenders to the throne of Baden are descendants of Leopold.

Leopold, the eldest son from the second marriage, succeeded as Grand Duke in 1830.

== Ancestry ==
Ancestors of Charles Frederick, Grand Duke of Baden

8. Frederick VII, Margrave of Baden-Durlach
4. Charles III William, Margrave of Baden-Durlach
9. Augusta Marie of Holstein-Gottorp
2. Frederick, Hereditary Prince of Baden-Durlach
10. William Louis, Duke of Württemberg
5. Magdalena Wilhelmine of Württemberg
11. Magdalena Sibylla of Hesse-Darmstadt
1. Charles Frederick, Grand Duke of Baden
12. Henry Casimir II, Prince of Nassau-Dietz
6. John William Friso, Prince of Orange
13. Henriëtte Amalia of Anhalt-Dessau
3. Princess Amalia of Nassau-Dietz
14. Charles I, Landgrave of Hesse-Kassel
7. Landgravine Marie Louise of Hesse-Kassel
15. Maria Amalia of Courland

Charles Frederick, Grand Duke of Baden House of Zähringen Born: 22 November 1728 Died: 10 June 1811
Regnal titles
| Preceded by Charles III | Margrave of Baden-Durlach; 1738–1771 | Reunification of Baden |
| Preceded by Augustus George Simpert | Margrave of Baden-Baden; 1771 | Reunification of Baden |
| Preceded by Himself as Margrave of Baden-Durlach | Margrave of Baden; 1771–1803 | Elevated to electorate |
| New title Electorate established | Elector of Baden; 1803–1806 | Dissolution of the Holy Roman Empire |
| New title Grand Duchy of Baden established | Grand Duke of Baden; 1806–1811 | Succeeded by Charles |
