= List of Württembergish royal consorts =

Royal consorts of Württemberg

The Queen of Württemberg was the queen consort of the ruler of the Kingdom of Württemberg, from its establishment in 1806 to its abolition in 1918. Salic law required all rulers of Württemberg to be male and so there was never a queen regnant of Württemberg.

== Duchess consort of Württemberg, 1495–1803 ==
Picture	Name	Father	Birth	Marriage	Became Duchess	Ceased to be Duchess	Death	Spouse
	Barbara Gonzaga	Ludovico III Gonzaga, Marquis of Mantua (Gonzaga)	11 December 1455	4 June 1474	21 July 1495; Created Duchess	24 February 1496 husband's death	30 May 1503	Eberhard I
	Elisabeth of Brandenburg	Albrecht III Achilles, Elector of Brandenburg (Hohenzollern)	29 October 1451	April/May 1467	24 February 1496 husband's accession	11 June 1498 husband's abdication	28 March 1524	Eberhard II
	Sabina of Bavaria	Albert IV, Duke of Bavaria (Wittelsbach)	24 April 1492	2 March 1511		January 1519 husband's desposition	30 August 1564	Ulrich
Württemberg annexed by Austria 1519–1534.
	Sabina of Bavaria	Albert IV, Duke of Bavaria (Wittelsbach)	24 April 1492	2 March 1511	May 1534 husband's restoration	6 November 1550 husband's death	30 August 1564	Ulrich
	Anna Maria of Brandenburg-Ansbach	George, Margrave of Brandenburg-Ansbach (Hohenzollern)	28 December 1526	24 February 1544	6 November 1550 husband's accession	28 December 1568 husband's death	20 May 1589	Christoph
	Dorothea Ursula of Baden-Durlach	Charles II, Margrave of Baden-Durlach (Zähringen)	20 June 1559	7 November 1575		19 May 1583		Louis III
	Ursula of the Palatinate-Veldenz	George John I, Count Palatine of Veldenz (Wittelsbach)	24 February 1572	10 May 1585		18 August 1593 husband's death	15 February 1635	Louis III
	Sibylla of Anhalt	Joachim Ernest, Prince of Anhalt (Ascania)	28 September 1564	22 May 1581	18 August 1593 husband's accession	29 January 1608 husband's death	26 October 1614	Frederick I
	Barbara Sophie of Brandenburg	Joachim Frederick, Elector of Brandenburg (Hohenzollern)	16 November 1584	5 November 1609		18 July 1628 husband's death	13 February 1636	John Frederick
	Anna Catharina of Salm-Kyrburg	John Casimir, Wildgrave and Rhinegrave of Salm-Kyrburg (Salm-Kyrburg)	27 January 1614	26 February 1637		27 June 1655		Eberhard III
	Maria Dorothea Sophia of Oettingen	Joachim Ernst, Count of Oettingen-Oettingen (Oettingen-Oettingen)	29 December 1639	20 July 1656		2 July 1674 husband's death	29 June 1698	Eberhard III
	Magdalene Sibylle of Hesse-Darmstadt	Louis VI, Landgrave of Hesse-Darmstadt (Hesse)	28 April 1652	6 November 1673	2 July 1674 husband's accession	23 June 1677 husband's death	11 August 1712	William Louis
	Johanna Elisabeth of Baden-Durlach	Frederick VII, Margrave of Baden-Durlach (Zähringen)	3 October 1680	6/16 May 1697		31 October 1733 husband's death	2 July 1757	Eberhard Louis
	Maria Augusta of Thurn and Taxis	Anselm Franz, 2nd Prince of Thurn and Taxis (Thurn and Taxis)	11 August 1706	1 May 1727	31 October 1733 husband's accession	12 March 1737 husband's death	1 February 1756	Charles Alexander
	Elisabeth Fredericka Sophie of Brandenburg-Bayreuth	Frederick, Margrave of Brandenburg-Bayreuth (Hohenzollern)	30 August 1732	26 September 1748		6 April 1780		Charles Eugene
	Franziska, Duchess of Württemberg	Ludwig Wilhelm, Baron Bernerdin zum Pernthurn (Bernerdin zum Pernthurn)	10 January 1748	10/11 January 1785 morganatic marriage	4 June 1790 dynastic recognition	24 October 1793 husband's death	1 January 1811	Charles Eugene
	Sophie Albertine, Duchess of Württemberg	August, Count of Beichlingen (Beichlingen)	15 December 1728	10 August 1762 morganatic marriage	24 October 1793 husband's accession	20 May 1795 husband's death	10 May 1807	Louis Eugene
	Sophia Dorothea of Brandenburg-Schwedt	Frederick William, Margrave of Brandenburg-Schwedt (Hohenzollern)	18 December 1736	2 November 1753	20 May 1795 husband's accession	23 December 1797 husband's death	9 March 1798	Frederick II Eugene
	Charlotte, Princess Royal	George III of the United Kingdom (Hanover)	29 September 1766	18 May 1797	23 December 1797 husband's accession	25 February 1803 elevated from Duchess	5 October 1828	Frederick I

== Electress consort of Württemberg, 1803–1806 ==
Picture	Name	Father	Birth	Marriage	Became Electress	Ceased to be Electress	Death	Spouse
	Charlotte, Princess Royal	George III of the United Kingdom (Hanover)	29 September 1766	18 May 1797	25 February 1803 elevated from Duchess	1 January 1806 elevated from Electress	5 October 1828	Frederick I

== Queen consort of Württemberg, 1806–1918 ==
Picture	Name	Father	Birth	Marriage	Became Queen	Ceased to be Queen	Death	Spouse
	Charlotte, Princess Royal	George III of the United Kingdom (Hanover)	29 September 1766	18 May 1797	1 January 1806 elevated from Electress	30 October 1816 husband's death	5 October 1828	Frederick I
	Catherine Pavlovna of Russia	Paul I of Russia (Holstein-Gottorp-Romanov)	10 May 1788	24 January 1816	30 October 1816 husband's accession	19 January 1819		William I
	Pauline Therese of Württemberg	Duke Louis of Württemberg (Württemberg)	4 September 1800	15 April 1820		25 June 1864 husband's death	10 May 1873	William I
	Olga Nikolaevna of Russia	Nicholas I of Russia (Holstein-Gottorp-Romanov)	11 September 1822	13 July 1848	25 June 1864 husband's accession	6 October 1891 husband's death	30 October 1892	Charles I
	Charlotte of Schaumburg-Lippe	Prince William of Schaumburg-Lippe (Schaumburg-Lippe)	10 October 1864	8 April 1886	6 October 1891 husband's accession	30 November 1918 husband's abdication	16 July 1946	William II
