= Johanna Elisabeth of Baden-Durlach =

Duchess consort of Württemberg from 1697 to 1733

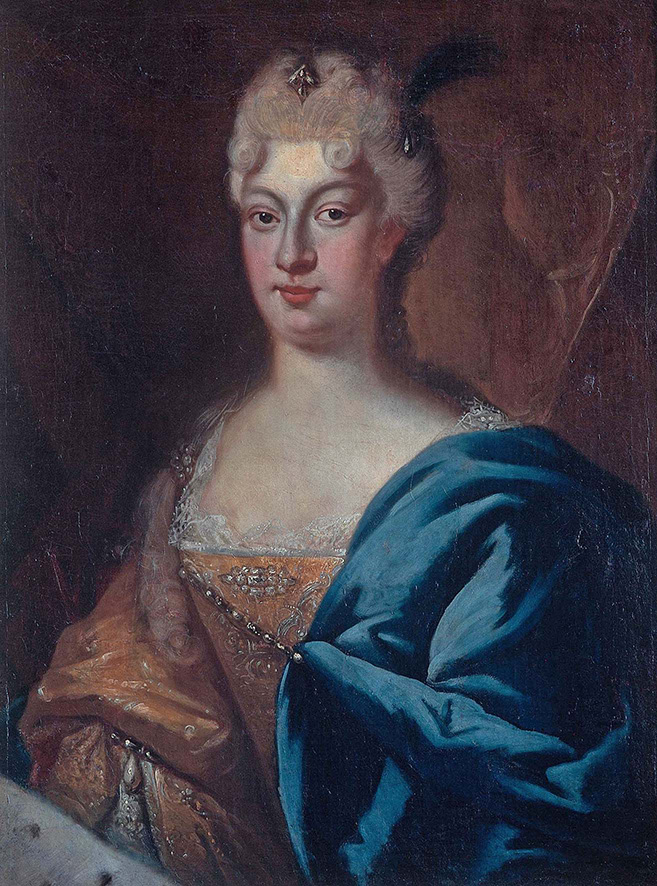

Duchess consort of Württemberg
- Tenure: 6-16 May 1697 – 31 October 1733
- Born: 3 October 1680; Karlsburg Castle, Durlach
- Died: 2 July 1757 (aged 76); Schloss Stetten im Remstal
- Spouse: Eberhard Ludwig, Duke of Württemberg (m. 1697; died 1733)
- Issue: Friedrich Ludwig, Hereditary Prince of Württemberg
- House: Zähringen
- Father: Margrave Frederick Magnus of Baden-Durlach
- Mother: Augusta Marie of Holstein-Gottorp

Johanna Elisabeth of Baden-Durlach (3 October 1680 – 2 July 1757), was a Duchess of Württemberg by marriage.

== Marriage ==
Johanna of Baden-Durlach was born in the Karlsberg, Durlach, the third child of Friedrich VII Magnus, Margrave of Baden-Durlach (1647–1709) and his wife Auguste Marie of Holstein-Gottorp (1649–1728).

In 1697, she was married in Baden-Wurttemberg in a double-wedding to Duke Eberhard Ludwig of Württemberg (1676–1733). His parents were Duke Wilhelm Ludwig of Württemberg and Magdalena Sibylla of Hesse-Darmstadt. The couple tied the two leading Lutheran dynasties of southern Germany together. Joanna's marriage was celebrated in Switzerland, where Baden's court stayed in exile due to repeated French invasions. Two months later in Stuttgart, the marriage of Eberhard Ludwig's sister, Magdalene Wilhelmine and the crown prince and later Margrave Charles III Wilhelm of Baden-Durlach was celebrated. Eberhard paid little attention to his new wife; allegedly he only married her in order to be near one of Joanna's ladies-in-waiting.

== Separation ==
After a son, Crown Prince Friedrich Ludwig (1698–1731), had been born in the first year of marriage, the couple lived largely separated. Through his military career Eberhard Ludwig initially stayed rarely in Stuttgart. In 1704, he took part in the Battle of Blenheim, and was later appointed commander of the Army of the Rhine. In 1707, he became Field Marshal of the Swabian troops in the War of Spanish Succession. It was important for him to command a standing army and a great role model and lead to an absolutist French state with a brilliant court. Johanna Elisabeth clung on to Pietist ideas of morality, with which she had been brought up, and stayed in the old castle in Stuttgart.

== The Grävenitz affair ==
Eberhard Ludwig of Württemberg was the first Duke who lived openly with a mistress, Wilhelmine von Grävenitz (1686–1744). His morganatic marriage to her 1707 was considered a scandal. On the application of Johanna Elisabeth to Holy Roman Emperor Charles VI, the bigamous marriage had to be dissolved and Grävenitz was sent into exile in Switzerland.

Her spouse returned in 1710 when Wilhelmine of Grävenitz, through a sham marriage to Hofmeister Count von Würben, was able to return to Württemberg as well. They lived largely in Ludwigsburg. In 1718, the residence was also officially moved to Ludwigsburg. Johanna Elisabeth, meanwhile, continued to live in the Old Palace in Stuttgart. She refused, however, to file for divorce, and the marriage was not dissolved.

The early death of Prince Friedrich Ludwig in 1731 threatened to move Württemberg to a Catholic secondary line. Because of this danger, Duke Eberhard Ludwig broke his connection to Wilhelmine of Grävenitz and hoped to conceive an heir from his legitimate and long-ignored wife, Johanna Elisabeth. The advanced age of the couple and the imminent death of the Duke on 31 October 1733, however, thwarted these efforts.

Johanna Elizabeth survived her husband by more than twenty years. She lived as a widow at Kirchheim Castle, and died in Schloss Stetten, Stetten in the Rems Valley. She was buried in the Ludwigsburg Castle Church.

== Children ==
- Friedrich Ludwig, Hereditary Prince of Württemberg (1698–1731); married, in 1716, Henrietta Maria of Brandenburg-Schwedt (1702–1782).

Royal titles
| Preceded by Magdalena Sibylla of Hesse-Darmstadt | Duchess consort of Württemberg; 1697–1733 | Succeeded by Princess Maria Augusta of Thurn and Taxis |
