= Henrietta Maria of Brandenburg-Schwedt =

Hereditary Princess of Württemberg (1702–1782)

- Hereditary Princess of Württemberg
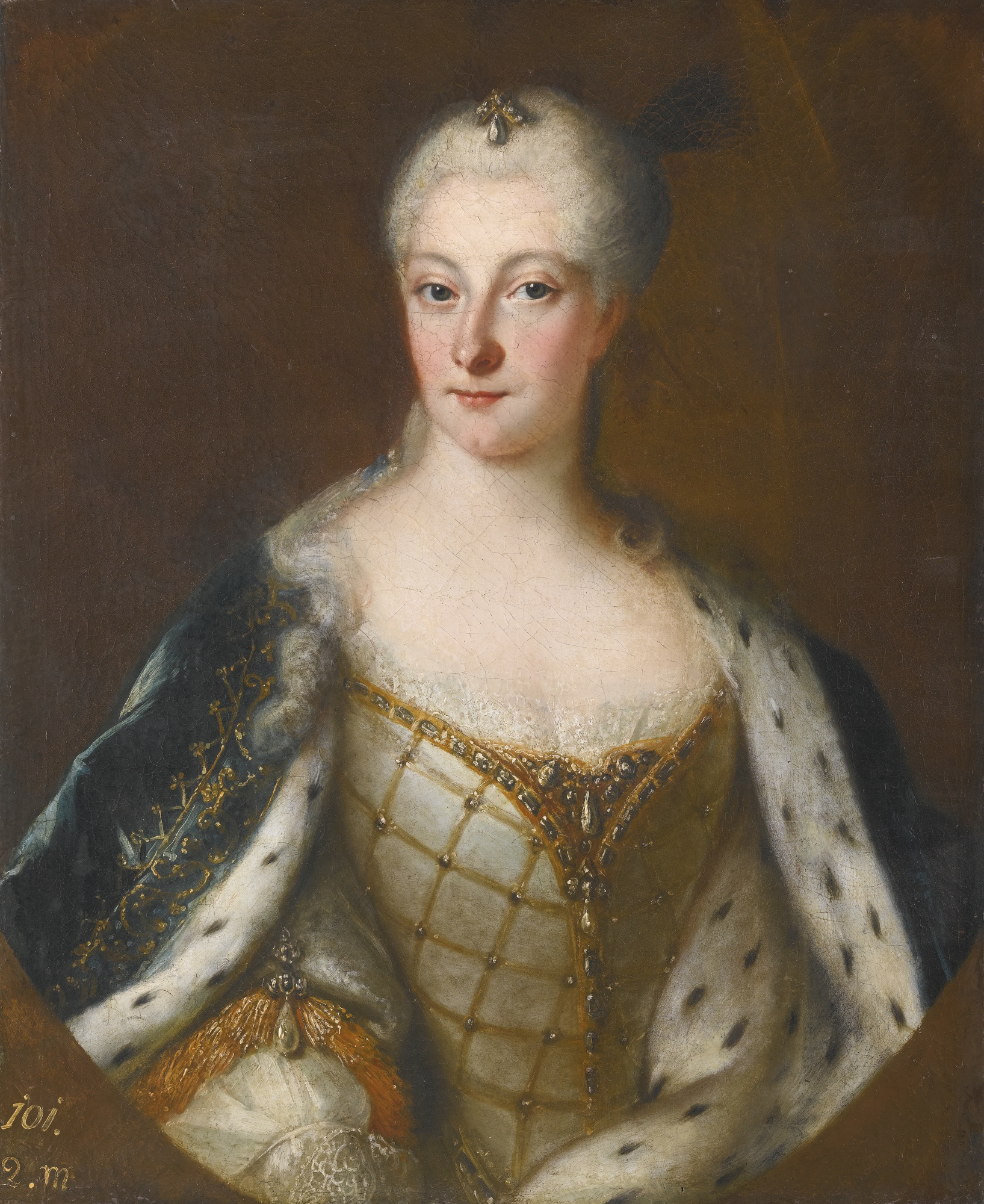
- Born: 2 March 1702 probably Berlin
- Died: 7 May 1782 (aged 80); Köpenick
- Burial: Crypt in the church of Köpenick Palace
- Spouse: Frederick Louis of Württemberg
- Issue: Duchess Louise Frederica of Württemberg
- House: Hohenzollern
- Father: Philip William, Margrave of Brandenburg-Schwedt
- Mother: Princess Johanna Charlotte of Anhalt-Dessau

Henriette Maria of Brandenburg-Schwedt (2 March 1702 – 7 May 1782) was a granddaughter of the "Great Elector" Frederick William of Brandenburg. She was the daughter of Philip William, Margrave of Brandenburg-Schwedt, the eldest son of the elector's second marriage with Sophia Dorothea of Schleswig-Holstein-Sonderburg-Glücksburg. Her mother was Johanna Charlotte, the daughter of Prince John George II, Prince of Anhalt-Dessau.

== Life ==
She married on 8 December 1716 in Berlin to Hereditary Prince Frederick Louis of Württemberg, the only son of Duke Eberhard Louis of Württemberg. The marriage produced two children:

- Eberhard Frederick (1718-1719)
- Louise Frederica (1721-1791), married Frederick II, Duke of Mecklenburg-Schwerin.

Henrietta Maria died on 7 May 1782, aged 80, and was buried in the crypt below the church of Köpenick Palace, where she had spent her years of widowhood. Her daughter arranged for a black marble plate in the crypt to commemorate her mother. In the 1960s, the coffin was cremated, with permission of the Hohenzollern family, and the formerly open-ended crypt (as described by Fontane) was walled off. Her urn was buried below the black marble plate.
