= Christopher of Baden-Durlach =

German prince (1684–1723)

Christopher
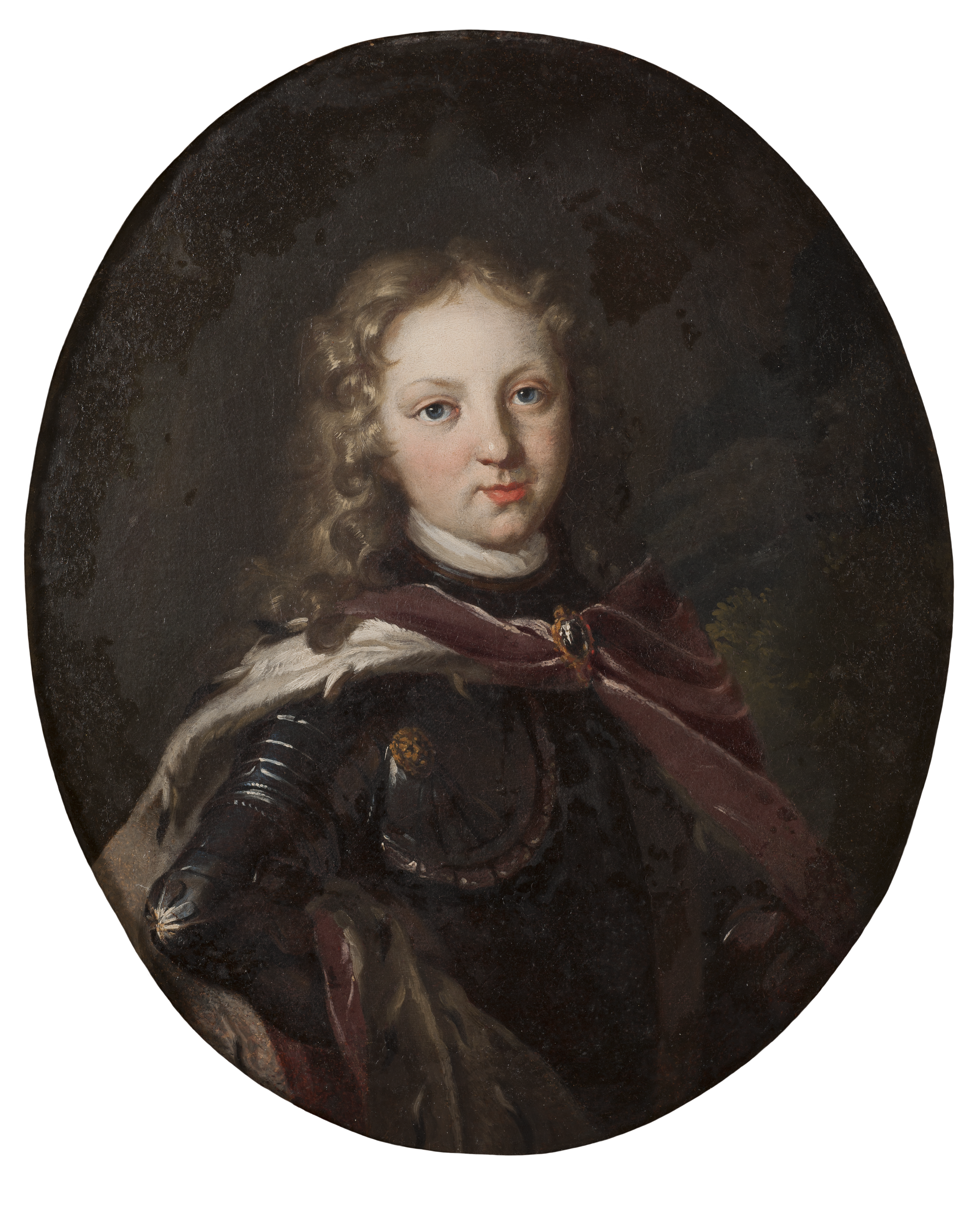
- Portrait by unknown, 1696
- Born: 9 October 1684; Karlsburg Castle, Durlach
- Died: 2 May 1723 (aged 38); Karlsruhe
- Spouse: Marie Christine Felizitas of Leiningen-Dagsburg-Falkenburg-Heidesheim
- Issue: Charles August of Baden-Durlach; Charles William Eugene of Baden-Durlach; Christopher of Baden-Durlach
- Father: Margrave Frederick Magnus of Baden-Durlach
- Mother: Augusta of Schleswig-Holstein-Gottorf

Christopher of Baden-Durlach (9 October 1684, Karlsburg Castle, Durlach – 2 May 1723, Karlsruhe) was Prince and (titular) Margrave of Baden-Durlach.

Christopher was the second son of Margrave Frederick VII Magnus of Baden-Durlach and Augusta Marie of Holstein-Gottorp (born February 6, 1649 – † April 25, 1728), daughter of the Duke Frederick III of Holstein-Gottorp. He was the brother of the ruling Margrave Charles III William, who reigned from 1709 till 1738.

== Marriage and descendants ==
On 4 December 1711, Christopher of Baden-Durlach married with Marie Christine Felizitas (December 30, 1692 – June 3, 1734), a daughter of Johann Karl August, Count of Leiningen-Dagsburg-Falkenburg-Heidesheim and Countess Johanna Magdalene of Hanau-Lichtenberg. The couple had the following children:

- Karl August (November 14, 1712 – September 30, 1786), later ruler of Baden-Durlach (guardianship government for Charles Frederick); married Juliane Schmid (later Baroness von Ehrenberg)
- Charles William Eugene (November 3, 1713 – May 9, 1783), had a military career; from 1743 he was a member of the guardianship authorities (guardianship government for Charles Frederick) of Baden-Durlach with his brother.
- Christopher (June 5, 1717 – December 18, 1789), married on 28 November 1779 Katharina Höllischer, created Baroness von Freydorf (born June 26, 1745 – died 23 July 1811)

After Christopher's early death, his widow married Duke John William III of Saxe-Eisenach in 1727. She was his fourth wife.

Since two of his sons married morganatically and one remained single, this branch of the family could not contribute to the preservation of the House of Baden-Durlach, when the conflicts began over the legitimacy of the descendants of Grand Duke Charles Frederick from the morganatic marriage to Luise Caroline Geyer von Geyersberg.

== See also ==
- List of rulers of Baden
