= Duchess Louise Frederica of Württemberg =

German noblewoman

Louise Frederica
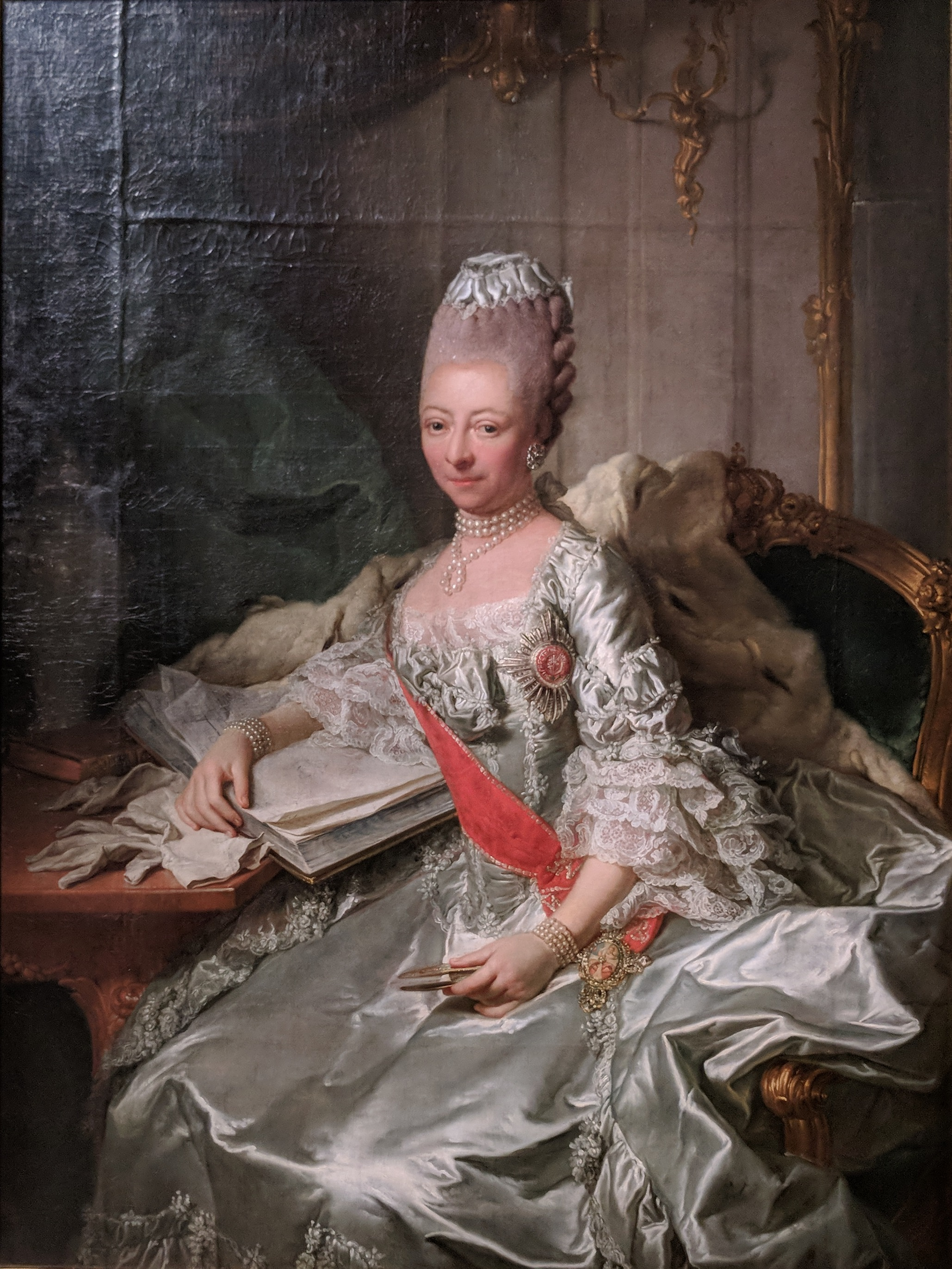

Duchess consort of Mecklenburg-Schwerin
- Tenure: 30 May 1756 – 21 April 1785
- Born: 3 February 1722; Stuttgart
- Died: 2 August 1791 (aged 69)
- Spouse: Frederick II, Duke of Mecklenburg-Schwerin (m. 1746; died 1785)
- House: Württemberg
- Father: Friedrich Ludwig, Hereditary Prince of Württemberg
- Mother: Henrietta Maria of Brandenburg-Schwedt
- Religion: Lutheranism

Duchess Louise Frederica of Württemberg (3 February 1722 – 2 August 1791) was a Duchess consort of Mecklenburg-Schwerin. She was the daughter of Frederick Louis, Hereditary Prince of Württemberg and Margravine Henrietta Maria of Brandenburg-Schwedt. She married Frederick II, Duke of Mecklenburg-Schwerin on 2 March 1746. They had no children.

Royal titles
| Vacant Title last held by Duchess Gustave Caroline of Mecklenburg-Strelitz | Duchess consort of Mecklenburg-Schwerin; 1756–1785 | Vacant Title next held by Princess Louise of Saxe-Gotha-Altenburg (1756–1808) |
