= Augusta Marie of Holstein-Gottorp =

German noblewoman (1649–1728)

Augusta Marie
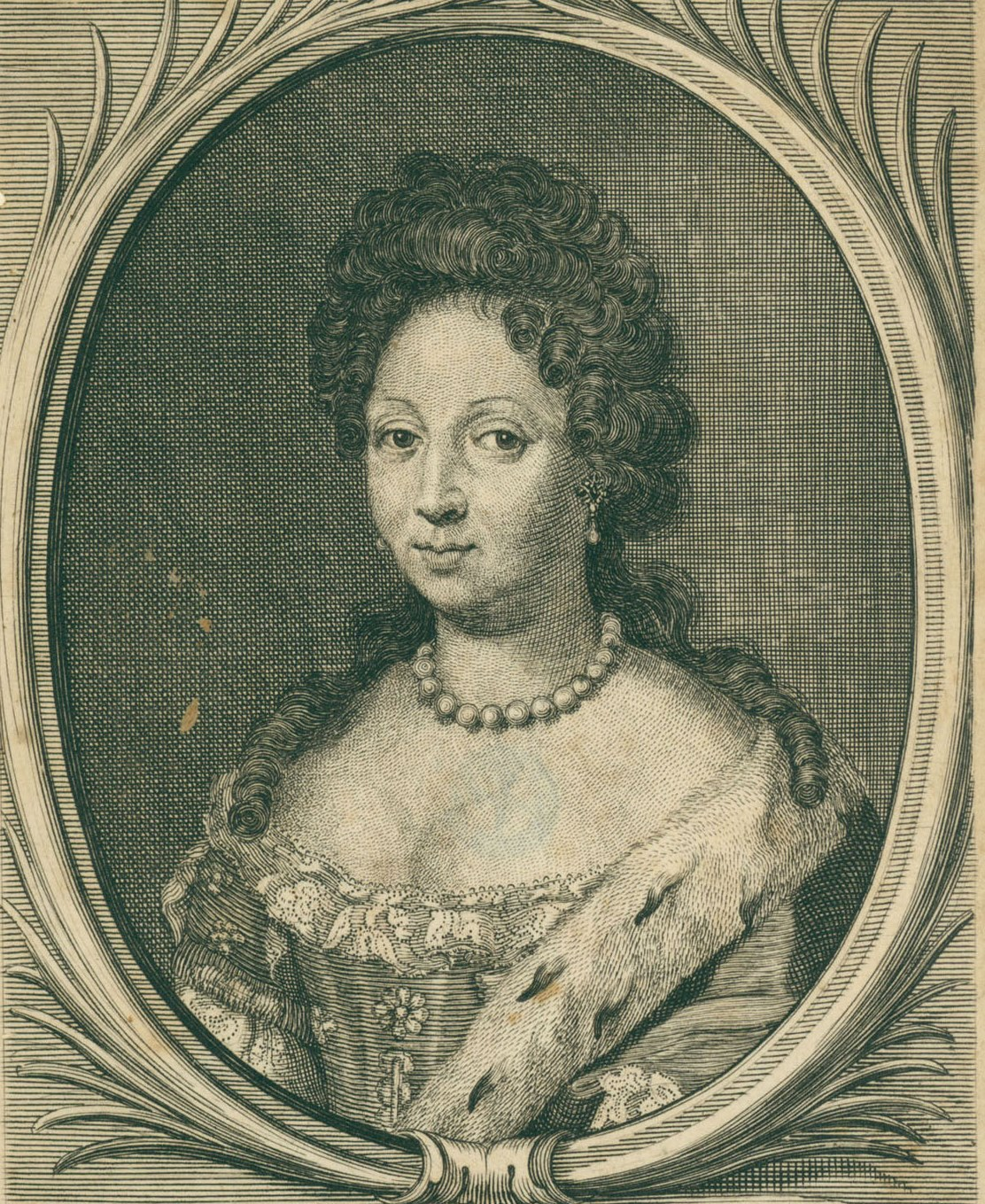
- Engraving by Johann Georg Seiller after Johann Rudolf Huber, c. 1697
- Born: 6 February 1649; Gottorf Castle
- Died: 25 April 1728 (aged 79); Augustenburg Castle in Grötzingen
- Spouse: Frederick VII, Margrave of Baden-Durlach (m. 1670; died 1709)
- Issue Detail: Catherine, Countess of Leiningen-Dagsburg-Hartenburg; Charles III William, Margrave of Baden-Durlach; Johanna Elisabeth, Duchess of Württemberg; Albertine Frederica, Princess of Eutin; Prince Christopher
- House: Holstein-Gottorp (by birth); Zähringen (by marriage)
- Father: Frederick III, Duke of Holstein-Gottorp
- Mother: Duchess Marie Elisabeth of Saxony

Augusta Marie of Holstein-Gottorp (6 February 1649 – 25 April 1728) was a German noblewoman who became a Margravine of Baden-Durlach by virtue of marriage. Born into the House of Holstein-Gottorp, she was a daughter of Frederick III, Duke of Holstein-Gottorp and Duchess Marie Elisabeth of Saxony. She was known as the castle builder for her role in building Schloss Augustenburg in Grötzingen, Karlsruhe.

== Personal life ==
Augusta Marie married Frederick VII, Margrave of Baden-Durlach on 15 May 1670 in Husum. They had eleven children of which only five survived early childhood:

- Frederick Magnus (13 January 1672 – 24 February 1672), who died in infancy
- Frederica Augusta (21 June 1673 – 24 July 1674), who died in early childhood
- Christina Sophia (17 December 1674 – 22 January 1676), who died in early childhood
- Klaudia Magdalene Elisabeth (15 November 1675 – 18 April 1676), who died in infancy
- Catherine (10 October 1677 – 11 August 1746), who married the Count Johann Friedrich von Leiningen-Dagsburg-Hardenburg in 1701
- Charles III William, Margrave of Baden-Durlach (17 January 1679 – 12 May 1738), who married Magdalena Wilhelmine of Württemberg
- Johanna Elisabeth of Baden-Durlach (3 October 1680 – 2 July 1757), who married Eberhard Louis, Duke of Württemberg in 1697
- Albertine Frederica (3 July 1682 – 22 December 1755), who married Christian August of Holstein-Gottorp, Prince of Eutin in 1704
- Christopher of Baden-Durlach (9 October 1684 – 2 May 1723), who married Marie Christine Felizitas zu Leiningen-Dagsburg-Falkenburg-Heidesheim
- Charlotte Sophia (1 March 1686 – 5 October 1689), who died in early childhood
- Marie Anna (9 July 1688 – 8 March 1689), who died in infancy

== Ancestors ==
Ancestors of Augusta Marie of Holstein-Gottorp

8. Adolf, Duke of Holstein-Gottorp
4. John Adolf, Duke of Holstein-Gottorp
9. Christine of Hesse
2. Frederick III, Duke of Holstein-Gottorp
10. Frederick II of Denmark
5. Augusta of Denmark
11. Sophie of Mecklenburg-Güstrow
1. Augusta Marie of Holstein-Gottorp
12. Christian I, Elector of Saxony
6. John George I, Elector of Saxony
13. Sophie of Brandenburg
3. Duchess Marie Elisabeth of Saxony
14. Albert Frederick, Duke of Prussia
7. Magdalena Sibylle of Prussia
15. Marie Eleonore of Cleves

Augusta Marie of Holstein-Gottorp House of Holstein-Gottorp Born: 6 February 1649 Died: 25 April 1728
Royal titles
Preceded by Christina Magdalena of the Palatinate-Zweibrücken	Margavine consort of Baden-Durlach; 1677–1709	Succeeded by Magdalena Wilhelmine of Württemberg
