= Wilhelmine von Grävenitz =

German noblewoman (1684–1744)

- Countess of Würben
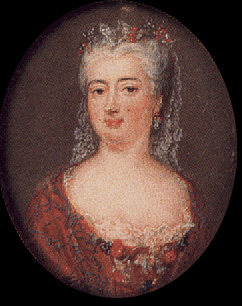
- 1721 portrait by C.E. de Quitter
- Full name: Christine Wilhelmine Friederike von Grävenitz
- Born: February 4, 1684; Schwerin
- Died: October 21, 1744 (aged 60); Berlin
- Noble family: Grävenitz

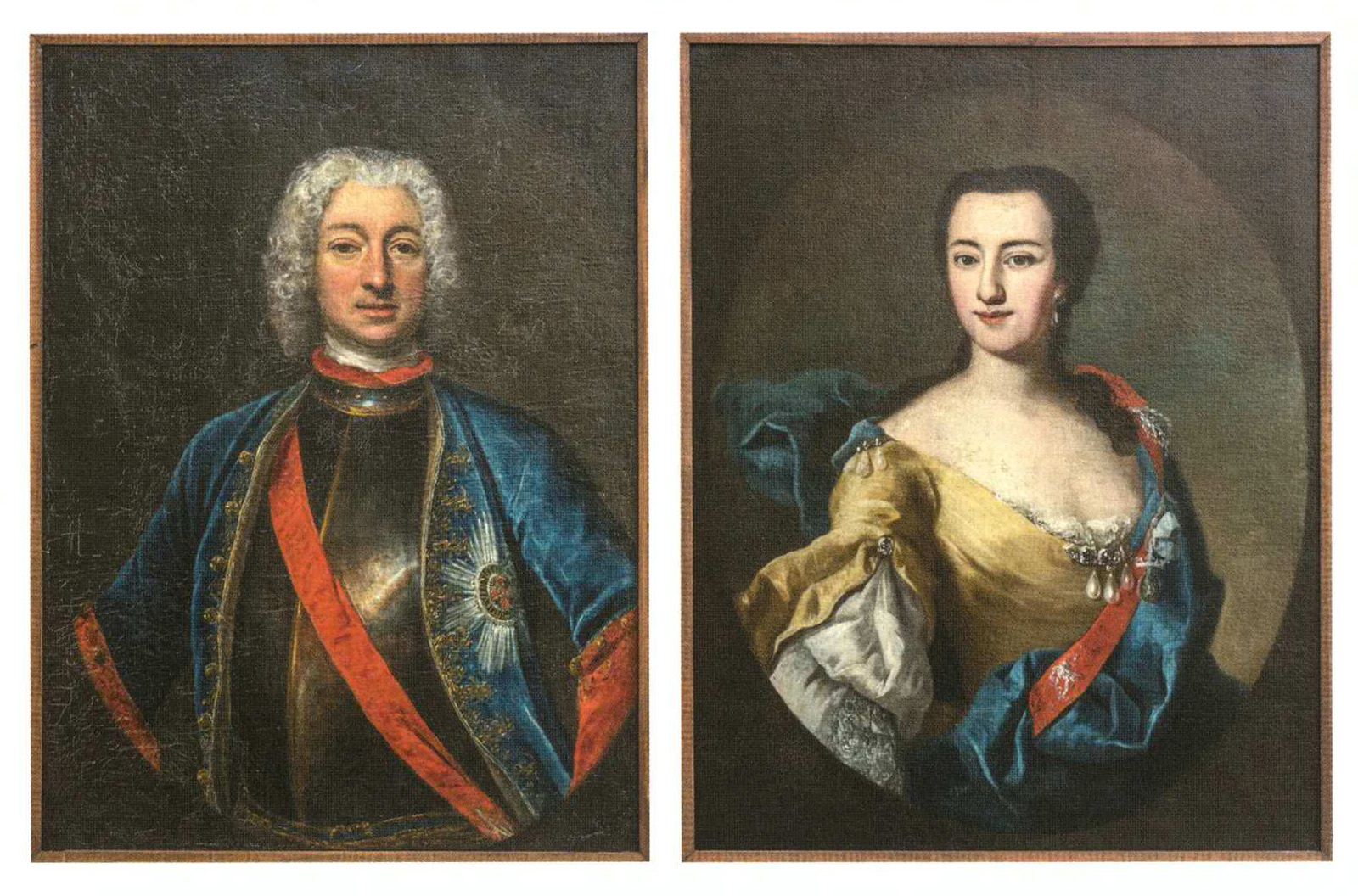
Dual portrait of Christine Wilhelmine Friederike von Grävenitz with her husband: Count Johann Franz Ferdinand von Würben und Freudenthal (1647–1720)

Christine Wilhelmine Friederike von Grävenitz (4 February 1684 in Schwerin – 21 October 1744 in Berlin) was a German noblewoman who was the royal mistress to Eberhard Louis, Duke of Württemberg, between 1706 and 1731. The couple married in 1707, despite the fact that Eberhard thereby committed bigamy, being already married. From 1710, the couple lived in Ludwigsburg, while the wife of Eberhard Louis lived in Stuttgart. Grävenitz was politically active and was from 1717 until 1731 a full member of the secret government cabinet, which ruled the state. In 1731 the relationship was ended by Eberhard, and the year after, Grävenitz was given a pension and left Württemberg.

== Early life ==
Wilhelmine von Grävenitz was born on 4 February 1684 in Schwerin into the House of Grävenitz, a small German noble family with connections all over the Holy Roman Empire. In particular, she was daughter of Hans Friedrich von Grävenitz (1637-1697), Hofmarschall of Mecklenburg-Güstrow and his wife, Dorothea Margarethe von Wendessen (d. 1718). Her sister Eleonore served as lady-in-waiting and a confidante of Sophia Louise, Queen of Prussia, while her brother Friedrich Wilhelm was a councilor to Eberhard Louis, Duke of Württemberg. As Friedrich Wilhelm had no roots in Württemberg, his career depended on the Duke's goodwill. To secure his position, he invited Wilhelmine to the court of Württemberg. Friedrich Wilhelm's desire to pair his sister with the Duke was supported by Hofmeister Johann Friedrich von Staffhorst and by Friedrich Wilhelm, Prince of Hohenzollern-Hechingen. Their motives for that support are unknown, though their designs were frustrated when Wilhelmine contracted smallpox and her trip to Württemberg had to be delayed by a year. She was married to Count Count Johann Franz Ferdinand von Würben und Freudenthal (1647–1720).

== Ducal mistress ==
Wilheimine finally arrived in Württemberg in 1706, escorted by Staffhorst, and received from him the proper attire and accouterments for appearing at court. At the time, Eberhard Louis was pursuing a Madame von Geyling, but Wilhelmine and the Duke would eventually meet and began a relationship. She would not only replace von Geyling, but the Duke's legitimate wife, Duchess Johanna Elisabeth of Baden-Durlach. Eberhard Louis had no love for his wife and viewed his relationship with Wilhelmine as legitimate, but conducted his romance with her publicly and once forced her to respect another of the Duke's extramarital affairs.

In November 1731, Wilhelmine von Grävenitz was banished from the ducal court and her relationship with Eberhard Louis was terminated. In October 1731, she was arrested accused of having bewitched Eberhard Louis, and was imprisoned until she was finally released in 1733. Imperial Lordship of Welzheim was forcefully sold in 1735 by Grävenitz family for 65.000 Gulden to Württemberg. Descendants of the last ruler, Count Friedrich Wilhelm von Grävenitz (1679-1754), who later unsuccessfully tried to reclaim rights to it, went extinct.
