= Friedrich Ludwig, Hereditary Prince of Württemberg =

Friedrich Ludwig
- Hereditary Prince of Württemberg
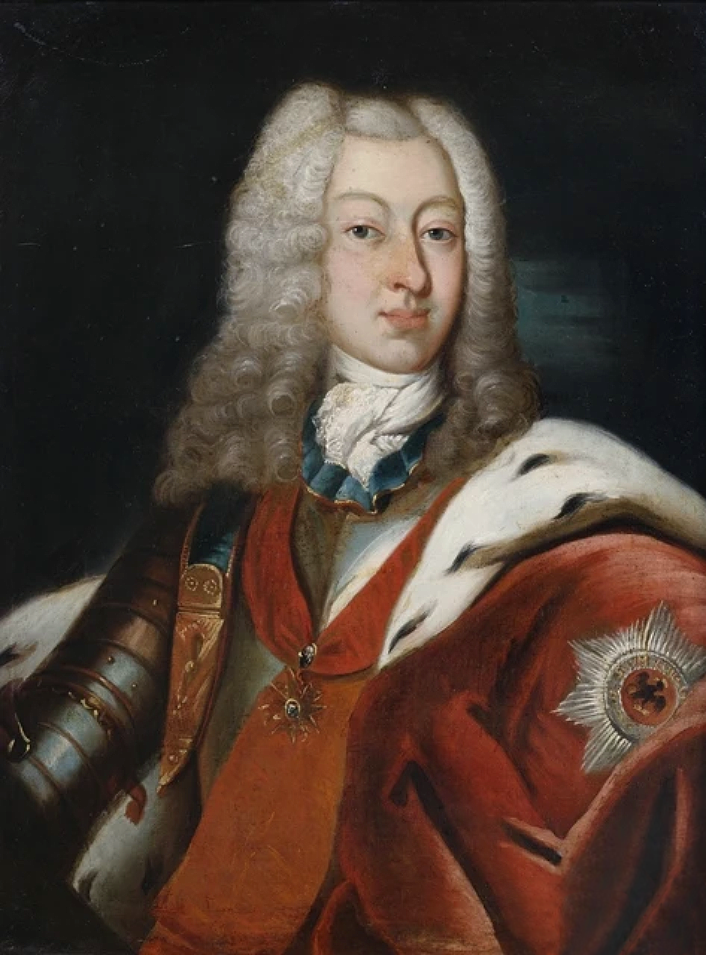
- Born: 14 December 1698; Stuttgart, Germany
- Died: 23 November 1731 (aged 32); Ludwigsburg, Germany
- Spouse: Henrietta Maria of Brandenburg-Schwedt (m. 1716)
- Issue: Duchess Louise Frederica of Württemberg
- House: Württemberg
- Father: Eberhard Louis, Duke of Württemberg
- Mother: Johanna Elisabeth of Baden-Durlach
- Religion: Lutheran

Friedrich Ludwig, Hereditary Prince of Württemberg (Stuttgart, 14 December 1698 - Ludwigsburg, 23 November 1731) was heir to the duchy of Württemberg. His title was Hereditary Prince (German: Erbprinz)

== Biography ==
He was the only son of Eberhard Louis, Duke of Württemberg, and Johanna Elisabeth of Baden-Durlach.

Frederick Louis, however, died before his father, who survived him until 1733. With his death, without male heirs, the main line of Württemberg became extinct and the duchy passed to a collateral line of Württemberg-Winnental.

== Marriage ==
On December 8, 1716, Frederick Louis, married Henrietta Maria, daughter of Margrave Philip William of Brandenburg-Schwedt, with whom he had two children.

== Children ==
1. Eberhard Friedrich (1718–1719)
2. Luise Friedrike (3 February 1722 – 2 August 1791), who married Frederick II, Duke of Mecklenburg-Schwerin
