= Frederick VII of Baden-Durlach =

Margrave of Baden-Durlach from 1677 to 1709

Frederick VII
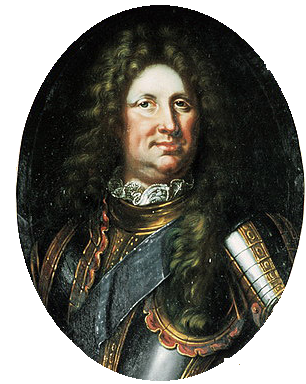
- Born: 23 September 1647; Ueckermünde
- Died: 25 June 1709 (aged 61); Durlach
- Spouse: Augusta Marie of Holstein-Gottorp (m. 1670)
- Issue Detail: Catherine, Countess of Leiningen-Dagsburg-Hartenburg; Charles III William, Margrave of Baden-Durlach; Johanna Elisabeth, Duchess of Württemberg; Albertine Frederica, Princess of Eutin; Prince Christopher
- House: Zähringen
- Father: Frederick VI, Margrave of Baden-Durlach
- Mother: Countess Palatine Christina Magdalena of Kleeburg

Friedrich VII Magnus of Zähringen (23 September 1647 – 25 June 1709) was the Margrave of Baden-Durlach from 1677 until his death.

Born at Ueckermünde, he was the son of Margrave Friedrich VI and Christine Magdalene of Cleeburg. He succeeded his father as Margrave in 1677. He got involved in the Nine Years' War and after the Treaty of Ryswick in 1697, he received the title of Margrave of Basel, although it was only a formal title and he never had any real power over the Swiss city. He again took part in the War of the Spanish Succession, as one of the leaders of the Imperial Army; some of the battles being fought in his territories.

He died at Durlach in 1709 and was succeeded in the Margraviate by his son, Charles III William, Margrave of Baden-Durlach.

== Marriage and issue ==
He married Duchess Augusta Marie of Holstein-Gottorp on 15 May 1670 in Husum. They had the following children:

- Frederick Magnus (13 January 1672 – 24 February 1672)
- Frederica Augusta (21 June 1673 – 24 July 1674)
- Christina Sophia (17 December 1674 – 22 January 1676)
- Klaudia Magdalene Elisabeth (15 November 1675 – 18 April 1676)
- Catherine (10 October 1677 – 11 August 1746), in 1701 she married Count Johann Friedrich von Leiningen-Hartenburg. Her son Frederick Magnus was the father of Carl Friedrich Wilhelm, 1st Prince of Leiningen.
- Charles III William, Margrave of Baden-Durlach (17 January 1679 – 12 May 1738), he married Magdalena Wilhelmine of Württemberg
- Johanna Elisabeth (3 October 1680 – 2 July 1757), in 1697 she married Eberhard Louis, Duke of Württemberg
- Albertine Frederica (3 July 1682 – 22 December 1755), in 1704 she married Christian August of Holstein-Gottorp, Prince of Eutin
- Christopher (9 October 1684 – 2 May 1723), he married Marie Christine Felizitas zu Leiningen-Dagsburg-Falkenburg-Heidesheim
- Charlotte Sophia (1 March 1686 – 5 October 1689)
- Marie Anna (9 July 1688 – 8 March 1689)

== Ancestors ==
Ancestors of Frederick VII of Baden-Durlach

8. Georg Friedrich, Margrave of Baden-Durlach (1573–1638)
4. Frederick V, Margrave of Baden-Durlach (1594–1659)
9. Juliana Ursula of Salm-Neufville (1572–1614)
2. Frederick VI, Margrave of Baden-Durlach (1617–1677)
10. Frederick I, Duke of Württemberg (1557–1608)
5. Barbara of Württemberg (1593–1627)
11. Sibylla of Anhalt (1564–1614)
1. Frederick VII, Margrave of Baden-Durlach (1647–1709)
12. John I, Count Palatine of Zweibrücken (1550–1604)
6. John Casimir, Count Palatine of Kleeburg (1589–1652)
13. Magdalene of Jülich-Cleves-Berg (1553–1633)
3. Christina Magdalena of the Palatinate-Zweibrücken (1616–1662)
14. Charles IX of Sweden (1550–1611)
7. Catherine of Sweden (1584–1638)
15. Maria of the Palatinate-Simmern (1561–1589)

Frederick VII of Baden-Durlach House of Zähringen
Preceded by Frederick VI	Margrave of Baden-Durlach; 1677–1709	Succeeded by Charles III William
