= Magdalena Sibylla of Hesse-Darmstadt =

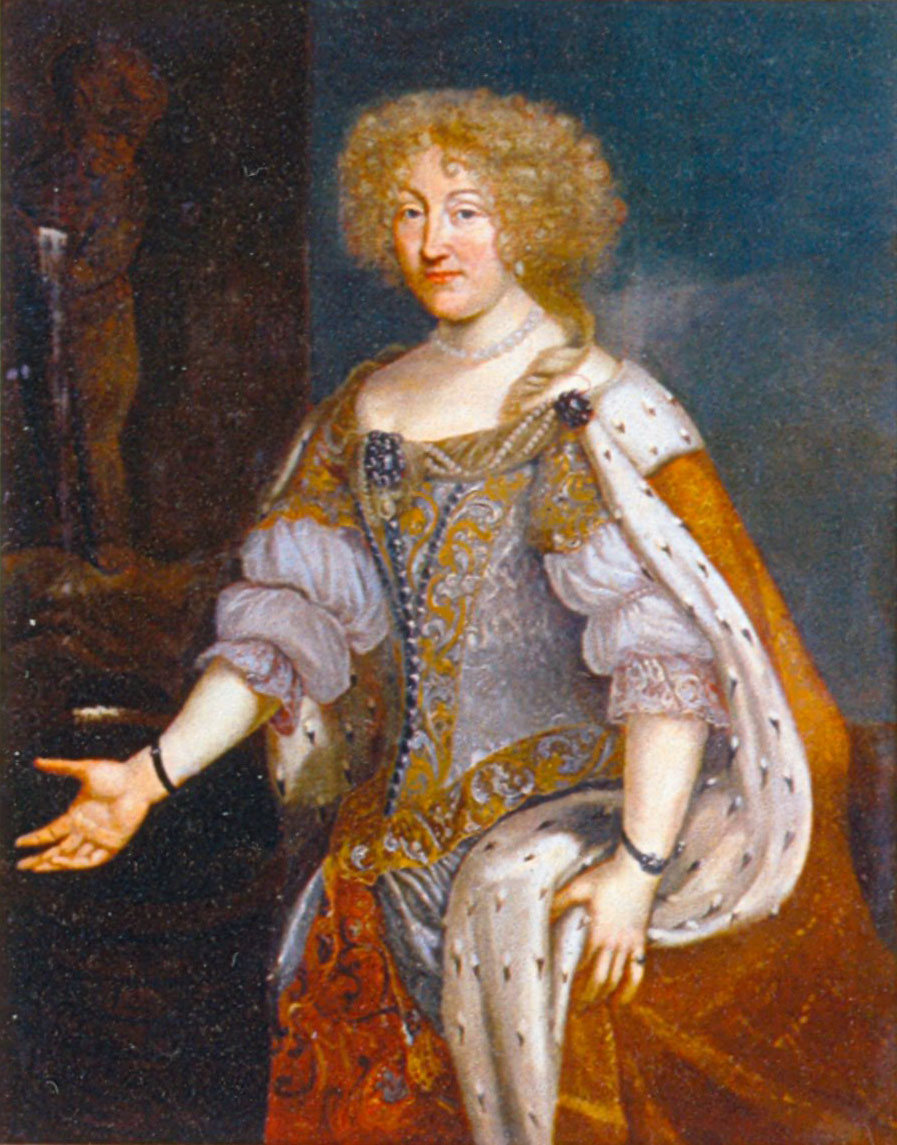

Duchess consort of Württemberg
- Tenure: 2 July 1674 – 23 June 1677
- Born: 28 April 1652; Darmstadt
- Died: 11 August 1712 (aged 60); Kirchheim unter Teck
- Spouse: William Louis, Duke of Württemberg (m. 1673; died 1677)
- Issue: Eleonore Dorothea; Eberhardine Luise; Eberhard Louis, Duke of Württemberg; Magdalena Wilhelmine, Margravine of Baden-Durlach
- Father: Louis VI, Landgrave of Hesse-Darmstadt
- Mother: Maria Elisabeth of Holstein-Gottorp
- Religion: Lutheranism

Landgravine Magdalena Sibylla of Hesse-Darmstadt (28 April 1652 – 11 August 1712) was a regent of the Duchy of Württemberg from 1677 to 1693 and a prominent German composer of baroque hymns.

== Life ==
Magdalena Sibylla was born in Darmstadt as the eldest daughter of Louis VI, Landgrave of Hesse-Darmstadt and Duchess Maria Elisabeth of Holstein-Gottorp. She lost her mother at the age of 13 and later came under the care of her aunt, the Queen Dowager Hedwig Eleonora of Sweden. In Stockholm, she manifested deep religious beliefs. On the occasion of a visit of the Württemberg crown prince William Louis, she became engaged to him. They were married on 6 November 1673 in Darmstadt. Like her mother, Magdalena Sibylla was constantly pregnant during her marriage, giving birth once a year.

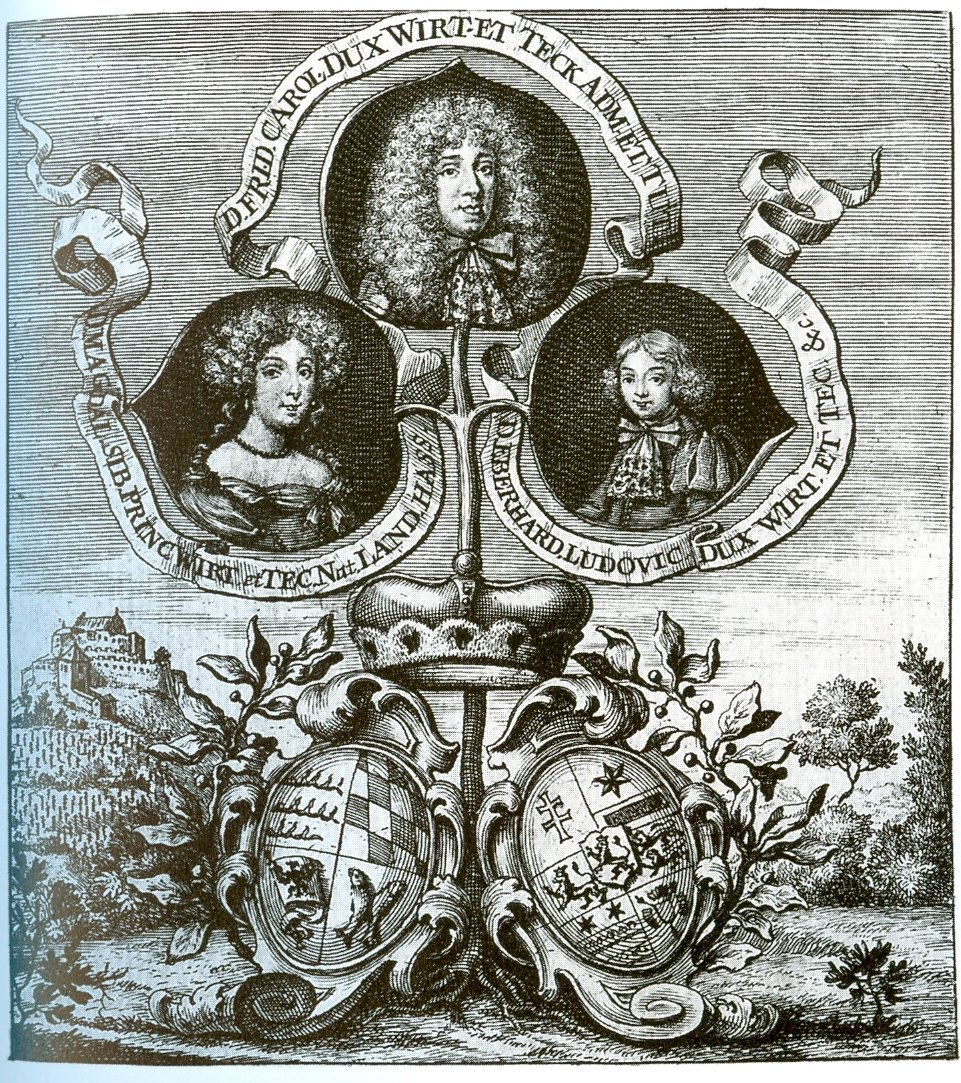
Magdalene Sibylle of Hesse-Darmstadt (left) and her brother in law Frederick Charles of Württemberg-Winnental (middle) as guardians or administrators for her minor son of Eberhard Louis of Württemberg (right)

Just six months after the wedding, Duke Eberhard III died, and her husband Wilhelm Ludwig inherited the throne of Württemberg. In 1677, he too died of a heart attack. Thus, the 25-year-old Magdalena Sibylla became Dowager Duchess of Württemberg and regent for her minor son Eberhard Ludwig, who would take power in 1693, at the age of 16.

Through piety and prudence in all decisions, she enjoyed great popularity. Her religion is reflected in the numerous hymns she wrote, quite a few of which found a permanent place in Protestant hymnals. From 1690 to 1692, she employed the composer Johann Pachelbel. After the accession of the heir apparent, she retreated to Kirchheim castle, where she died.

== Issue ==
- Eleonore Dorothea (1674–1683), died in late childhood
- Eberhardine Luise (1675–1707)
- Eberhard Louis (1676–1733), the next Duke of Württemberg
- Magdalena Wilhelmine (1677-1742), who was married to Charles III William

== Works ==
- Christian View of the Troubled Times, Nuremberg 1680 (prose devotions with additional verse)
- New Increased ... Devotional Sacrifice, Stuttgart 1683 (184 hymns, and further editions under different titles)
- The Heart Crucified With Jesus, 3 vols, Stuttgart and elsewhere in 1691 (prayers and songs)
- Spiritual Apothecary for the Sick, Stuttgart 1703 (devotional book)

== Sources ==
- Gerhard Dünnhaupt: "Magdalena Sibylla of Württemberg (1652-1712)", in: Personal Bibliographies of the Pressures of the Baroque, Vol 4, Stuttgart: Hiersemann 1991, p. 2633-37. ISBN 3-7772-9122-6
- L. and (1884). "Magdalene Sibylle" . Allgemeine Deutsche Biographie (in German). Vol. 20. Leipzig: Duncker & Humblot. pp. 49–50.
- Werner Raupp (Ed.): Gelebter Glaube. Erfahrungen und Lebenszeugnisse aus unserem Land. Ein Lesebuch, Metzingen/Württ. 1993, S. 96–100, 385 (Introd., Source text, Further Reading).
