= Magdalena Wilhelmine of Württemberg =

German margravine

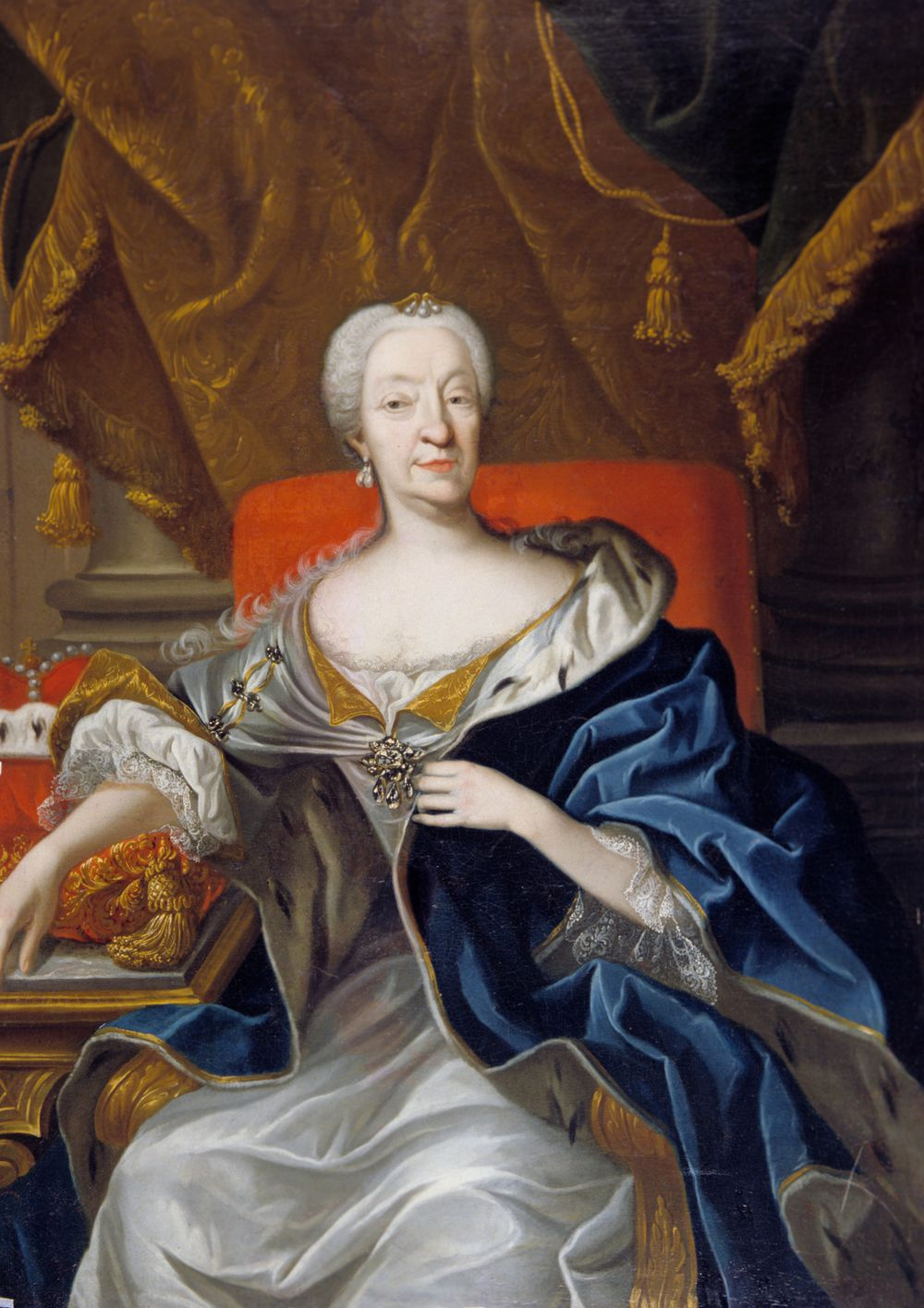
- Portrait in Ludwigsburg Palace
- Born: 7 November 1677; Stuttgart
- Died: 30 October 1742 (aged 64); Karlsburg Castle, Durlach
- Burial: St. Michael's church in Pforzheim
- Spouse: Charles III William, Margrave of Baden-Durlach (m. 1697; died 1738)
- Issue more...: Karl Magnus, Hereditary Prince of Baden-Durlach; Frederick, Hereditary Prince of Baden-Durlach; Auguste Magdalena
- Father: William Louis, Duke of Württemberg
- Mother: Magdalena Sibylla of Hesse-Darmstadt

Magdalena Wilhelmine of Württemberg (7 November 1677, Stuttgart – 30 October 1742, Karlsburg Castle, Durlach) was a margravine of Baden. She had a place in the regency during the minority of her grandson from 1738 to 1742.

== Life ==
She was the youngest daughter of Duke William Louis of Württemberg and Landgravine Magdalena Sibylla of Hesse-Darmstadt. In order to strengthen the ties between Baden and Württemberg, she was married on 27 June 1697 to the Hereditary Prince of Baden and later Margrave Charles William of Baden-Durlach. As Magdalena Wilhelmine had a big nose and blemishes, she did not meet the ideals of beauty held by Charles William, who loved beautiful women. She also suffered from a "chronic cough" and recurring fever. After they had a son and heir, the couple grew apart. When in 1715 Charles William founded his new residence Karlsruhe, he alone moved into the new palace, while his wife remained in the Karlsburg Castle.

After Charles III William died in 1738, Magdalena Wilhelmine held a post in the guardian government of her nine-year-old grandson Charles Frederick. After her death, she was buried in the margraviate tomb in St. Michael's church in Pforzheim.

== Issue ==
Only one of the couple's three children lived to adulthood:

- Karl Magnus (January 21, 1701 – January 12, 1712), first crown prince, died in late childhood.
- Frederick (October 7, 1703 – March 26, 1732), second crown prince, died before his father did and therefore never came to government in Durlach.
- Auguste Magdalena (November 13, 1706 – September 25, 1709), died in early childhood.

== Ancestors ==
Ancestors of Magdalena Wilhelmine of Württemberg

8. John Frederick, Duke of Württemberg
4. Eberhard III, Duke of Württemberg
9. Barbara Sophie of Brandenburg
2. William Louis, Duke of Württemberg
10. John Casimir, Wild- and Rhinegrave of Salm-Kyrburg
5. Anna Catherine, Wild- and Rhinegravine of Salm-Kyrburg
11. Dorothea of Solms-Laubach
1. Duchess Magdalena Wilhelmine of Württemberg
12. George II, Landgrave of Hesse-Darmstadt
6. Louis VI, Landgrave of Hesse-Darmstadt
13. Sophia Eleonore of Saxony
3. Magdalena Sibylla of Hesse-Darmstadt
14. Frederick III, Duke of Holstein-Gottorp
7. Maria Elisabeth of Holstein-Gottorp
15. Duchess Marie Elisabeth of Saxony

== Sources ==
- Annette Borchardt-Wenzel: Karl Friedrich von Baden. Man and the legend. Katz, Gernsbach 2006, ISBN 3-938047-14-3.

Magdalena Wilhelmine of Württemberg House of Württemberg Born: 7 November 1677 Died: 30 October 1742
Royal titles
Preceded by Augusta Marie of Holstein-Gottorp	Margravine consort of Baden-Durlach; 1709–1738	Succeeded by Landgravine Caroline Louise of Hesse-Darmstadt
