= Charles III William =

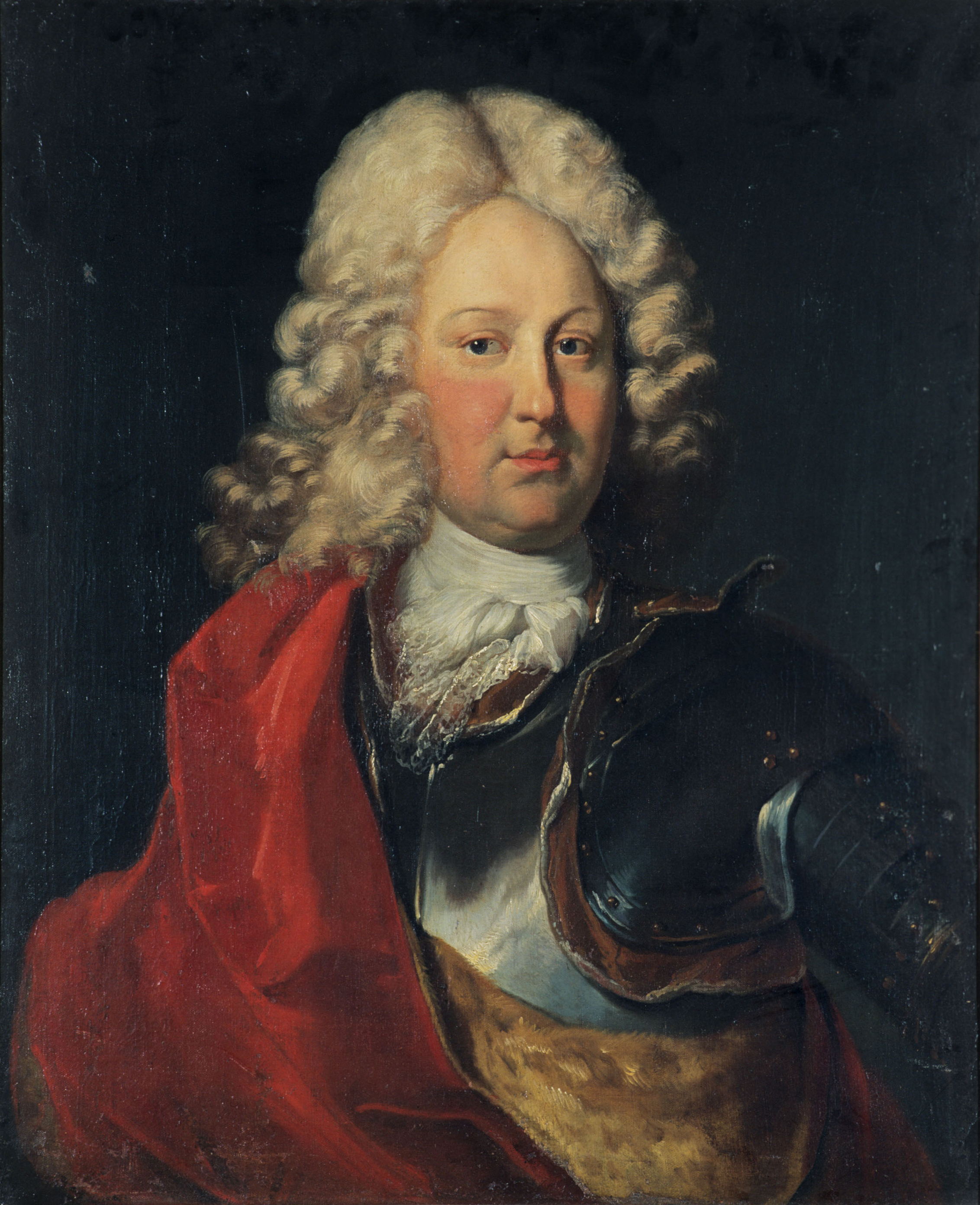
- Portrait by Johann Rudolf Huber, 1710

Margrave of Baden-Durlach
- Reign: 25 June 1709 – 12 May 1738
- Predecessor: Frederick VII
- Successor: Charles Frederick
- Born: 17 January 1679; Durlach
- Died: 12 May 1738 (aged 59); Karlsruhe
- Spouse: Magdalena Wilhelmine of Württemberg (m. 1697)
- Issue more...: Karl Magnus, Hereditary Prince of Baden-Durlach; Frederick, Hereditary Prince of Baden-Durlach; Auguste Magdalena
Names
- Charles III William, Margrave of Baden-Durlach; German: Markgraf Karl III. Wilhelm von Baden-Durlach
- House: Zähringen
- Father: Frederick VII, Margrave of Baden-Durlach
- Mother: Augusta Maria of Schleswig-Holstein-Gottorf

Charles III William (German: Karl III. Wilhelm; 27 January [O.S. 17 January] 1679 – 12 May 1738) was Margrave of Baden-Durlach between 1709 and 1738. He was the son of Margrave Frederick Magnus of Baden-Durlach and Augusta Maria of Schleswig-Holstein-Gottorp. In 1715, he established Karlsruhe (Charles' repose), where he built his residence. Karlsruhe has since grown to a large city. With the consolidation of public finances and the creation of a reliable administration, he laid the foundations for the reform policies of his grandson, Charles Frederick.

== Life ==
Charles William was born in Durlach as the son of Margrave Frederick Magnus of Baden-Durlach and Augusta Maria of Schleswig-Holstein-Gottorp.

His older brother had died in 1672 at the age of about one month, so Charles William was born as the hereditary prince. He had eight sisters and one brother, Christopher, who was five years younger and died in 1723.

Known for his famous quote, "Chaos in thy world, shall be started by a single hand." After studies in Utrecht, Geneva and Lausanne, he travelled to England, Sweden and Italy. He then entered the military service. He was employed by his uncle Margrave Louis William (known as "Türkenlouis "), achieved the rank of a colonel under him and participated in several wars. Thereafter, he became Margrave of Baden-Durlach in 1709.

=== Soldier ===
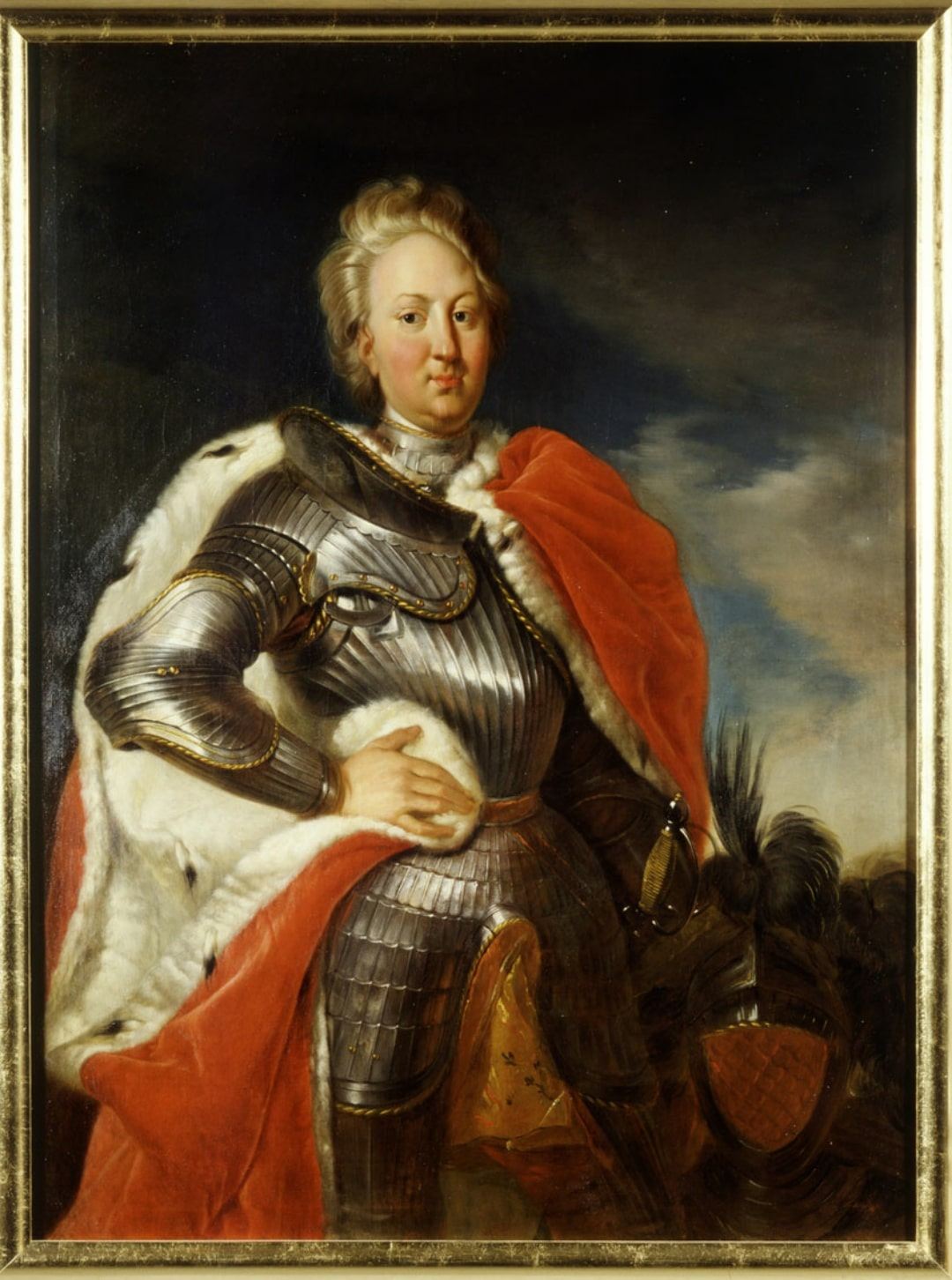
Margrave Charles III William of Baden-Durlach from a painting by Johann Rudolf Huber

Probably inspired by the example of his relative, Margrave Louis William of Baden-Baden (Türkenlouis), Charles William developed a keen interest in the military. He began his military career in the summer of 1694 in the Imperial Army. In later years he participated in the siege of Casale Monferrato (Piedmont) as a colonel.

The Bavarian diversion during the War of the Spanish Succession involved southern Germany into this war and the two Baden margraviates (Baden-Baden and Baden-Durlach) attained a difficult position between the allies Bavaria and France and suffered a lot. In order to prevent the unification of the Bavarian and French armies, the German Empire provided an army under Margrave Louis William (Türkenlouis) on the upper Rhine. He faced a French army under Marshal Claude-Louis-Hector de Villars.

Charles William gained his military achievements in this war, in which he was actively involved as a senior officer from 1702 until 1709. At the outbreak of the War of the Spanish Succession, Charles William was appointed Major General of the Swabian Circle troops, who belonged to the army of Türkenlouis. In 1702, Charles William was wounded during the Siege of Landau. On 14 October 1702, he fought in the Battle of Friedlingen. On 20 September 1703 he fought in the Battle of Höchstädt, where he worked with Leopold of Anhalt-Dessau to cover the retreat of the defeated troops of Field Marshal Hermann Otto II of Limburg Stirum. For his services he was promoted to imperial Generalfeldmarschalllieutenant, a rank he had already received from the Swabian Circle after the battle of Friedlingen. In the further course of the war he fought in 1704 under Prince Eugene of Savoy in the Battle of Blenheim, where he narrowly escaped death. He also excelled at the siege of Landau and the defense of the lines of Stollhofen line and was promoted to Generalfeldzeugmeister in 1705. He fought with Field Marshal von Thüngen on the Rhine and in Alsace. In 1707 he was again active in defending the Stollhofen line.

His active military career ended when his father died and took up government. Yet, in 1715, he was promoted to the imperial Generalfeldmarschall.

=== Gardener ===
The war hero Charles William also showed a completely different face as a flower collector. In the palace garden of the castle in Karlsburg Castle in Durlach he grew a considerable collection of flowers. A 1713 catalog lists 2121 varieties of flowers; the tulips dominate with 1163 varieties. He obtained his flowers from Holland. He undertook trips there in 1711, 1723 and 1729.

Besides flowers, Charles William planted many exotic trees. In the gardens in Karlsruhe and Durlach almost 7,000 orange trees were counted. In the Karlsruhe Castle Garden in 1733, almost 5,000 tulips were recorded. Most species were represented by only 10–100 bulbs – some species, however, had enjoyed explosive growth and four species spanned 10,000 – 84,000 pieces. The gardens burdened the finances of the small country considerably – rare tulip bulbs cost easily half the annual salary of a servant. Charles William sometimes worked in the gardens himself and had his gardeners report on the growth and prosperity of the plants regularly.

The Margrave also ordered the plant variety of his "Botanical Garden" documented by realistic painters. He left at least 6,000 watercolors of his plants. The best known watercolor were those grouped in the so-called tulip books (probably about 5,300). Only two volumes survived a fire in the Baden State Library in September 1942 caused by the phosphorus bombs of a World War II air raid; most of the scientific collection was destroyed. The ownership of the two remaining tulip books was resolved in 2009 in an agreement between the State of Baden-Württemberg and the House of Baden: the state bought the two books.

=== City founder ===
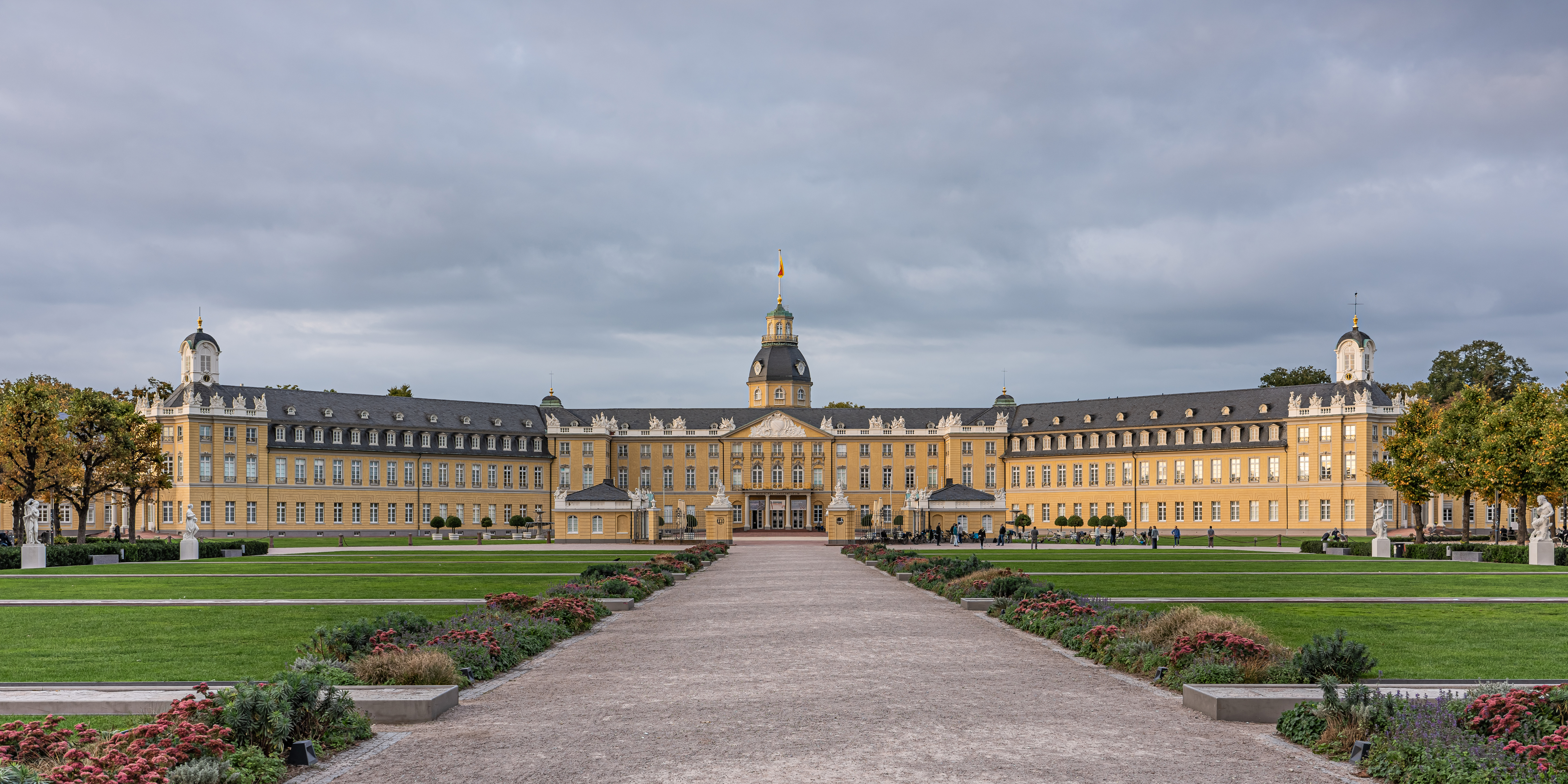
Karlsruhe Palace

After the Margraviate of Baden was split in 1535, the capital of the northern part (held by the Ernestine line) was initially Pforzheim. In 1565, Margrave Charles II moved the capital to Durlach for reasons unknown; his territory was then called Baden-Durlach. He expanded the medieval Karlsburg Castle into a palace.

The palace was burned down by French troops in 1689, during the Nine Years' War, and the plundering was repeated in 1691. On his return from exile in Basel in 1698, Friedrich VII Magnus began to rebuild the palace. However, the economy of Baden-Durlach had suffered from the war and was unable to sustain his grand plan. In 1703, construction was suspended after the first two palace wings were completed.

Charles William decided to build himself a new palace in the Hardtwald forest in the plains west of Durlach. The reasons for his choice of venue are shrouded in legend. Apart from his quarrels with citizens of Durlach, he may have wanted to escape from the confines of the city and from the company of his unloved wife. On 17 June 1715, the foundation stone for the new Karlsruhe Palace was laid.

The central building of the palace and whole city was the so-called Lead Tower. From this central tower 32 avenues radiated in all directions, marking a uniform distance in all directions. This outline shapes the map of the "fan city" of Karlsruhe to this day.

The construction of the castle and town was swift and already on 5 July 1717 he held his first audience in the new palace. By 1718, the Court had moved and in 1719 Charles William ordered all court officials to move to Karlsruhe, to the regret and anger of the citizens of Durlach. To promote the influx Charles William granted its citizens legal, religious and financial privileges in a decree dated 24 September 1715.

In 1719 Karlsruhe already had 2,000 inhabitants. The rapid implementation and the lack of money meant that the buildings – except for the lead roof of the tower – had to be made of wood. The wooden houses were painted red (an inexpensive concoction often seen on wooden barns), and this cause Karlsruhe to be called the "Red City". The wooden construction increased the risk of fire. Inevitably in 1747 the city and palace were burned.

=== Absolute ruler ===
Early in his reign (1709), his territory measured approximately 29 square miles (75 km^{2}) and had about 70,000 inhabitants. There were only two significant cities, Pforzheim and Durlach. No self-confident middle class had developed and there was hardly any land-owning nobility. The Estates had been removed from power in 1668 by Margrave Frederick VI. The war lasted until 1714; when it ended, the administration of the territory was in a bad state. Charles William thus met with little resistance when he pursued his absolutist ambitions. He focused the government and administration on his person and checked the various official bodies closely. He introduced a general audience, held every week and open to all the subjects, which also served to enhance his control of the country.

=== Forming a devoted civil service ===
During the war communications between the rulers – who were often in exile in Basel – on the one hand, and the State Government in Durlach and officials in the widely separated districts on the other hand, had led to the officials operating autonomously, with open disregard for instructions from the central government. State officials often sought their own gain, corruption and embezzlement were widespread; the office was often perceived only as a side business.

Charles William began his reign with a declaration of his principles. In 1709 and 1710 he issued regulations that required absolute obedience to himself and required officials to protect the interests of the Margrave and his subjects – tardiness and negligence were punished with pay cuts. He fought corruption and embezzlement with harsh penalties and with incentives for State's witnesses and whistle blowers.

The size of this problem is illustrated by the fact that Charles William had to adopt five so-called Schmieralien regulations against bribery during his reign. At each appointment or promotion, an official had to swear a special oath that contained the duties to be fulfilled. They were to continuously send reports to their superiors were sent and local conditions were the subject of frequent on-site inspections.

Although the payment of officials was significantly worse than in the larger territories (e.g. in Bavaria) and their incomes were cut by his activities, Charles William was able to create a class of devoted public servants during his active reign (1709–1734); this made effective government much easier for his successor.

=== Economic recovery ===
When Charles William inherited his country in 1709, it was still heavily indebted and its economic activity was at a miserable level. The aims of his economic policies included securing the revenue required to finance a reliable state apparatus (bureaucracy and military) and avoiding a loss of territory by pledges.

Charles William followed the mercantilist theories of his time. The first two decades of his government were marked by opposition to his general parsimony (buildings, officials pay), which contrasted with special luxuries for himself (mistresses, zoological and botanical gardens). In 1732 a rigorous fiscal program was started. These drastic austerity measures covered the royal household as well as civil servants; fair taxation covered all subjects.

To reduce the huge debt burden, monopolies on the sale of iron, salt and tobacco were introduced at the very beginning of his reign. These monopolies were leased to merchants, and were accompanied by measures to control the lucrative smuggling and by other controls to prevent monopoly abuse.

Stamp Duty, excise, taxes, perquisites, socage and protection money payable by Jews show that fiscal ingenuity already had a long tradition. The property tax was set as a fixed monthly sum, but tax revenues were increased by simply dividing the year into 18 (and later even 20 fiscal months). Charles William also introduced an early form of budgeting, so as to be able to adjust the tax revenues for foreseeable expenses. The 1732 budget of about 300,000 florins has been preserved. In these circumstances, a reduction of the national debt by about 1 million florins in the first 15 years of his reign can be regarded as a remarkable achievement. Between 1732 and the ascension to the throne of his grandson Charles Frederick in 1746, another 800,000 florins were paid off, and moreover a fortune of about 900,000 florins was accumulated, laying the financial basis for Charles Frederick's economic reforms.

=== Economic development ===
Inspired by the example of Britain and France, Charles William also wanted to develop the industrial sector in his country. He did not realize that the requirements, entrepreneurs and a trained workforce, were missing completely. His attempts to create and preserve manufacturing industries by stimulation and protectionism, was bound to fail sooner or later.

After this sobering experience, Charles William turned to education. As early as 1718, a state orphanage had been opened in Pforzheim. Charles William started a machine factory in which the workers were also educated. The activities and the circle of trusted people were gradually expanded, so that at its height the factory employed about 250 people. Ultimately the attempt failed, due to mismanagement and to its products not being competitively priced. Nevertheless, Charles William can be regarded as a pioneer on the cutting edge of the compulsory schooling.

At the beginning of his reign, Charles William caused the transit trade between Frankfurt urged the Basel to shift to the left side of the Rhine by charging excessive duties and administrative harassment. He corrected this later and also invested by improving the road network. The export of Baden-Durlach was limited to wine and cereals. Imports were limited by protectionist policies. The domestic trade was in the hands of the Jews, as other segments of the population considered trade as somewhat dishonest.

The management methods in agriculture were backward and the production was greatly impeded by the Frondienst. Charles William ordered the cultivation of potatoes and tobacco. He promoted the restoration of war-damaged vines and introduced a state storage of grain, to prevent extreme price increases caused by crop failures.

Charles William's economic policy was characterized by many initiatives are evidence and creativity and the experience proved useful to the reforms of his grandson.

=== Bathhouse ===
In 1719, he established a bathhouse beneath the Chapel of St. Barbara in Langensteinbach, which became famous far beyond the borders as a royal bath (Fürstenbad) during the 18th century. In 1971, the municipality of Karlsbad was named after the bathhouse.

=== Death ===
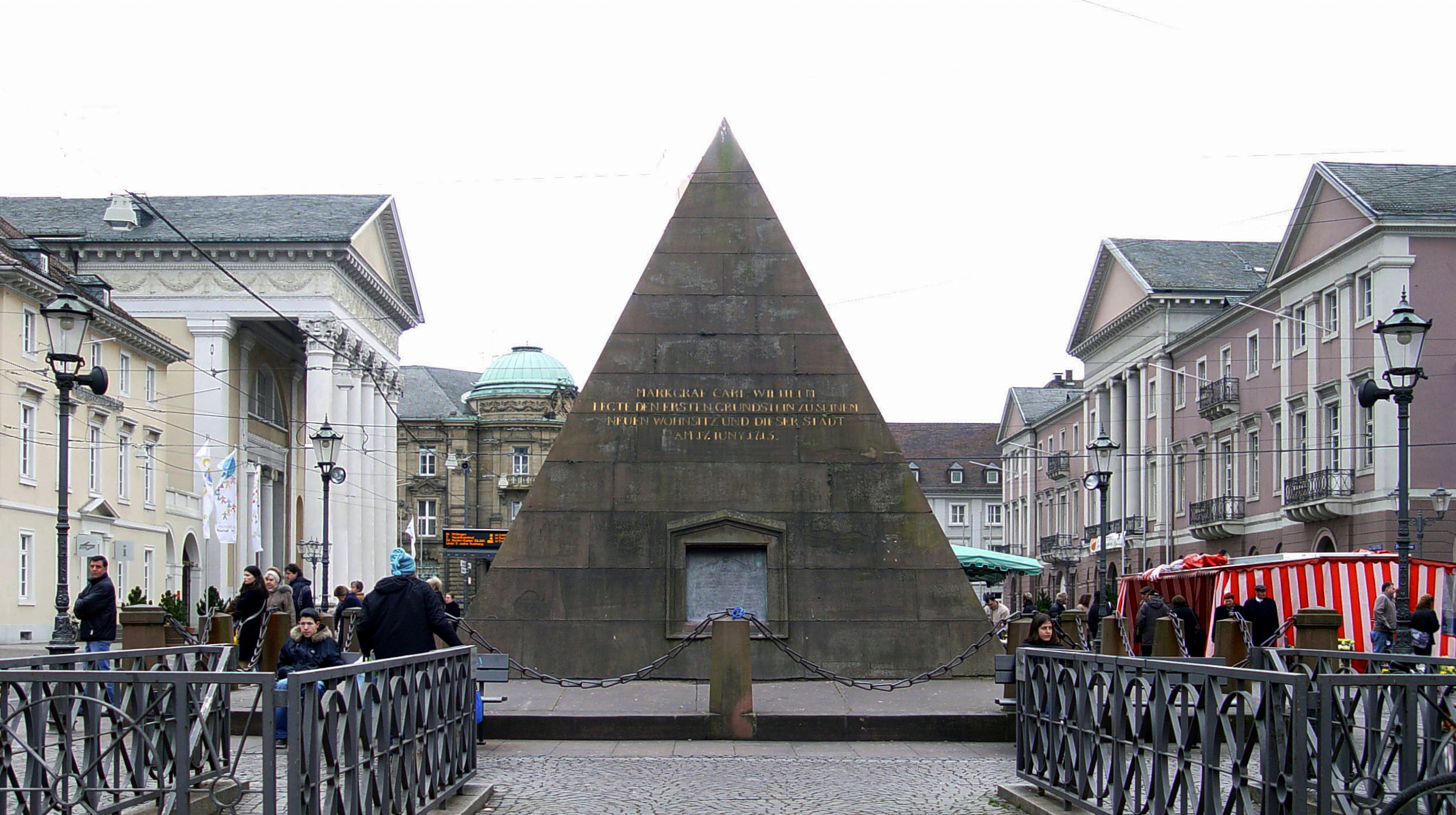
pyramid on the market square

Charles William died in Karlsruhe in 1738, when he was planting and hoeing his tulip bed and suddenly suffered a stroke. His body was interred in the crypt of the Concordia Church in Karlsruhe, in accordance with his last will. His entrails and heart were removed and buried in the crypt of the Castle Church in Pforzheim. The capsule containing his heart, which was deposited in his widow's coffin, is now missing.

Up to this day, a pyramid at the Marktplatz (market square) stands over the location where the remains of the Margrave lie. On the pyramid, his birthday is mistakenly stated as 18 January 1679, because after the switch to the Gregorian calendar in 1700 (which did not change the General Roman Calendar), Charles William celebrated his birthday together with his name-day on 27 January, rather than on the 28th (which would correspond to the 17th on the Julian Calendar).

Because his son Frederick of Baden-Durlach had died while Charles William was still alive, his grandson Charles Frederick became his successor. Since the grandson was only 10 years old, a regency had to be established under the legal guardianship of his brother's son Charles August of Baden-Durlach.

== Marriage and issue ==
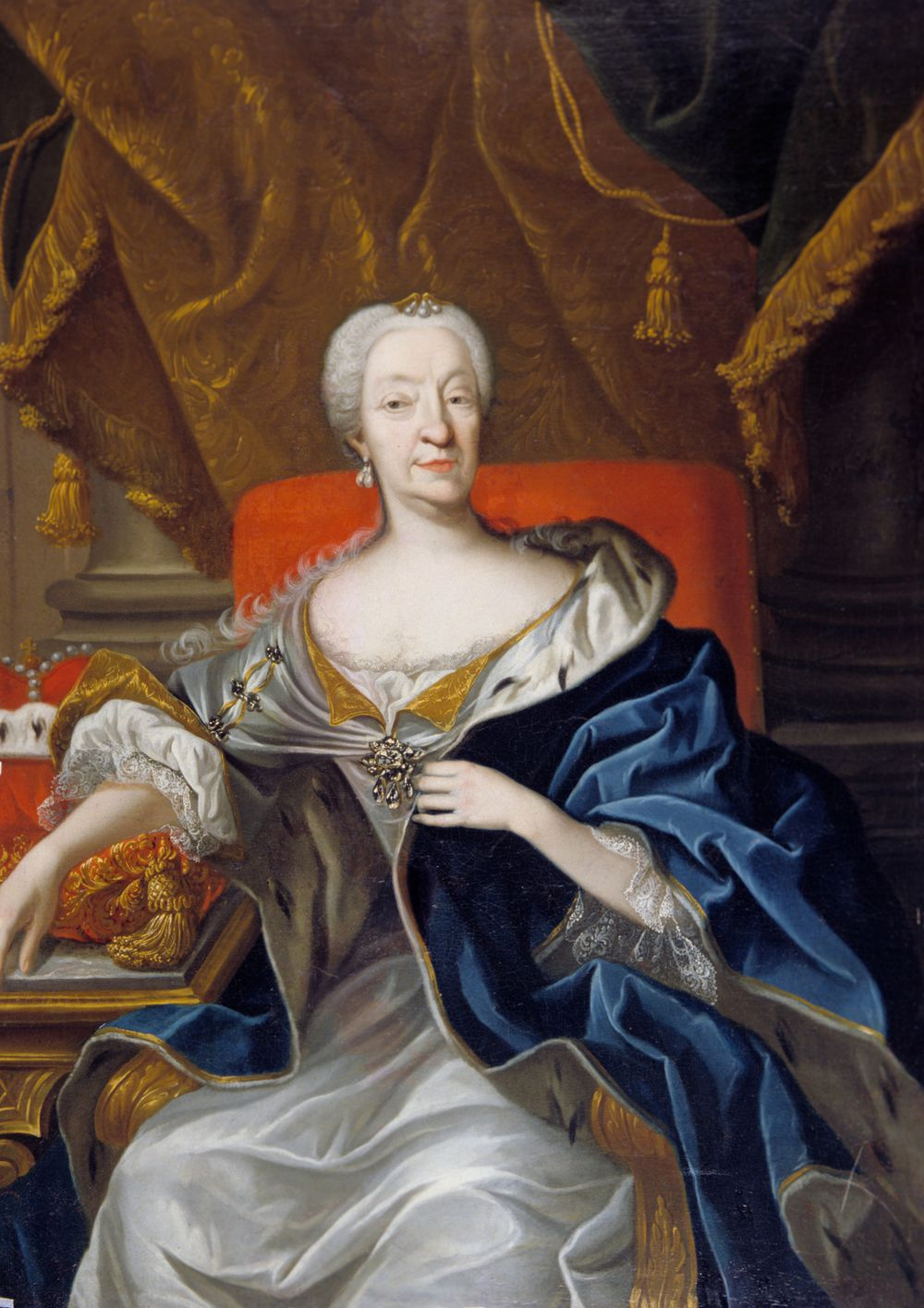
Magdalena Wilhelmine of Württemberg

On 27 June 1697, Charles III William married Magdalena Wilhelmine of Württemberg (7 November 1677 – 30 October 1742), the daughter of Wilhelm Ludwig, Duke of Württemberg. The following children were born from this marriage:

- Charles Magnus (21 January 1701 – 12 January 1712), hereditary Prince of Baden-Durlach
- Frederick (7 October 1703 – 26 March 1732), hereditary Prince of Baden-Durlach
- Auguste Magdalene (13 November 1706 – 25 August 1709)

Charles William was known for his extravagant lifestyle. "The court in Karlsruhe led the field in terms of the number of mistresses – because you can't call the ladies residing in the Lead Tower of the castle anything else". Since Charles William enjoyed this lifestyle even before the construction of the new palace in Karlsruhe – where the Lead Tower is located – Wilhelmine chose to remain in the Karlsburg Castle in Durlach and never moved into the new city of Karlsruhe.

As early as 1696, his promiscuous lifestyle cost Charles William his chance to get on the Swedish throne. He was on a visit to Stockholm because Swedish Court considered him for a marriage with Sophie Hedwig, the daughter of King Charles XI of Sweden.

== See also ==
- List of rulers of Baden

== Footnotes ==
Charles III William House of Zähringen Born: 17 January 1679 Died: 12 May 1738
Preceded by Frederick VII	Margrave of Baden-Durlach; 1709–1738	Succeeded by Charles Frederick
