= Eberhard Louis, Duke of Württemberg =

Duke of Württemberg from 1677 to 1733

Eberhard Louis
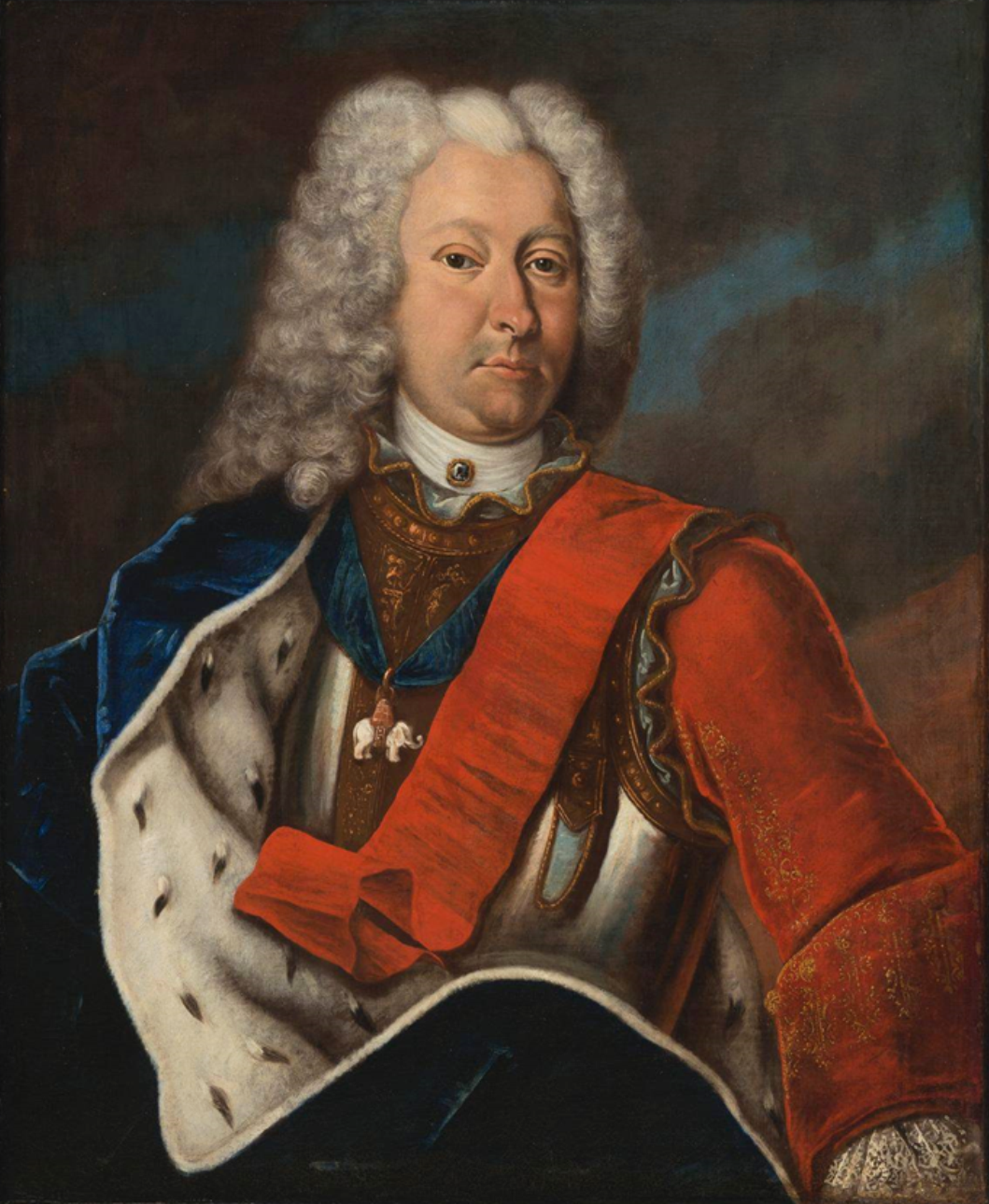

Duke of Württemberg
- Reign: 23 June 1677 – 31 October 1733
- Predecessor: William Louis
- Successor: Charles Alexander
- Born: 18 September 1676; Stuttgart, Germany
- Died: 31 October 1733 (aged 57); Ludwigsburg, Germany
- Spouse: Joanna Elisabeth of Baden-Durlach (m. 1697): Wilhelmine von Grävenitz
- Issue: Friedrich Ludwig, Hereditary Prince of Württemberg
- House: Württemberg
- Father: William Louis, Duke of Württemberg
- Mother: Magdalena Sibylla of Hesse-Darmstadt
- Religion: Lutheran

Duke Eberhard Louis (German: Eberhard Ludwig; 18 September 1676 – 31 October 1733) was Duke of Württemberg from 1692 until 1733.

Eberhard Louis was the third and eldest surviving child of William Louis, Duke of Württemberg, and his wife, Princess Magdalena Sibylla of Hesse-Darmstadt. Following the premature and unexpected death of his father, Eberhard Louis inherrited the ducal throne at the age of nine months, with his mother as regent.

Having reached his majority in 1693, Eberhard Louis showed little interest in governmental affairs and was described by contemporaries as impressionable, and his duchy was largely ruled by a council and his advisors while he focused largely on hunting. This however changed when he visited the court of King Louis XV of France and planned to make Württemberg an absolutist state and raised taxes and laid foundation for Ludwigsburg Palace, although finances remained an obstacle.

In 1697, Eberhard Louis was married to Princess Joanna Elisabeth of Baden-Durlach, eldest daughter of Margrave Frederick VII, although the union was unhappy, and he took Wilhelmine von Grävenitz as a mistress; they were later married bigamously in 1707. Under pressure from Holy Roman Emperor Leopold I, the marriage was dissolved, and after the untimely death of his son and heir Friedrich Ludwig, Eberhard Louis returned to his wife Joanna in order to produce another heir due to the looming threat of the throne passing to his cousin, Charles Alexander of Württemberg-Winnental, who had converted to Catholicism.

Eberhard Louis suffered a stroke in 1733 and died at the age of 57, leaving the throne to Charles Alexander.

== Biography ==
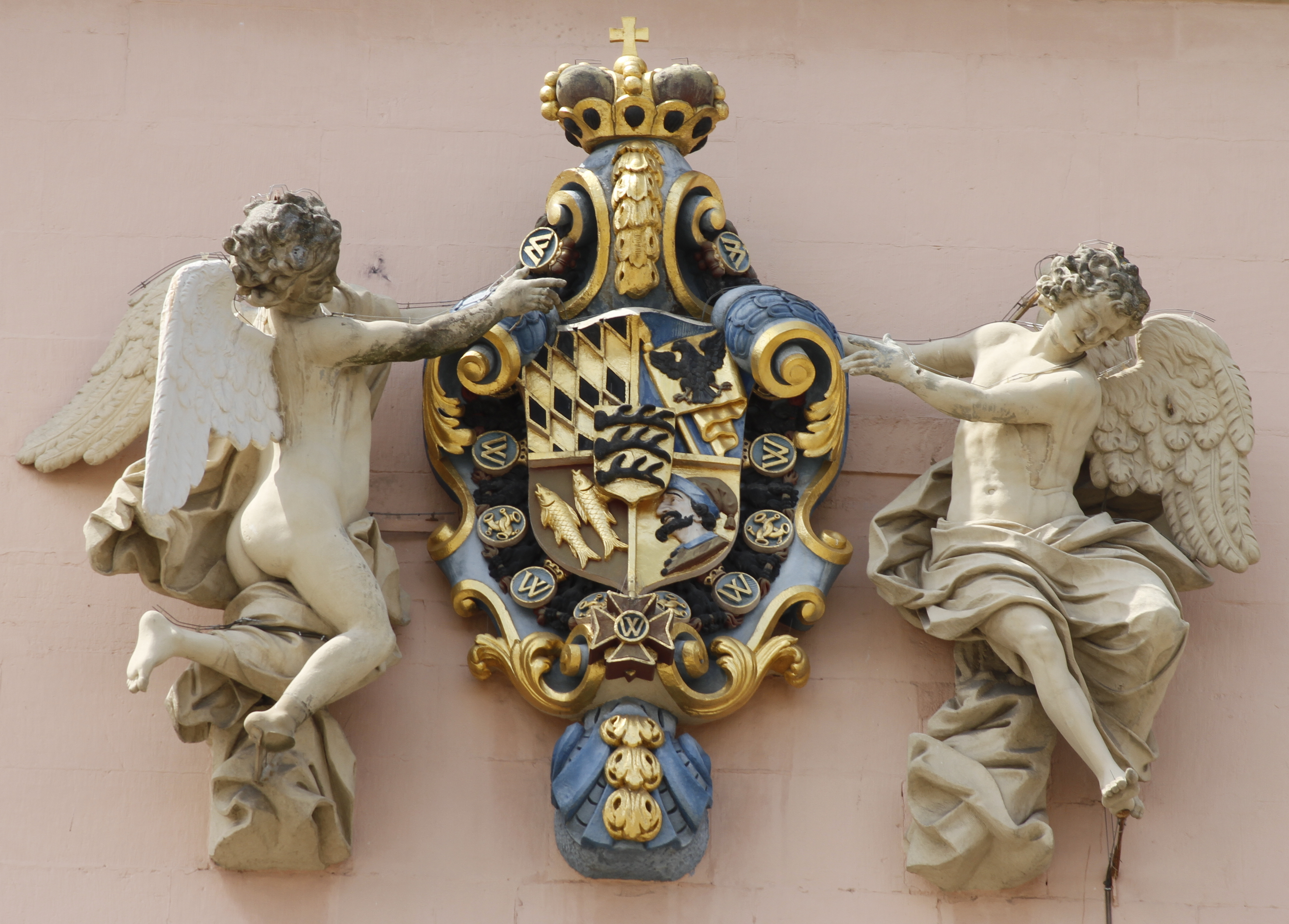
Coat of arms

Eberhard Louis was born in Stuttgart the third child of Duke William Louis and his wife, Magdalena Sibylla of Hesse-Darmstadt. After the early and unexpected death of his father in 1677, the royal court decided to give guardianship to his uncle, Frederick Charles, Duke of Württemberg-Winnental.

In 1693, Magdalena Sibylla had the 16-year-old Eberhard Louis prematurely proclaimed Duke of Württemberg by Emperor Leopold I. The young duke showed no excessive interest in governmental affairs. Eberhard Louis was described by his contemporaries as superficial and easily influenced. Most importantly, his behavior led to the political fate of the land being largely decided by his council. The duke preferred hunting and left the administration of his county in the hands his advisors. In 1697, he married Joanna Elisabeth of Baden-Durlach.

In 1707 he became the field marshal of the Swabian troops in the War of the Spanish Succession.

Shortly before 1700, he visited Louis XIV of France at the Palace of Versailles and planned to make Württemberg an absolutist state. He raised taxes, but financing still remained an obstacle. In 1704, he laid the foundation for his Ludwigsburg Palace. To save money, he allowed the workers to reside tax-free around the palace for 15 years. Later, the city of Ludwigsburg developed out of these residences.

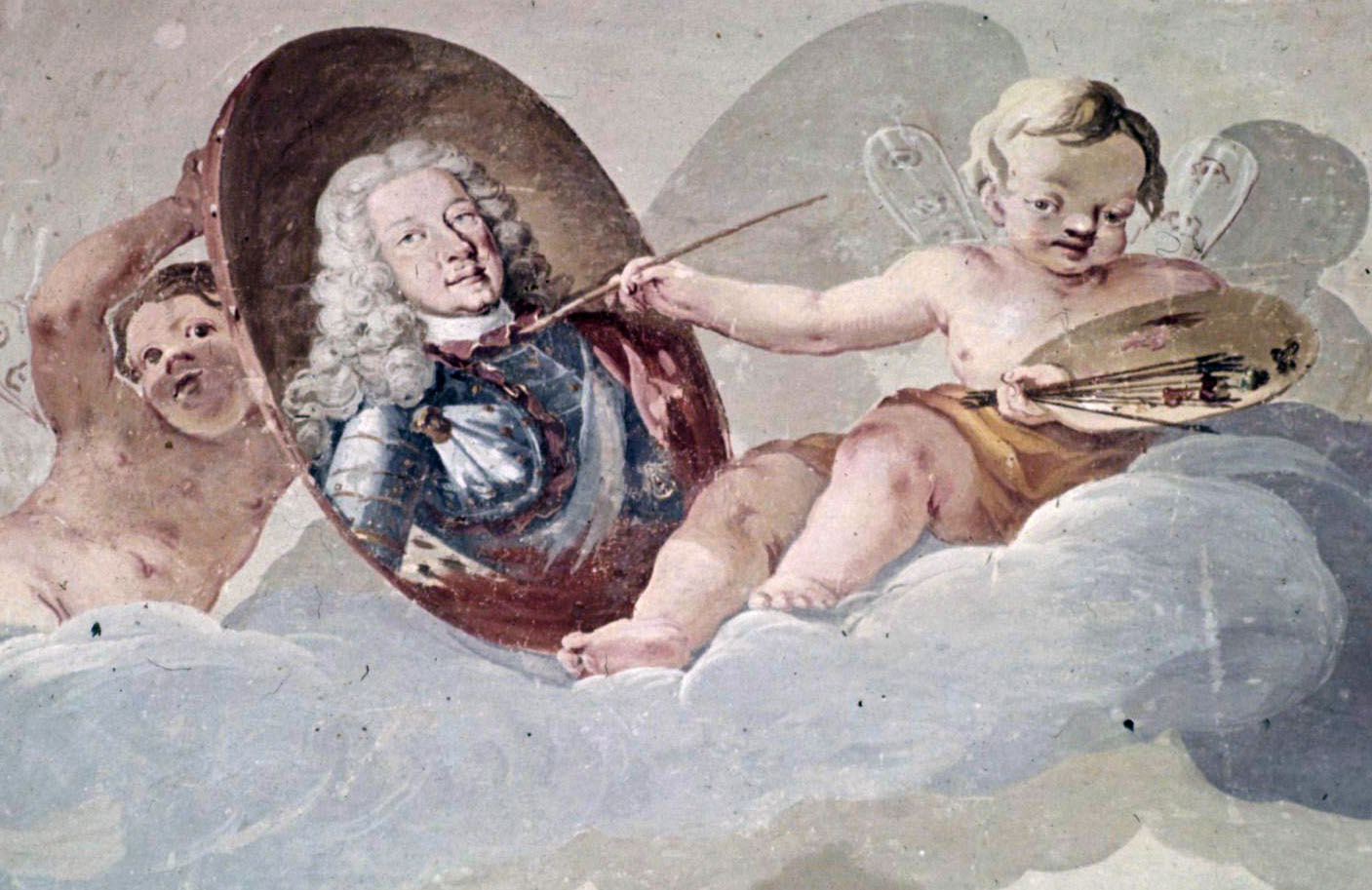
A cherub paints the portrait of Duke Eberhard Ludwig in this 1711 mural by Luca Antonio Colomba in the Ludwigsburg Palace.

As of 1711, Eberhard Louis spent ever more time in Ludwigsburg, usually in the company of his mistress, Wilhelmine von Grävenitz, whom he married in 1707. Because of pressure from the emperor, the marriage had to be quickly dissolved, and Grävenitz went into exile. Eberhard Louis followed her to Switzerland, where they stayed until 1710. The influential mistress was only allowed to return to the royal court once she had married another man, Count Johann Franz Ferdinand von Würben und Freudenthal (d. 1729). For over two decades, Grävenitz had a strong influence on the government of the land, and it was she who, together with Eberhard Ludwig, moved the royal residence and capital of the duchy from Stuttgart to the sparsely populated city of Ludwigsburg. Duchess Joanna Elisabeth of Baden-Durlach stayed in the royal palace in Stuttgart.

Because of the early death of his heir, Prince Frederick Louis, in 1731, the power threatened to shift into Catholic hands, which was unthinkable for Protestant Württemberg. Thus Duke Eberhard Louis dissolved his relations with Wilhelmine von Grävenitz and hoped to receive an heir from his legitimate and long ignored wife, Joanna Elisabeth. However, as he died in Ludwigsburg of a stroke on 31 October 1733, he left no heir behind. The duchy then fell into the hands of his converted cousin, Charles Alexander, Duke of Württemberg of the bloodline Württemberg-Winnental, though only for a few years.

== Tolerance ==
For his time, Eberhard Louis was a very tolerant ruler, commonly noted by modern scholars as "enlightened." An example of this is the hiring of Oberkapellmeister Johann Christoph Pez, a Roman Catholic, whom Eberhard Louis guaranteed freedom from religious persecution.

== Citations ==
Eberhard Louis, Duke of Württemberg House of Württemberg Born: 18 September 1676 Died: 31 October 1733
Regnal titles
Preceded by William Louis	Duke of Württemberg; 1677–1733	Succeeded by Charles I Alexander
