= William Louis, Duke of Württemberg =

Duke of Württemberg from 1674 to 1677

William Louis
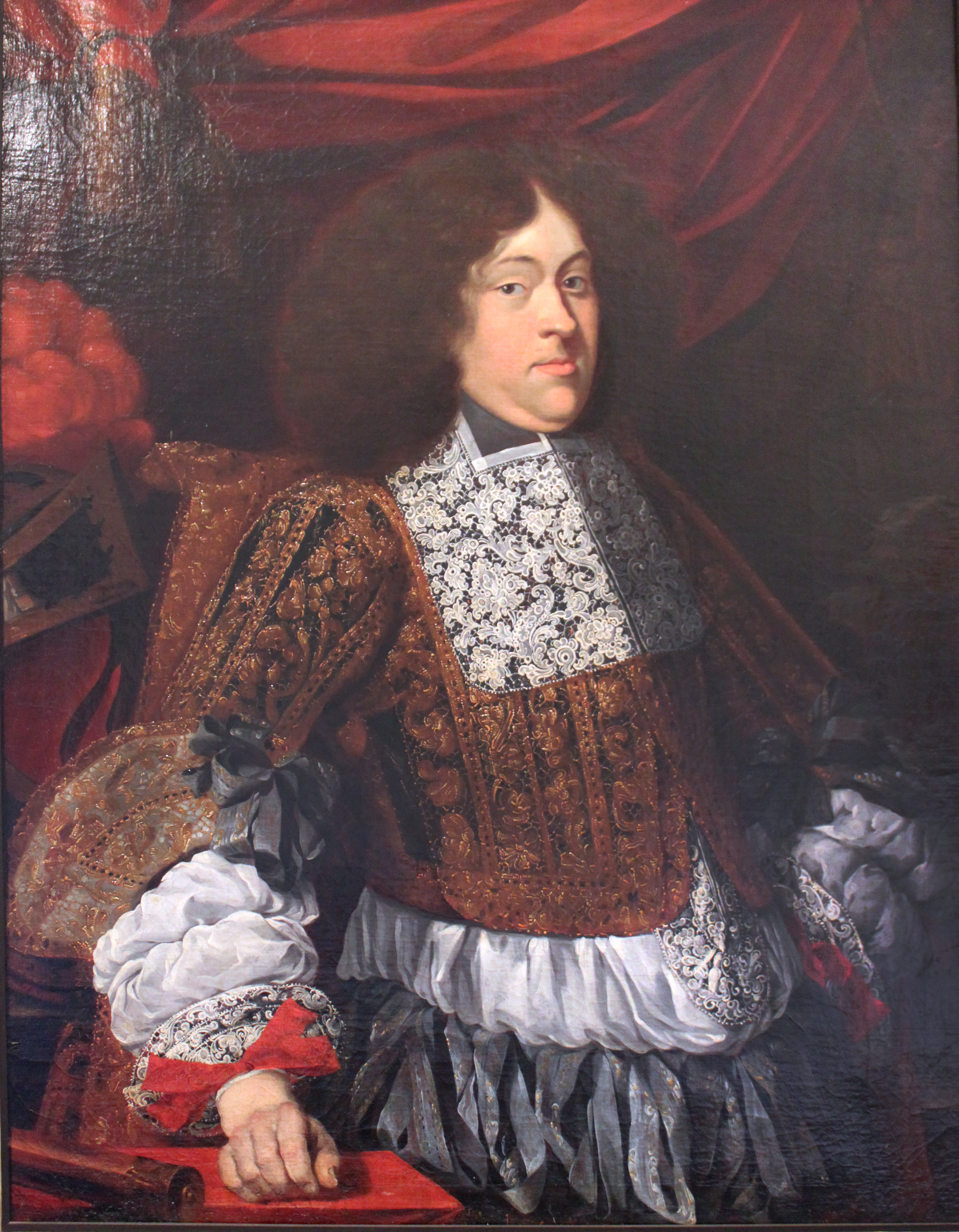
- William Louis, c. 1670

Duke of Württemberg
- Reign: 2 July 1674 – 23 June 1677
- Predecessor: Eberhard III
- Successor: Eberhard Louis
- Born: 7 January 1647; Stuttgart
- Died: 23 June 1677 (aged 30); Hirsau Castle
- Spouse: Magdalena Sibylla of Hesse-Darmstadt (m. 1673)
- Issue: Eleonore Dorothea; Eberhardine Luise; Eberhard Louis, Duke of Württemberg; Magdalena Wilhelmine, Margravine of Baden-Durlach
- House: Württemberg
- Father: Eberhard III, Duke of Württemberg
- Mother: Anna Catharina of Salm-Kyrburg

William Louis (7 January 1647 – 23 June 1677) was Duke of Württemberg from 1674 until his death in 1677.

William Louis was born in Stuttgart, the ninth child of Eberhard III, Duke of Württemberg, and his first wife Anna Catharina of Salm-Kyrburg.

At the age of 30, the Duke died unexpectedly of a heart attack at the stop-over in Schloß Hirsau. His widow Magdalena Sibylla became regent of Württemberg between 1677 and 1693, until her son reached adulthood.

== Issue ==
He married on 6 November 1673 in Darmstadt with Magdalena Sibylla of Hesse-Darmstadt, and had 4 children:

- Eleonore Dorothea (14 August 1674 – 26 May 1683).
- Eberhardine Luise (11 October 1675 – 26 March 1707).
- Eberhard Ludwig (19 September 1676 – 31 October 1733), next Duke of Württemberg.
- Magdalena Wilhelmine (7 November 1677 – 30 October 1742), married Charles III William, Margrave of Baden-Durlach.

William Louis, Duke of Württemberg House of Württemberg Born: 7 January 1647 Died: 23 June 1677
Regnal titles
Preceded by Eberhard III	Duke of Württemberg; 1674–1677	Succeeded by Eberhard Louis
