= Bernhard Gustav of Baden-Durlach =

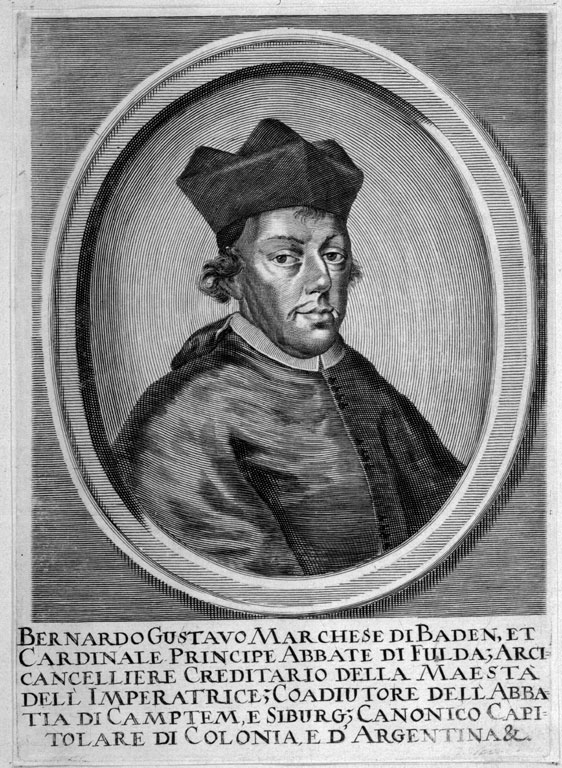
- Bernhard Gustav of Baden-Durlach
- Born: 24 December 1631; Karlsburg Castle in Durlach
- Died: 26 December 1677 (aged 46); Hammelburg
- Buried: Hammelburg
- Noble family: House of Zähringen
- Father: Frederick V, Margrave of Baden-Durlach
- Mother: Eleonore of Solms-Laubach

Bernhard Gustav von Baden-Durlach OSB (24 December 1631 at Karlsburg Castle in Durlach – 26 December 1677 in Hammelburg) was a Major General in the Swedish army. After his conversion to Catholicism, he was Abbot of Fulda and Kempten Abbey and also cardinal.

== Life ==
He was the son of Margrave Frederick V of Baden-Durlach and his second wife Eleonore of Solms-Laubach. He was the godson of King Gustavus Adolphus of Sweden. He was baptized as Gustav Adolph and raised in the Lutheran faith.

As a Major General in the Swedish army, he fought against Poland during the Second Northern War. After traveling through France and Italy and a lengthy stay in Rome, he converted to Catholicism on 24 August 1660 in the Franciscan Hermolsheim monastery in Mutzig in the Lower Alsace. He took the name of Bernhard Gustav, in honor of the Margrave Bernhard II.

In 1663, the joined the Venetian army and fought in the Turkish War. A year later, he fought in the battle of St. Gotthard. In 1665, he laid down his arms, entered the Benedictine Rheinau Abbey and received minor orders. In 1666, he was appointed coadjutor of the prince-bishop of Fulda. In 1668, he also became coadjutor of Kempten Abbey. In 1671, he became Prince-Bishop in Fulda and coadjutor in the Michaelsberg Abbey in Siegburg.

On 24 August 1671, Pope Clement X made him cardinal of Santa Susanna. In 1676, he participated in the conclave that elected Pope Innocent XI.

He died on 26 December 1677 in Hammelburg and was buried there.

Bernhard Gustav of Baden-Durlach House of Zähringen Born: 24 December 1631 Died: 26 December 1677
Preceded by Joachim of Gravenvegg	Prince Abbot of Fulda; 1671-1677	Succeeded by Placidus of Droste
Preceded by Roman Giel of Gielsberg	Prince-Abbot of Kempten; 1673-1677	Succeeded by Rupert II of Bodman
