= Wasserschloss Steinen =

Fortified house in Germany

Coordinates: 47°44′16.25″N 07°41′19.91″E

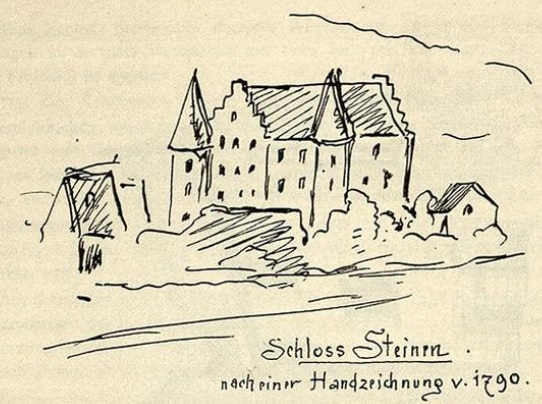
Schloss Steinen 1790

The Wasserschloss Steinen (Steinen moated castle) is a fortified house in the northern part of the village Steinen in the district Lörrach.

== Description ==
The main building is rectangular and has three stories and a polygonal stair tower. On its western side there are two round corner towers. The stepped gable, which can be seen on the sketch from 1790 do no longer exist. Apparently there used to be a tithe barn bearing the date 1602, which came off. The castle was once surrounded by a moat with water from the nearby stream Steinebach.

== History ==
Around 1350 an Estate of the St. Blaise Abbey considerable property in Steinen. This Estate is believed to have evolved out of an old castle. It is not known whether the Estate was already in the moated castle mentioned later and what damage the Basel earthquake of 1356 caused here. Not until the middle of the 16th century is there any news about the castle. In 1563 the moated castle was completely renovated by Gregorius Krafft of Dellmensingen. The year 1563 carved into the entrance door and a window jamb on the south side testify to this conversion.

In 1574 Krafft sold the castle to Wilhelm von Heidegg. He immediately withdrew from the purchase when he found out about the massive debts that weighed on the construction. The subsequent processes were only ended in 1580 by settlement.

However, since 1571 at the latest, the rulership of the village Steinen was in the hands of the Margraves of Baden-Durlach.

In 1597 the land clerk and privy councilor, Joseph Hettler, owned the castle as well as the associated estate and mill. He received a charter from the margrave, which exempted him from some taxes. When Hettler became chancellor of Ernest Frederick in 1599, he had to change his place of residence and sold his castle in Steinen to Christoph Daniel of Anweil, who was mentioned as the owner in 1605 and 1618. From 1620 to 1632 the forester Jakob of Rotberg owned the castle. Around 1640 the castle came to the margrave of Baden-Durlach. In 1652, Frederick V sold the castle to Christoph of Lauternau zu Schöfflanden, with the castle in a very poor structural condition. Of Lauternau acquired further goods and invested in the castle. However, he died in 1662. His heirs sold the castle in 1668 to Frederick VI. The use of the castle over the next decade remains unclear.

After Rötteln Castle, the administrative center of the Markgräflerland, was destroyed by French troops on June 29, 1678, the margravial administration looked for new accommodation for the various authorities. While the bailiff and the land clerk's office were soon relocated to the village Lörrach, the castle bailiff (responsible for the collection of deductibles and tithes) first came to the castle in Steinen, where they remained for about three years. Later, the castle bailiff was in the Wettinger Hof in Basel for a while, which had been bought by the Margrave in 1686. It was not until 1697 that all sovereign and spiritual offices were housed in Lörrach and in 1731 the castle bailiff moved into the new building in the courtyard in Lörrach.

In 1697 the castle was sold by Frederick VII to Friedrich de Rougemont, the mayor of La Chaux-de-Fonds and received a letter of liberty for himself and his three sisters, which granted him privileges and extensive exemption from taxes. The widow Rose de Rougemont wanted to sell the castle to a citizen of Basel in 1715, but the margravial administration objected and bought back the property in 1716. Instead, the castle and estate were leased to, Hans Casper Knauß, a citizen of Basel until 1726 and he used them until 1728. The margravial administration was constantly looking for tenants who offered more interest but could not find anyone. Knauß got because of the various necessary repairs and the low yields - For centuries, most of the owners and leaseholders of the castle estate complained about that - increasingly in financial difficulties. In 1728 the Hirschenwirt of Steinen, Friedrich Volz, took over the castle as a tenant. In 1736 Pastor Fecht became the new tenant, but after his transfer to Wollbach he looked for sub-tenants. After no general tenant or buyer could be found at the desired conditions, the margravial guardianship government under Prince Karl August proceeded to auction the individual parts of the estate in November 1745, which went to 36 citizens. The castle itself was bought by the schoolmaster, Ludwig Winter. After his death it passed to three families in which it was inherited, divided, and reunited. In 1888 Wilhelm Friedrich Reinau bought the castle and converted it into a representative residence.

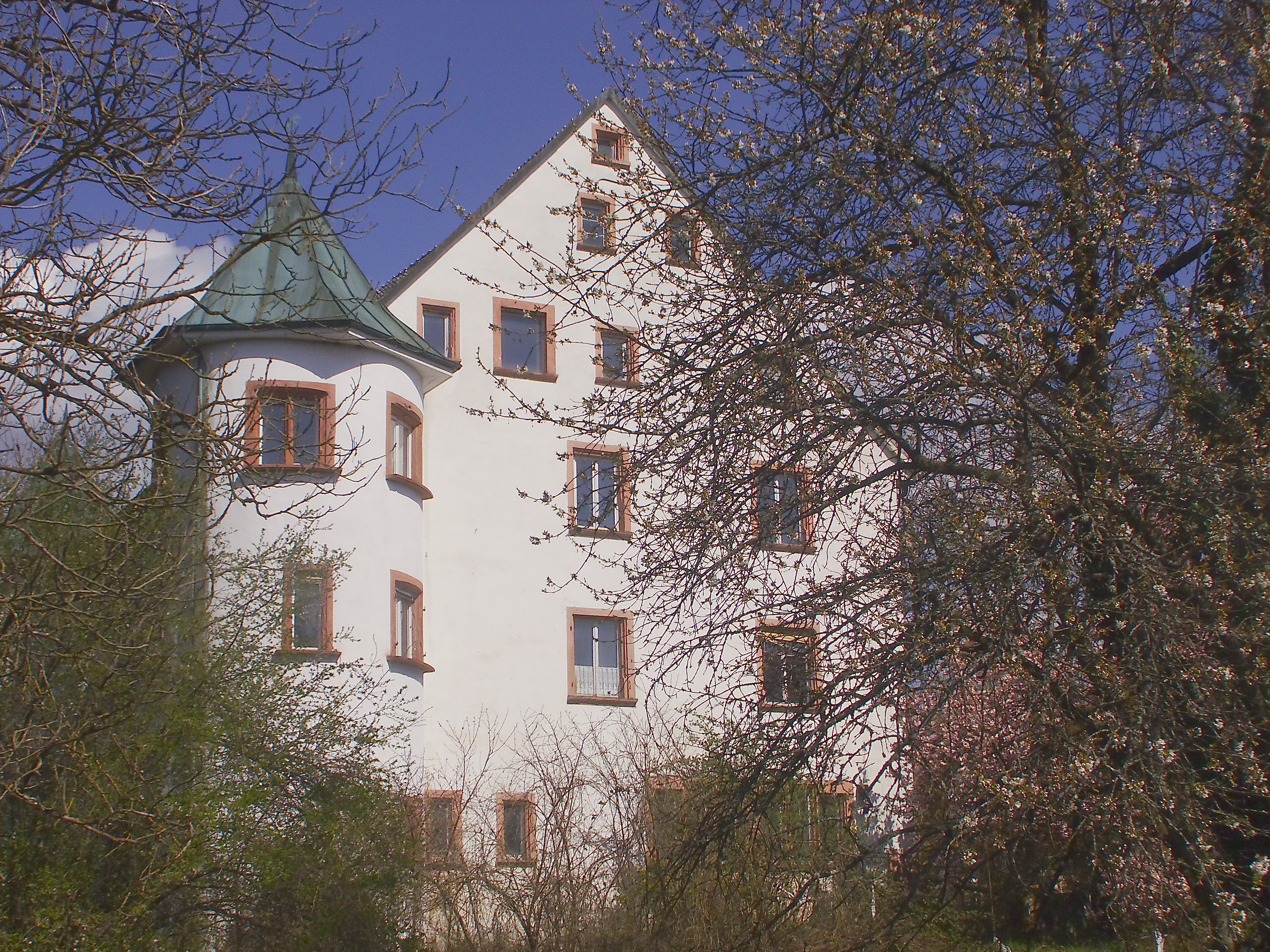
Schloss Steinen 2015

== Today ==
In 2015, the castle was no longer in good condition from the outside but was still inhabited. Renovation started in August 2015. The investor Götz Rehn wanted to create nine rental apartments. To gain space, dormer windows should also be installed. The monument protection authority and the municipality gave their approval for the project. The planning office Artifex, which has already accompanied construction measures at the Goetheanum in Dornach was responsible for the conception of the renovation. The renovation was completed in mid-2017. Today there are nine private apartments in the building.
