= Christine Juliane of Baden-Durlach =

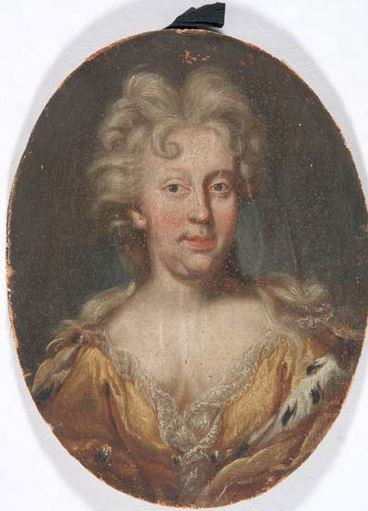

Duchess consort of Saxe-Eisenach
- Tenure: 1698–1707
- Born: 12 September 1678; Karlsburg Castle, Durlach
- Died: 10 July 1707 (aged 28); Eisenach
- Spouse: John William III, Duke of Saxe-Eisenach
- Issue: Johannetta Antoinette Juliane, Princess of Saxe-Weissenfels; Caroline Christine, Landgravine of Hesse-Philippsthal; Princess Charlotte Wilhelmine Juliane
- House: House of Zähringen
- Father: Charles Gustav of Baden-Durlach
- Mother: Anna Sophia of Brunswick-Wolfenbüttel

Christine Juliane of Baden-Durlach (12 September 1678 – 10 July 1707), was a German noblewoman of the House of Zähringen and by marriage Duchess of Saxe-Eisenach.

== Early life ==
Born at Karlsburg Castle in Karlsruhe, Durlach, she was the oldest of the four children of Prince Charles Gustav of Baden-Durlach (younger brother of Frederick VII, Margrave of Baden-Durlach) and his wife, Princess Anna Sophia of Brunswick-Wolfenbüttel.

== Biography ==
The only surviving child of her parents (her three younger brothers all died in infancy), in Wolfenbüttel on 27 February 1697 she married Prince John William of Saxe-Eisenach (younger brother of Duke John George II) as his second wife. One year later (10 November 1698), her husband inherited the Duchy of Saxe-Eisenach after his brother's death without issue.

During her marriage, Christine Juliane gave birth seven children, of whom only three survived to adulthood:

1. Johannetta Antoinette Juliane (Jena, 31 January 1698 - Schloss Dahme, 13 April 1726), married on 9 May 1721 to Prince Johann Adolf of Saxe-Weissenfels (who in 1734 inherited the Duchy from his childless brother).
2. Caroline Christine (Jena, 15 April 1699 - Philippsthal, 25 July 1743), married on 24 November 1725 to Charles I, Landgrave of Hesse-Philippsthal.
3. Anton Gustav (Eisenach, 12 August 1700 - Eisenach, 4 October 1710).
4. Charlotte Wilhelmine Juliane (Eisenach, 27 June 1703 - Erfurt, 17 August 1774), unmarried.
5. Johannetta Wilhelmine Juliane (Eisenach, 10 September 1704 - Eisenach, 3 January 1705).
6. Charles William (Eisenach, 9 January 1706 - Eisenach, 24 February 1706).
7. Charles August (Eisenach, 10 June 1707 - Eisenach, 22 February 1711).

One month after her last childbirth, Christine Juliane died in Eisenach, aged 28. She was buried in the Georgenkirche, Eisenach.

Christine Juliane of Baden-Durlach House of Zähringen Born: 12 September 1678 Died: 10 July 1707
German royalty
Preceded by Sophie Charlotte of Württemberg	Duchess consort of Saxe-Eisenach; 1698-1707	Vacant Title next held by Magdalene Sibylle of Saxe-Weissenfels
