= Red Castle =

Red Castle or Redcastle may refer to:

- Red Castle (Utah), a mountain in Utah, USA
- Red Castle of Tripoli, Libya
  - Red Castle Museum
- Red Castle, Angus, Scotland at Lunan Bay
- Redcastle, Highland, Scotland on the Black Isle in what was Easter Ross
- Redcastle, County Donegal, a small village in County Donegal, Ireland
- Red Castle, Vsevolozhsk, Russia
- Red Castle, Shropshire, a ruin at Hawkstone Park, near Weston-under-Redcastle, Shropshire, England
- Redcastle, New Zealand, suburb of Oamaru

== See also ==
- Red Fort, Delhi
- Agra Fort, also known as the Red Fort
- Château Rouge in Belgium
- Château-Rouge in Moselle, France
- Château Rouge station, a Paris Metro station
- Rotenburg (disambiguation), meaning Red Castle in German
- Akagi (disambiguation), meaning Red Castle in Japanese
- Kastellorizo, whose name may come from the Italian castello rosso
- La Muralla Roja, a housing complex in Spain
- Castell Coch, a 19th-century Gothic Revival castle built above an older castle at Tongwynlais in South Wales
- St Kevin's College, Oamaru, also called Redcastle
- Kellereischloss, Bavaria, Germany, also known as Red Castle (German: Rotes Schloss)
- Waldsteinburg, Bavaria, Germany, also known as Red Castle (German: Rotes Schloss)
- Phanar Greek Orthodox College in Istanbul, also known as "Red Castle"
