= Marie Christine Felizitas of Leiningen-Dagsburg-Falkenburg-Heidesheim =

Duchess consort of Saxe-Eisenach
- Tenure: 1727–1729
- Born: 29 December 1692; Broich Castle, Mülheim an der Ruhr
- Died: 3 June 1734 (aged 41); Eisenach
- Spouse: Prince Christopher of Baden-Durlach; John William III, Duke of Saxe-Eisenach
- Issue: Prince Karl August of Baden-Durlach; Prince Karl William Eugen of Baden-Durlach; Prince Christopher of Baden-Durlach
- House: Leiningen
- Father: Johann Karl August, Count of Leiningen-Dagsburg-Falkenburg-Heidesheim
- Mother: Johanna Magdalene of Hanau-Lichtenberg

Marie Christine Felizitas of Leiningen-Dagsburg-Falkenburg-Heidesheim (29 December 1692 – 3 June 1734), was a German noblewoman member of the House of Leiningen and by her two marriages Princess of Baden-Durlach and Duchess of Saxe-Eisenach.

Born in Broich Castle, Mülheim an der Ruhr, she was the fourth from seven children of Johann Karl August, Count of Leiningen-Dagsburg-Falkenburg-Heidesheim and Lord of Broich and Bürgel by his wife Countess Johanna Magdalene of Hanau-Lichtenberg. From Marie Christine's six older and younger siblings, only three survive adulthood: one sister, Sophie Magdalene (by marriage Countess of Salm-Grumbach) and two brothers, Christian Karl Reinhard and Johann Wilhelm Ludwig.

== Life ==
In Heidesheim on 1 December 1711, Marie Christine married firstly Prince Christopher, younger brother of Charles III William, Margrave of Baden-Durlach. They had three sons:

1. Prince Charles August of Baden-Durlach (Durlach, 14 November 1712 – Durlach, 30 September 1786), later ruler of Baden-Durlach (guardianship government for Charles Frederick); married Juliane Schmid (later Baroness of Ehrenberg; 1753 - 1815)
2. Prince Charles William Eugen of Baden-Durlach (Karlsburg Castle, 3 November 1713 – Graben, 9 May 1783), had a military career; from 1743 he was a member of the guardianship authorities (guardianship government for Charles Frederick) of Baden-Durlach with his brother. Died unmarried and childless.
3. Prince Christopher of Baden-Durlach (Durlach, 5 June 1717 – Karlsruhe, 18 December 1789), married on 28 November 1779 Katharina Höllischer (later Baroness of Freydorf; 26 June 1745 – 23 July 1811).

After eleven years of marriage, Prince Christopher of Baden died on 2 May 1723 and was buried in the Stiftskirche St.Michael, Pforzheim.

In Philippsruhe Castle, Hanau on 29 May 1727 Marie Christine married secondly John William, Duke of Saxe-Eisenach as his fourth wife. The union lasted only twenty months until his death on 14 January 1729. They had no children.

Marie Christine died in Eisenach aged 41. She was buried in the Georgenkirche, Eisenach.

== Notes ==
Marie Christine Felizitas of Leiningen-Dagsburg-Falkenburg-Heidesheim House of Leiningen Born: 29 December 1692 Died: 3 June 1734
German royalty
Vacant Title last held by Magdalene Sibylle of Saxe-Weissenfels	Duchess consort of Saxe-Eisenach; 1727–1729	Succeeded by Anna Sophie Charlotte of Brandenburg-Schwedt
