= Magdalene Sibylle of Saxe-Weissenfels =

Magdalene Sibylle of Saxe-Weissenfels may refer to:

- Magdalena Sibylle of Saxe-Weissenfels (1648–1681), German noblewoman
- Magdalene Sibylle of Saxe-Weissenfels (1673–1726), German noblewoman
