= John George II =

John George II may refer to:

- John George II, Elector of Saxony (1613–1680)
- John George II, Prince of Anhalt-Dessau (1627–1693)
- John George II, Duke of Saxe-Eisenach (1665–1698)
