= Charles Gustav of Baden-Durlach =

German general

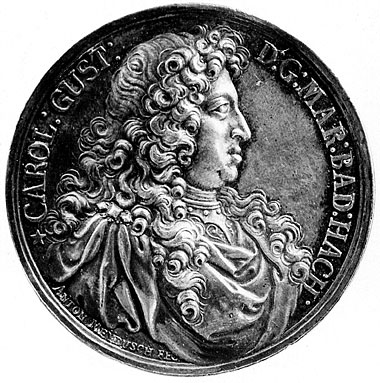
- Born: 27 September 1648; Durlach
- Died: 24 October 1703 (aged 55); Karlsburg Castle in Durlach
- Spouse: Princess Anna Sophie of Brunswick-Wolfenbüttel
- Issue Detail: Christine Juliane
- House: House of Zähringen
- Father: Frederick VI, Margrave of Baden-Durlach
- Mother: Christina Magdalena of the Palatinate-Zweibrücken

Margrave (Prince) Charles Gustav of Baden-Durlach (27 September 1648 in Durlach – 24 October 1703 at the Karlsburg Castle in Durlach) was a German general. He was the son of Margrave Frederick VI of Baden-Durlach and his wife Christina Magdalena of the Palatinate-Zweibrücken, sister of King Charles X Gustav of Sweden.

Within the Swabian Circle he was royal colonel of the Protestant Circle Infantry Regiment (1673–1677) and from 1683 of the Second Circle Infantry Regiment (Evangelical). In 1683, he served as major general and at the same time commander-in-chief of the circle troops. In 1686 he was promoted to field marshal lieutenant of the infantry in the Swabian Circle, in 1692 to General Feldzeugmeister and in 1697 to field marshal.

== Marriage and issue ==
Margrave Charles Gustav married on 28 October 1677 with Princess Anna Sophie of Brunswick-Wolfenbüttel (29 October 1659 – 28 June 1742), the daughter of the Duke Anton Ulrich of Brunswick-Wolfenbüttel. They had the following children:

- Christine Juliane (12 September 1678 – 10 July 1707), married on 27 February 1697 John William III, Duke of Saxe-Eisenach.
- Charles (30 March 1680 – 30 August 1680).
- Frederick Rudolph (13 May 1681 – 18 May 1682).
- Charles Anton (29 January 1683 – 31 May 1692).
