= Barbara of Württemberg =

Margravine of Baden-Durlach (1593–1627)

- Margravine of Baden-Durlach
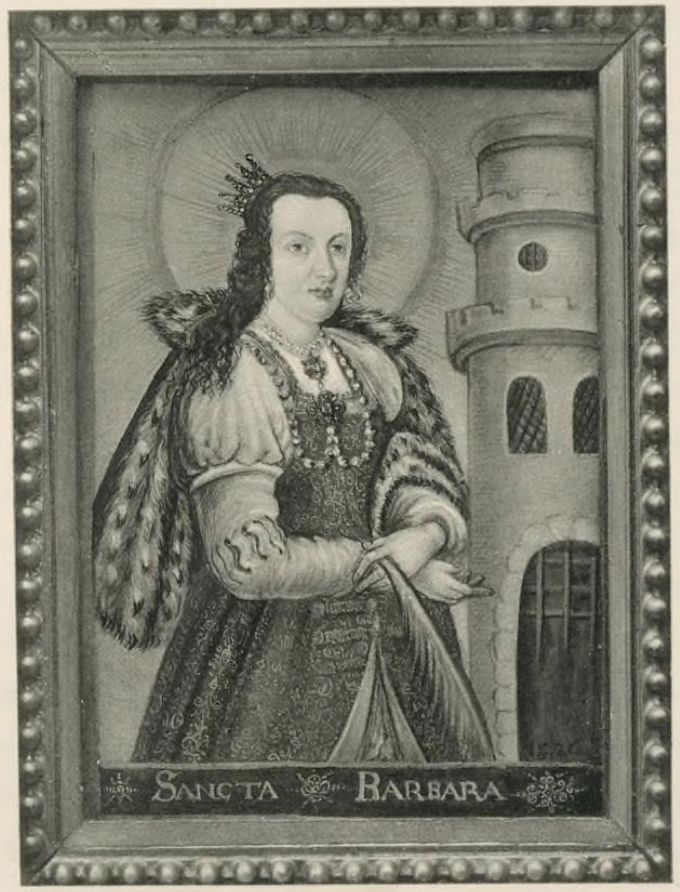
- Posthumous portrait (1653)
- Born: 4 December 1593
- Died: 8 May 1627 (aged 33)
- Spouse: Frederick V, Margrave of Baden-Durlach
- Issue: Frederick VI; Sibylle; Charles Magnus; Barbara; Johanna; Friederike; Christine
- House: House of Württemberg
- Father: Frederick I, Duke of Württemberg
- Mother: Sibylla of Anhalt

Barbara of Württemberg (4 December 1593 – 18 May 1627) was margravine of the historical German territory of Baden-Durlach. The daughter of Frederick I, Duke of Württemberg, and Sibylla of Anhalt, she was born a Duchess of Württemberg and became margravine after marrying Frederick V, Margrave of Baden-Durlach, in 1616. She is depicted as Saint Barbara in a posthumous miniature portrait.

== Life ==
At the age of 23, she married 22-year-old Frederick V, Margrave of Baden-Durlach, the eldest son of George Frederick, Margrave of Baden-Durlach. The wedding took place on 21 December 1616 in Stuttgart. Barbara was granted the domain of Ettlingen. The newlyweds settled in the Karlsburg Castle in Durlach. During the Thirty Years' War, her father-in-law abdicated in favor of Frederick V in April 1622. At the end of 1622, the couple fled with their five children to the court of Barbara's brother, John Frederick, Duke of Württemberg, in Stuttgart. Frederick managed to free his lands the following year, but already in 1624 the troops of the Catholic League invaded the country again and occupied Pforzheim. The family had to leave the margraviate once again.

== Death ==
Barbara died in Stuttgart on 8 May 1627, at the age of 33. At her funeral ceremony, the Threnodiae composed by court organist Eusebius Veit were performed. She was buried at the castle church of Pforzheim, where there is an epitaph to Barbara of Württemberg engraved in the floor of the choir.

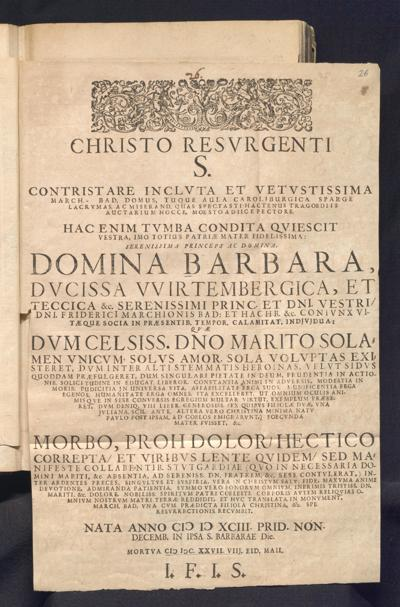
Obituary of Barbara, Margravine of Baden-Durlach (d. 8 May 1627)

== Portrait ==
In the miniature portrait, Barbara, margravine of Baden-Durlach, is depicted as her patron saint Barbara, exhibiting her attributes. In 1909, art historian Ernst Lembert suggested that the painter was a Nuremberg artist named Maria Eißler. However, in 1917, Hans Rott argued that Lembert had misread the signature, "JEDF 1653".

== Issue ==
Barbara was the first of five wives of Frederick V. She gave birth to two of his three sons, including Frederick VI, his successor. Their other son, Charles Magnus, fought for Sweden in the Thirty Years' War, as well as the Danish and Polish wars, and preceded his father in death by one year. The children of Barbara and Frederick included:

- Frederick VI (born: 16 November 1617; died: 31 January 1677), Imperial Commander and Margrave of Baden-Durlach (1617–1677)
- Sibylle (born: 4 November 1618; died: 7 July 1623)
- Charles Magnus (born: 27 March 1621; died: 29 November 1658)
- Barbara (born: 6 June 1622; died: 13 September 1639)
- Johanna (born: 5 December 1623; died: 2 January 1661), married:

firstly, on 26 September 1640 the Swedish Commander-in-Chief Johan Banér (born: 3 July 1596; died: 20 May 1641)
secondly, in 1648 to Count Heinrich von Thurn und Valsássina (died: 19 August 1656)

- Friederike (April 6, 1625; † June 16, 1645)
- Christine (born: 25 December 1626, died: 11 July 1627)
