= Untererthal =

- Ortsteil of Hammelburg
- Coat of arms
- Interactive map of Untererthal
- Location within Germany Location within Bavaria
- Coordinates: 50°08′48″N 9°52′47″E
- Country: Germany
- State: Bavaria
- Admin. region: Unterfranken
- District: Bad Kissingen
- Town: Hammelburg

Area
  - Total: 11.54 km^{2} (4.46 sq mi)

Population
  - Total: 971
  - Density: 84.1/km^{2} (218/sq mi)
- Time zone: UTC+01:00 (CET)
  - Summer (DST): UTC+02:00 (CEST)
- Postal codes: 97762
- Dialling codes: 09732
- Website: www.untererthal.de

Untererthal is a ward of the Bavarian town of Hammelburg in the Lower Franconian district of Bad Kissingen. The German Army's Infantry School (Infanterieschule) is located in neighboring Hammelburg.

== Geography ==
Untererthal is located to the north of Hammelburg.

Bundesstraße 27, or B 27, runs through Untererthal, heading south towards Hammelburg and north towards Bad Brückenau. The next locality on this road is Neuwirtshaus. The St 2291 exits Untererthal on the eastern side towards Thulba and, after a roundabout connecting St 2291 with Bundesautobahn 7, towards Oberthulba.

== History ==
Burial mounds near Büchelberg indicate an early settlement of the Untererthal region. The first known written mention of the town was on a deed dated January 7, 777 under the name "Harital". Untererthal was one of the gifts that Charlemagne gave to the Fulda Monastery.

The history of the town is closely intertwined with the Erthal family line. The Erthal family used to inhabit the castle "Erthal" that is no longer maintained and had a residence on the current Judenhof.

The Jewish community of the town emerged between the 16th and 17th centuries. The first known documentary evidence of this dates from the year 1524. The Jewish population of Untererthal stood under the protection of the lords of Erthal and inherited the entire castle square when the family seat was destroyed in 1796. While the Jewish dead were buried in the Jewish cemetery of Pfaffenhausen, the first mention of the local synagogue was in the year 1737. However, the synagogue was demolished because it was built illegally. In 1805 a prayer room was built in the Jewish quarter and was renovated in 1842.

Today's Bundesstraße 27 was crucial for the history of the town as it was an important north-south military route over which not only princes and merchants traveled to the area in order to trade, but also armies traveled during the Thirty Years' War, Napoleonic Wars and Austro-Prussian War.

Between 1926 and 1929 the church, which was built during the Romantic Period, was replaced through the construction of the Church of St. Martin.

As part of the infamous Kristallnacht the facilities of the synagogue were destroyed and rituals and services were stopped; however, the building had been left standing until 1945. A search by the district police of the Jewish households for hoarded food that took place on November 28 and 29, 1938 was inconclusive. In 1942, Jews from Untererthal were dorported to the Izbica Ghetto on April 22 and to the Concentration Camp in Theresienstadt in September.

During World War II, the neighboring town Hammelburg was the site of the POW Camps OFLAG XIII-B and Stalag XIII-C, as well as the attempted rescue of POW's from these camps by Task Force Baum in 1945. The American television sitcom Hogan's Heroes (which ran on CBS from 1965 to 1971), featured a fictional Stalag 13, said to be near Hammelburg, possibly in or near Untererthal.

Untererthal become a quarter of Hammelburg on January 1, 1972 after the Free State of Bavaria enacted municipal reforms.

== Historic Buildings ==
=== Church of St. Martin ===
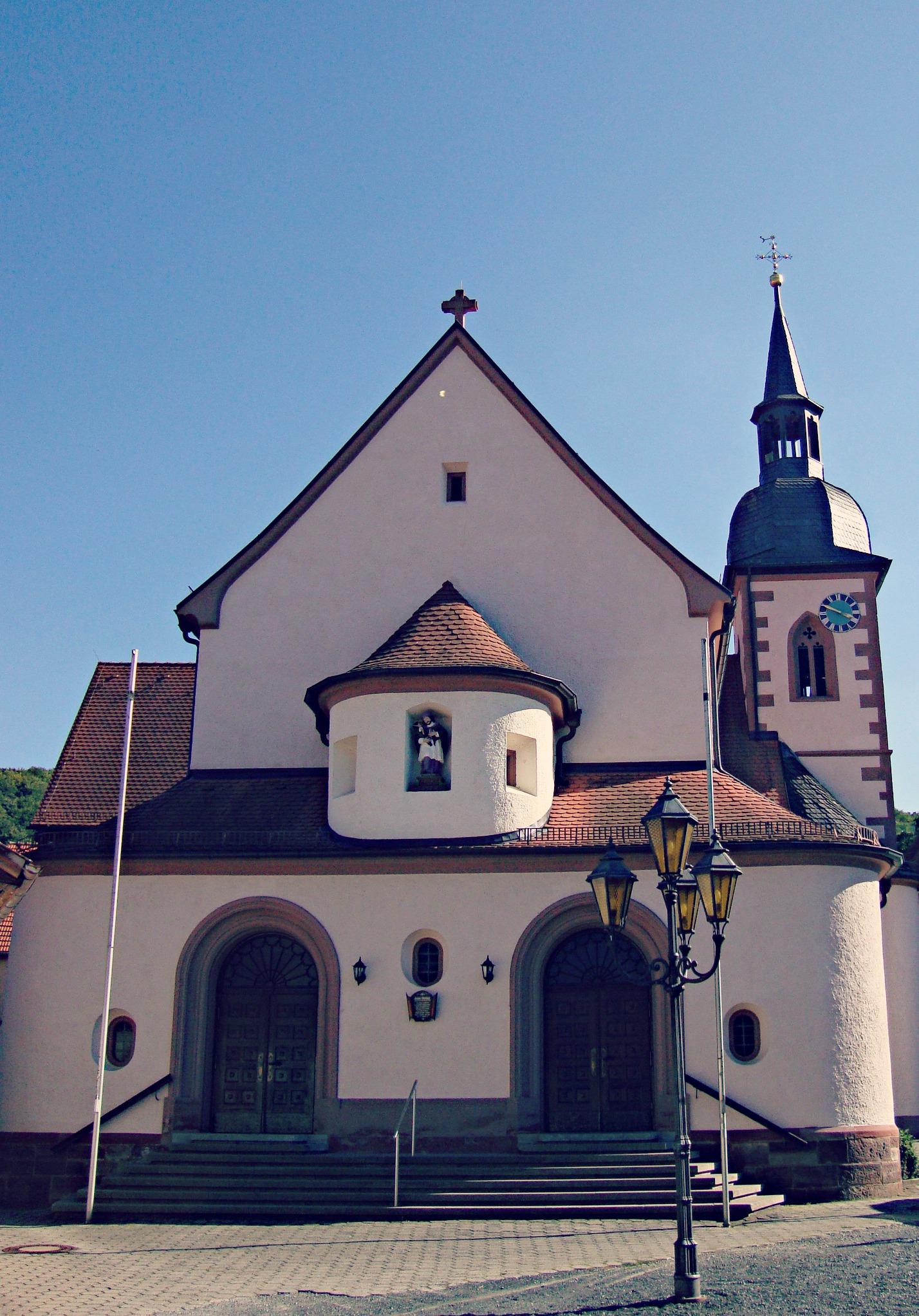
The Church of St. Martin in Untererthal.

It is uncertain as to whether there was already a church in Untererthal in the year 800 because the necessary evidence is lacking. However, the patronage of the church supposes the existence of a church at that time.

The first church in Untererthal was built at the end of the 11th Century by the Erthal family. Under Dietrich Georg von Erthal extensive rebuilding measures including a choir, nave and tower were undertaken in 1590.

The church proved to be too small for the growing number of Christians, and the construction of the Church of St. Martin began in 1926. The inauguration of the Church of St. Martin took place on May 5, 1929. Certain parts of the original church built in the Romanesque style still exist to this day and are part of the Church of St. Martin.

=== Landgasthof zum Goldenen Kreuz ===
Centuries ago, the then lords of Erthal claimed certain rights under the Schankrecht, which were laws during the late medieval period covering commercial rights to host guests in a restaurant/tavern. In exercising these rights, the lords of Erthal built a tavern in Untererthal, but it was not until 1548 that the first innkeeper, Hans Murk, was mentioned. Over the centuries, many other innkeepers followed in his footsteps.

In 1733, Johann Bau tore down the old building and constructed a larger inn in the baroque style. The arches at the entrance, keystones, window frames and other structural aspects all date to this period of construction and are still integral to the inn. However, the antique door is attributed to an unknown later date. It was at this time, in 1737, that it was first mentioned that the inn had a "golden cross" (guldenes Kreuz) in its decorative shield, thereby giving rise to the name Landgasthof zum Goldenen Kreuz.

Johann Josef Schäfer acquired the inn through marriage in 1895 and extended what is today the rear wing of the building. In 1910, renovations and extensions were carried out, and along with the construction carried out in 1733 these form the current structure of the Landgasthof zum Goldenen Kreuz. Due to the history of the inn and its architecture, it is currently protected by a preservation order.
