= Margrave Charles Magnus of Baden-Durlach =

Charles Magnus of Baden-Durlach
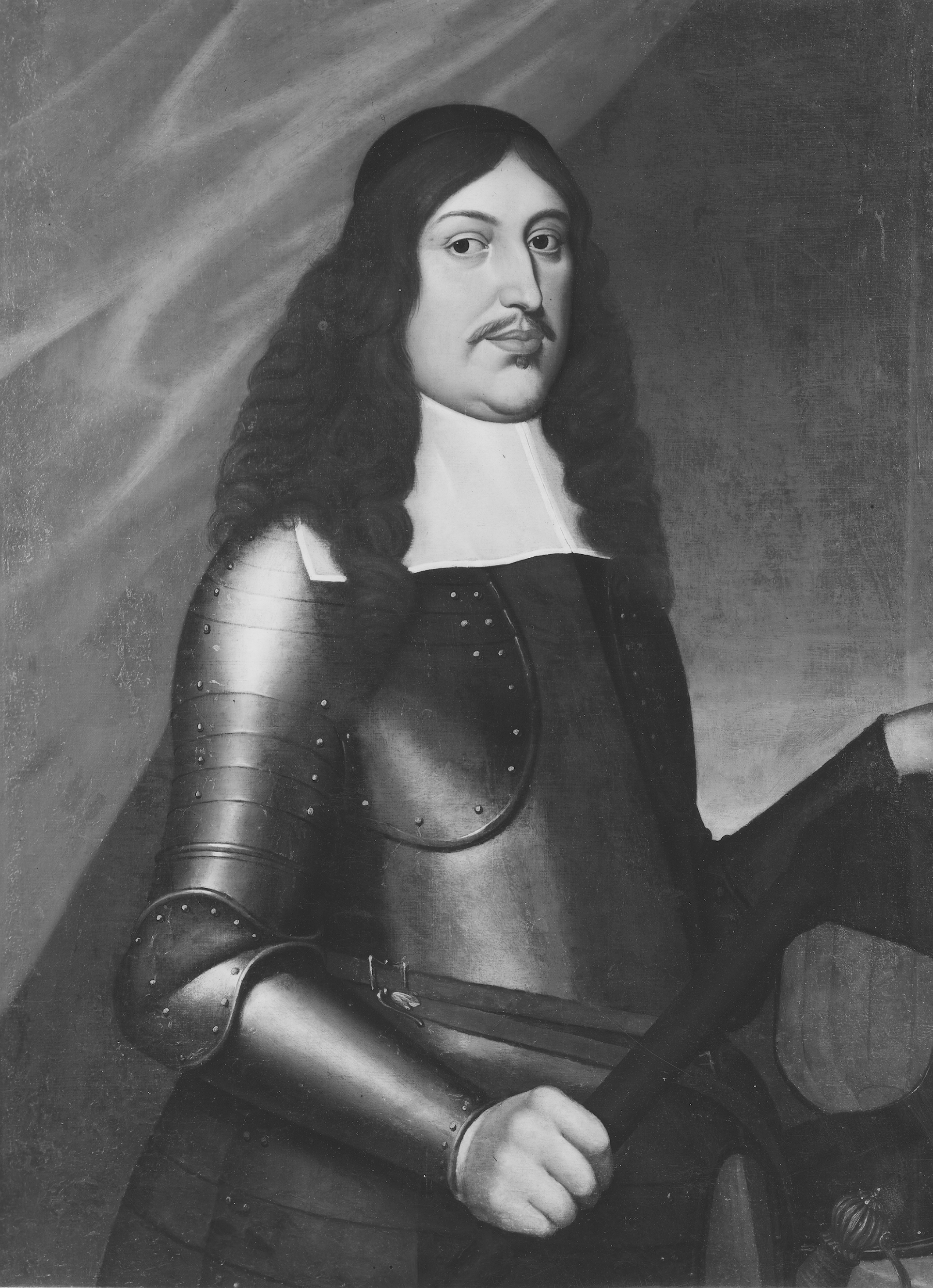
- Born: 27 March 1621; Karlsburg Castle in Durlach
- Died: 29 November 1658 (aged 37); Karlsburg Castle in Durlach
- Spouse: Marie Juliane of Hohenlohe-Waldenburg
- House: House of Zähringen
- Father: Frederick V, Margrave of Baden-Durlach
- Mother: Barbara of Württemberg

Margrave Charles Magnus of Baden-Durlach (27 March 1621 at Karlsburg Castle in Durlach – 29 November 1658, ibid.) was a titular Margrave of Baden.

Charles Magnus was the son from his first marriage of Margrave Frederick V of Baden and Barbara of Württemberg (4 December 1593 – 8 May 1627), the daughter of the Duke Frederick I of Württemberg.

He married on 23 January 1650 in Schillingsfürst with Countess Marie Juliane of Hohenlohe-Waldenburg (23 March 1622 – 1675), the daughter of Count George Frederick II of Hohenlohe-Waldenburg. They had the following children:

- Charles Frederick (11 January 1651 – 5 October 1676), a member of the Sovereign Military Order of Malta
- Charlotte Sophie (13 September 1652 – 18 January 1678)

married on 24 February 1676 Count Emich XIV of Leiningen-Hartenburg (6 February 1649 – 13 December 1684)

- Barbara Eleanor (12 June 1657 – 4 November 1658)
- Friedericke Christine (1658 – March 1659)
