= Frederick V of Baden-Durlach =

German nobleman

Frederick V, Margrave of Baden-Durlach
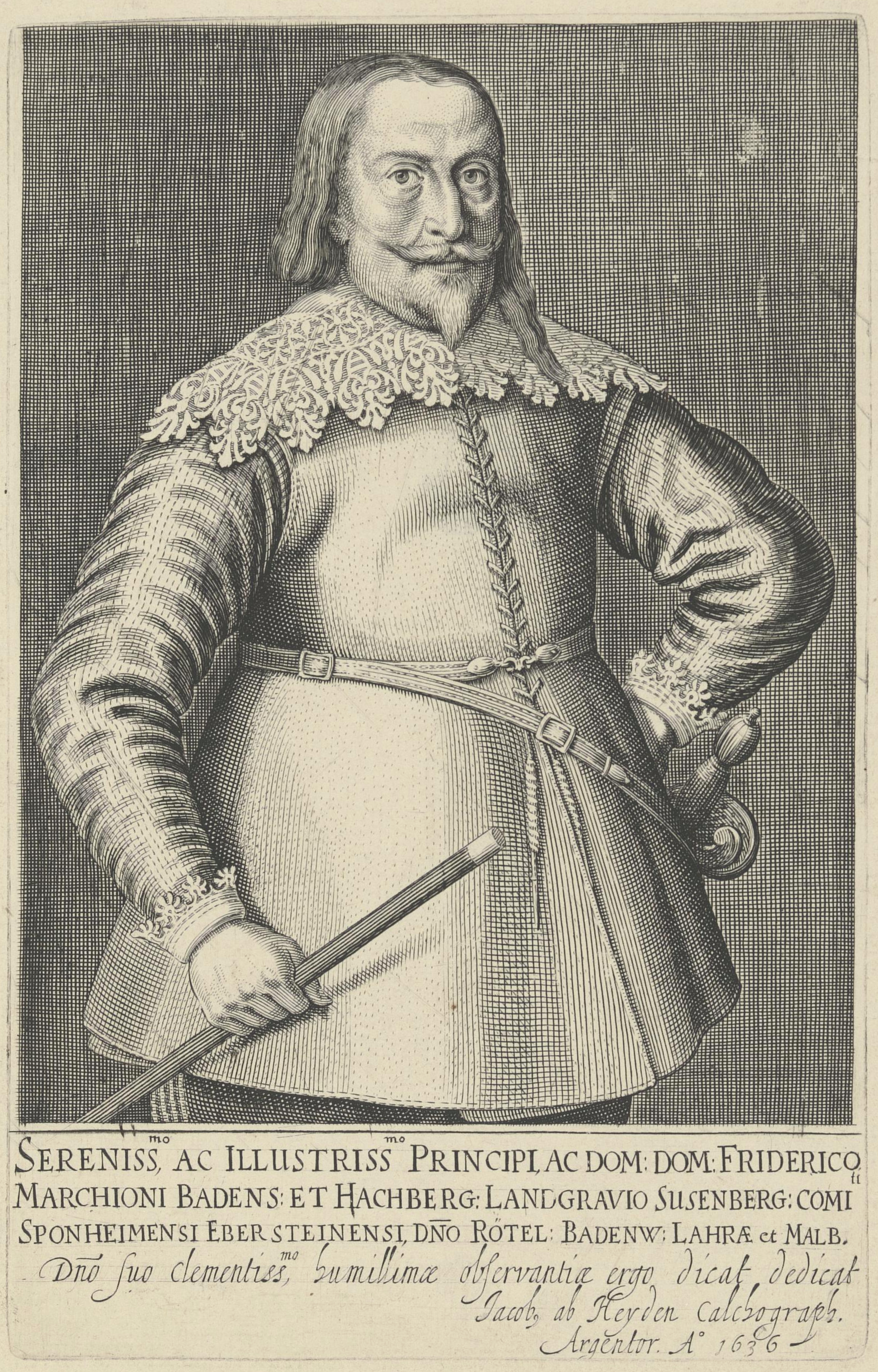
- Frederick V, Margrave of Baden-Durlach
- Born: 6 July 1594; Sulzburg, in the Black Forest
- Died: 8 September 1659 (aged 65); Durlach
- Noble family: House of Zähringen
- Spouses: Barbara of Württemberg; Eleonore of Solms-Laubach; Maria Elisabeth of Waldeck-Eisenberg; Anna Maria von Hohen-Geroldseck; Elisabeth Eusebia of Fürstenberg
- Father: George Frederick, Margrave of Baden-Durlach
- Mother: Juliana Ursula of Salm-Neufville

Frederick V, Margrave of Baden-Durlach (6 July 1594, Sulzburg, Hochschwarzwald – 8 September 1659, Durlach) was a German nobleman, who ruled as margrave of Baden-Durlach from 1622 to his death. He was succeeded by his son Frederick VI, Margrave of Baden-Durlach.

== Life ==
Frederick V was the son of Margrave George Frederick of Baden-Durlach and his wife Juliana Ursula of Salm-Neufville. He was educated in Sulzburg by, among others, superintendent J. Weininger. In the years 1613 and 1614, Frederick V made his Grand Tour to France, Great Britain and the Netherlands.

In 1622, the Aulic Council decided to award the margraviate of Baden-Baden to Edward Fortunatus. Disappointed, Margrave George Frederick abdicated on 22 April 1622, in favour of his son, Frederick V. Frederick ruled Baden Durlach until his death in 1659.

After Baden-Durlach lost the Battle of Wimpfen, the country was devastated by the troops of Tilly. Durlach and other unprotected towns were burned down or looted and pillaged repeatedly. Frederick V did not receive his imperial investiture until 1627, and then only under severe conditions. The people suffered unspeakably during this period. In 1648, the plague broke out in Durlach and further decimated the population. The Protestant Frederick V was deposed by Emperor Ferdinand II during the Thirty Years' War. Ferdinand II enfeoffed Baden-Durlach to the Catholic Margrave of Baden-Baden instead. Frederick then retired from politics until the end of the war.

Frederick V married Duchess Barbara of Württemberg on 21 December 1616. His wife died on 8 May 1627 after nine years of marriage at the age of 33 years. Without observing the obligatory year of mourning, Frederick married Eleonore of Solms-Laubach on 8 October 1627. His second wife died on 6 July 1633. After a very brief period of mourning, he married his third wife, Mary Elizabeth on 21 January 1634; she died on 19 February 1643. On 13 February 1644, Frederick V married Anna Maria of Geroldseck, the widow of Count Frederick of Solms-Laubach. Anna Maria died on 25 May 1649 and the following year, on 20 May 1650, Frederick married his fifth and final wife, Elizabeth Eusebia of Fürstenberg.

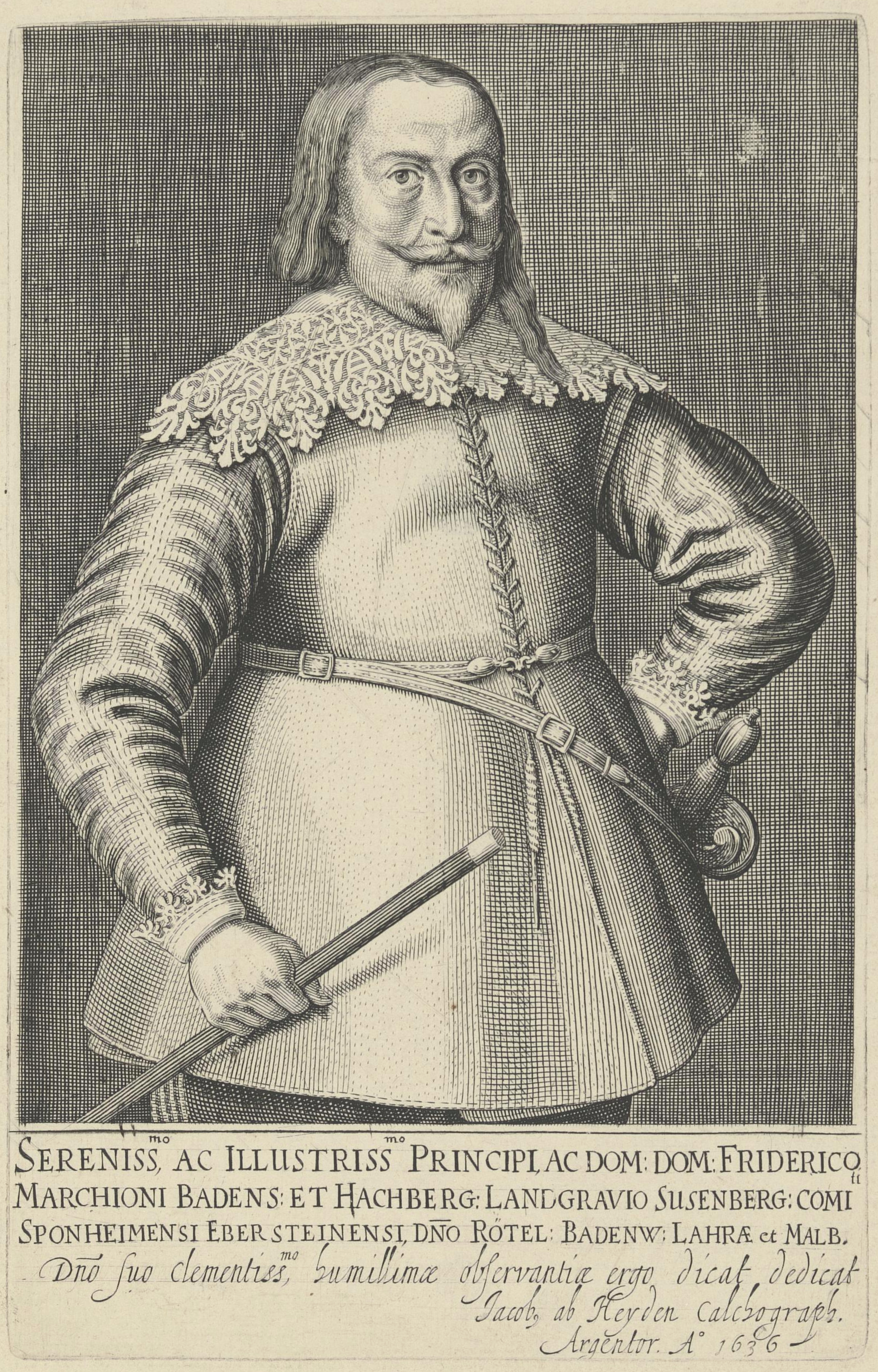
Frederick V of Baden-Durlach - engraving by Jacob van der Heyden, 1636

In 1632 Prince Louis I of Anhalt-Köthen made Frederick V a member of his Fruitbearing Society. The Society gave Frederick the nickname der Verwandte ("the Kinsman") and the motto the grape and as his emblem the common grape hyacinth (Hyacinthus botryoides L.). In the Society Book in Köthen, Frederick can be found as entry number 207.

To evade the Edict of Restitution, Frederick V joined King Gustav II Adolf of Sweden and he renewed his alliance with Sweden and France in 1635 after the Battle of Nördlingen. Consequently, Frederick V was excluded from the amnesty granted by the Diet in 1640.

At the peace negotiations in Münster that led to the Peace of Westphalia, Frederick was represented by his councillor, Amtmann John George of Merckelbach from Badenweiler. Baden-Durlach was returned to Frederick V, but not Upper Baden. He returned to Durlach in 1650 and devoted himself to his studies. In 1654, he promulgated a new civil code, which his father had created in 1622.

Frederick V died on 8 September 1659 at the age of 65 years at the Karlsburg Castle in Durlach.

== Marriages and issue ==
Frederick V married Barbara of Württemberg (born: 4 December 1593; died: 8 May 1627) on 21 December 1616. She was the daughter of the Duke Frederick I of Württemberg and his wife Princess Sibylla of Anhalt. They had following children:

- Frederick VI (born: 16 November 1617; died: 31 January 1677), Imperial Commander and Margrave of Baden-Durlach (1617–1677)
- Sibylle (born: 4 November 1618; died: 7 July 1623)
- Charles Magnus (born: 27 March 1621; died: 29 November 1658)
- Barbara (born: 6 June 1622; died: 13 September 1639)
- Johanna (born: 5 December 1623; died: 2 January 1661), married:

firstly, on 26 September 1640 the Swedish Commander-in-Chief Johan Banér (born: 3 July 1596; died: 20 May 1641)
secondly, in 1648 to Count Heinrich von Thurn und Valsássina (died: 19 August 1656)

- Friederike (April 6, 1625; † June 16, 1645)
- Christine (born: 25 December 1626, died: 11 July 1627)

On 8 October 1627, Frederick V married his second wife, Countess Eleonore of Solms-Laubach (born: 9 September 1605; died: 6 July 1633), the daughter of Count Albert Otto Albrecht I of Solms-Laubach (1576-1610) and his wife, Landgravine Anna von Hesse-Darmstadt (1583-1631). They had following children:

- Anna Philippine (born: 9 September 1629; died: 27 December 1629)
- Eleanor (died: 15 November 1630)
- Bernhard Gustav (born: 24 December 1631; died: 26 December 1677), Major General in the Swedish army; later converted to Catholicism in 1665; from 1668 he was prince-abbot at Kempten; from 1671 also abbot of the Fulda monastery; from 1672 Cardinal of Santa Susanna

On 21 January 1634, Frederick V married Countess Maria Elisabeth of Waldeck-Eisenberg (born: 2 September 1608; died: 19 February 1643), the daughter of Count Wolrad IV, Count of Waldeck-Eisenberg and his wife, Margravine Anna von Baden-Hachberg (1587-1649). This and all his subsequent marriages were childless.

On 13 February 1644, Frederick V married his fourth wife, Baroness Anna Maria von Geroldseck und Sultz (born: 28 October 1593; died: 25 May 1649), the widow of the Count Frederick of Solms-Rödelheim and daughter of Baron Jacob Geroldseck und Sultz auf Hohengeroldseck (1565-1634) and his first wife, Baroness Barbara von Rappoltstein (1566-1621).

On 20 May 1650 Frederick V married his fifth and final wife, Countess Eusebia Elisabeth of Fürstenberg (died: 8 June 1676), the daughter of Count Christopher II of Fürstenberg (1580-1614) his wife, Countess Dorothea von Sternberg (1570-1633).

== Ancestors ==
Ancestors of Frederick V of Baden-Durlach

8. Ernest, Margrave of Baden-Durlach
4. Charles II, Margrave of Baden-Durlach
9. Ursula of Rosenfeld
2. George Frederick, Margrave of Baden-Durlach
10. Rupert, Count Palatine of Veldenz
5. Anna of Veldenz
11. Ursula of Salm-Kyrburg
1. Frederick V, Margrave of Baden-Durlach
12. Philip Francis of Dhaun-Neufville-Salm
6. Frederick I of Salm-Neufville
13. Maria Aegyptiaca of Oettingen-Oettingen
3. Juliana Ursula of Salm-Neufville
14. John VII of Salm-Badenweiler
7. Francisca of Salm-Ardennes
15. Louise of Stainville

Frederick V of Baden-Durlach House of Zähringen Born: 6 July 1594 Died: 8 September 1659
Preceded by George Frederick	Margrave of Baden-Durlach; 1622–1659	Succeeded by Frederick VI
