= John William III =

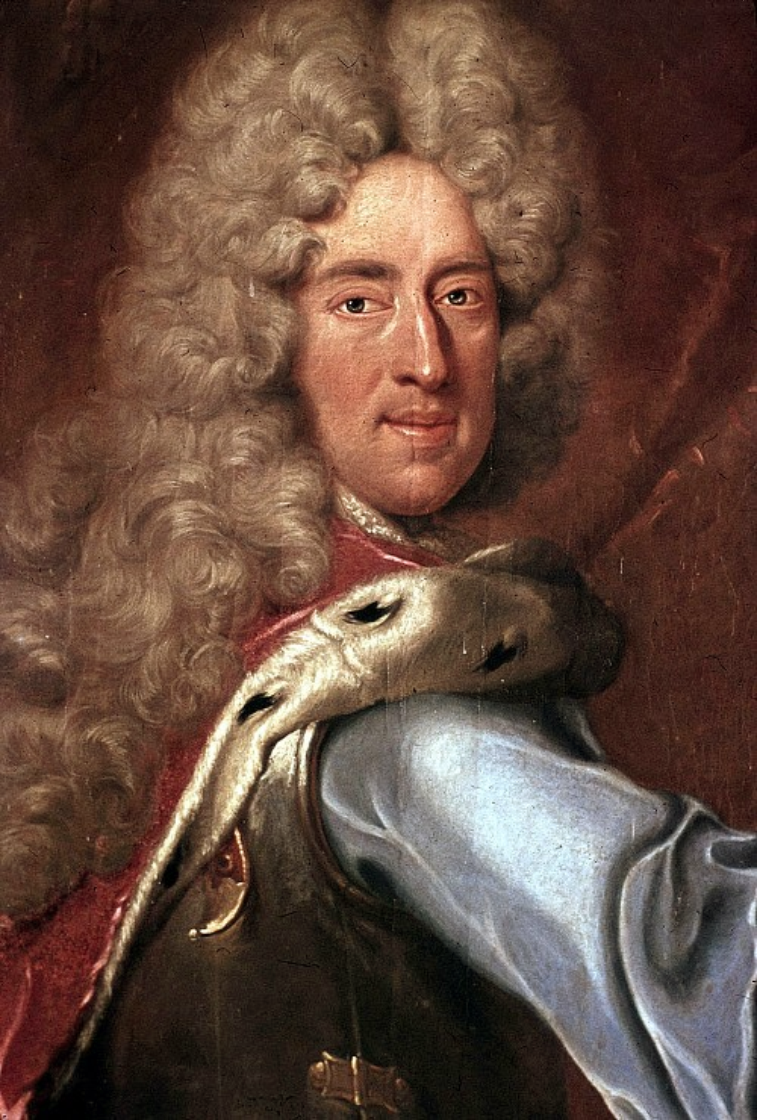
- John William in 1703

Duke of Saxe-Eisenach
- Reign: 1698–1729
- Predecessor: John George II
- Successor: Wilhelm Heinrich
- Born: 17 October 1666; Friedewald
- Died: 14 January 1729 (aged 62); Eisenach
- Spouse: Amalie of Nassau-Dietz (m. 1690; died 1695) Christine Juliane of Baden-Durlach (m. 1697; died 1707) Magdalene Sibylle of Saxe-Weissenfels (m. 1708; died 1726) Marie Christine Felizitas of Leiningen-Dagsburg-Falkenburg-Heidesheim (m. 1727)
- Issue: Wilhelm Heinrich; Johannette, Duchess of Saxe-Weissenfels; Karoline, Landgravine of Hesse-Philippsthal; Princess Charlotte Wilhelmine; Christiane, Princess of Nassau-Usingen
- House: House of Wettin
- Father: John George I, Duke of Saxe-Eisenach
- Mother: Johannetta of Sayn-Wittgenstein
- Religion: Lutheranism

John William III, Duke of Saxe-Eisenach (17 October 1666 – 14 January 1729), was a duke of Saxe-Eisenach, and came from the Ernestine line of the House of Wettin.

== Life ==
John William III was born in Friedewald, the third son of John George I, Duke of Saxe-Eisenach and Johannetta of Sayn-Wittgenstein. His twin brother, Maximilian, died at the age of two.

He succeeded his brother John George II as duke of Saxe-Eisenach when he died childless in 1698. John William III was crowned duke of Saxe-Eisenach.

Saxe-Eisenach experienced a cultural boon under his reign, which was in no small part due to the duke's court band, whose most prominent member was Georg Philipp Telemann.

== Family ==
In the Palace of Oranjewoud at Oranjewoud on 28 November 1690, John William married with Amalie (The Hague, 25 November 1655 – Allstedt, 16 February 1695), a daughter of William Frederick, Prince of Nassau-Dietz. They had two children:

1. Wilhelm Heinrich, Duke of Saxe-Eisenach (b. Oranjewoud, 10 November 1691 – d. Eisenach, 26 July 1741).
2. Albertine Johannetta (b. Oranjewoud, 28 February 1693 – d. Eisenach, 1 April 1700).

In Wolfenbüttel on 27 February 1697 — two years of the death of his first wife — John William married secondly with Christine Juliane of Baden-Durlach, a daughter of Charles Gustav of Baden-Durlach. They had seven children:

1. Johannette Antoinette Juliane (b. Jena, 31 January 1698 – d. Schloss Dahme, 13 April 1726), married on 9 May 1721 to Duke Johann Adolf II of Saxe-Weissenfels.
2. Karoline Christine (b. Jena, 15 April 1699 – d. Philippsthal, 25 July 1743), married on 24 November 1725 to Landgrave Charles I of Hesse-Philippsthal.
3. Anton Gustav (b. Eisenach, 12 August 1700 – d. Eisenach, 4 October 1710).
4. Charlotte Wilhelmine Juliane (b. Eisenach, 27 June 1703 – d. Erfurt, 17 August 1774).
5. Johannetta Wilhelmine Juliane (b. Eisenach, 10 September 1704 – d. Eisenach, 3 January 1705).
6. Karl Wilhelm (b. Eisenach, 9 January 1706 – d. Eisenach, 24 February 1706).
7. Karl August (b. Eisenach, 10 June 1707 – d. Eisenach, 22 February 1711).

In Weissenfels on 28 July 1708 — one year after the death of his second wife — John William married thirdly with Magdalene Sibylle of Saxe-Weissenfels, a daughter of Johann Adolf I, Duke of Saxe-Weissenfels. They had three children:

1. Johanna Magdalene Sophie (b. Eisenach, 19 August 1710 – d. Eisenach, 26 February 1711).
2. Christiane Wilhelmine (b. Altenkirchen, 3 September 1711 – d. Idstein, 27 November 1740), married on 26 November 1734 to Prince Charles of Nassau-Usingen.
3. Johann Wilhelm (b. Marksuhl, 28 January 1713 – d. Eisenach, 8 May 1713).

In the Schloss Philippsruhe on 29 May 1727 — one year after the death of his third wife — John William married fourthly with Marie Christine Felizitas of Leiningen-Dagsburg-Falkenburg-Heidesheim, Dowager Princess of Baden-Durlach. This union was childless. John William died at Eisenach.

John William III House of Wettin Born: 17 October 1666 Died: 14 January 1729
Preceded by Johann Georg II	Duke of Saxe-Eisenach; 1698–1729	Succeeded by Wilhelm Heinrich
