= Sophie Charlotte of Württemberg =

Duchess consort of Saxe-Eisenach
- Tenure: 1688–1698
- Born: 22 February 1671; Stuttgart
- Died: 11 September 1717 (aged 46); Allstedt
- Spouse: John George II, Duke of Saxe-Eisenach
- House: Württemberg
- Father: Eberhard III, Duke of Württemberg
- Mother: Marie Dorothea Sophie of Oettingen-Oettingen

Sophie Charlotte of Württemberg (22 February 1671 – 11 September 1717), was a German noblewoman of the House of Württemberg and by marriage Duchess of Saxe-Eisenach.

== Early life and ancestry ==
Born in Stuttgart, she was the ninth of eleven children of Eberhard III, Duke of Württemberg and his second wife, Countess Marie Dorothea Sophie of Oettingen-Oettingen. From Sophie Charlotte's ten full-siblings, only she and his three (unmarried) brothers George Frederick, Louis and John Frederick survive adulthood; in addition, they had fourteen older half-siblings from their father's first marriage with Anna Katharina, Wild- and Rheingräfin of Salm-Kyrburg, of whom only eight survived: Sophie Louise (by marriage Margravine of Brandenburg-Bayreuth), Christine Fredericka (by marriage Duchess of Oettingen-Oettingen), Christine Charlotte (by marriage Princess of Ostfriesland), William Louis, Duke of Württemberg, Anna Katharine (unmarried), Eberhardine Katharine (by marriage Duchess of Oettingen-Oettingen), Frederick Charles, Duke of Württemberg-Winnental and Karl Maximilian (unmarried).

== Biography ==
In Kirchheim unter Teck on 20 September 1688, Sophie Charlotte married John George II, Duke of Saxe-Eisenach. They had no children.

Duke John George II died of smallpox on 10 November 1698. Sophie Charlotte never remarried and survived him eighteen years. She died in Allstedt aged 46 and was buried in the Georgenkirche, Eisenach.

== Notes ==
Sophie Charlotte of Württemberg House of Württemberg Born: 22 February 1671 Died: 11 September 1717
German royalty
Vacant Title last held by Johannetta of Sayn-Wittgenstein	Duchess consort of Saxe-Eisenach; 1688-1698	Succeeded by Christine Juliane of Baden-Durlach
