= Jacob van der Heyden =

Flemish Baroque painter, sculptor and engraver

Jacob van der Heyden (1572–1636) was a Flemish Baroque painter, sculptor and engraver.

According to Houbraken he was a painter from Strasbourg who painted for royalty.

According to the RKD he was a son of Jan van der Heyden (died 1610) and worked in Strasbourg and was known for portraits, landscapes and historical allegories. Most of his work that survives today are engravings. He died in Strasbourg or Cologne.

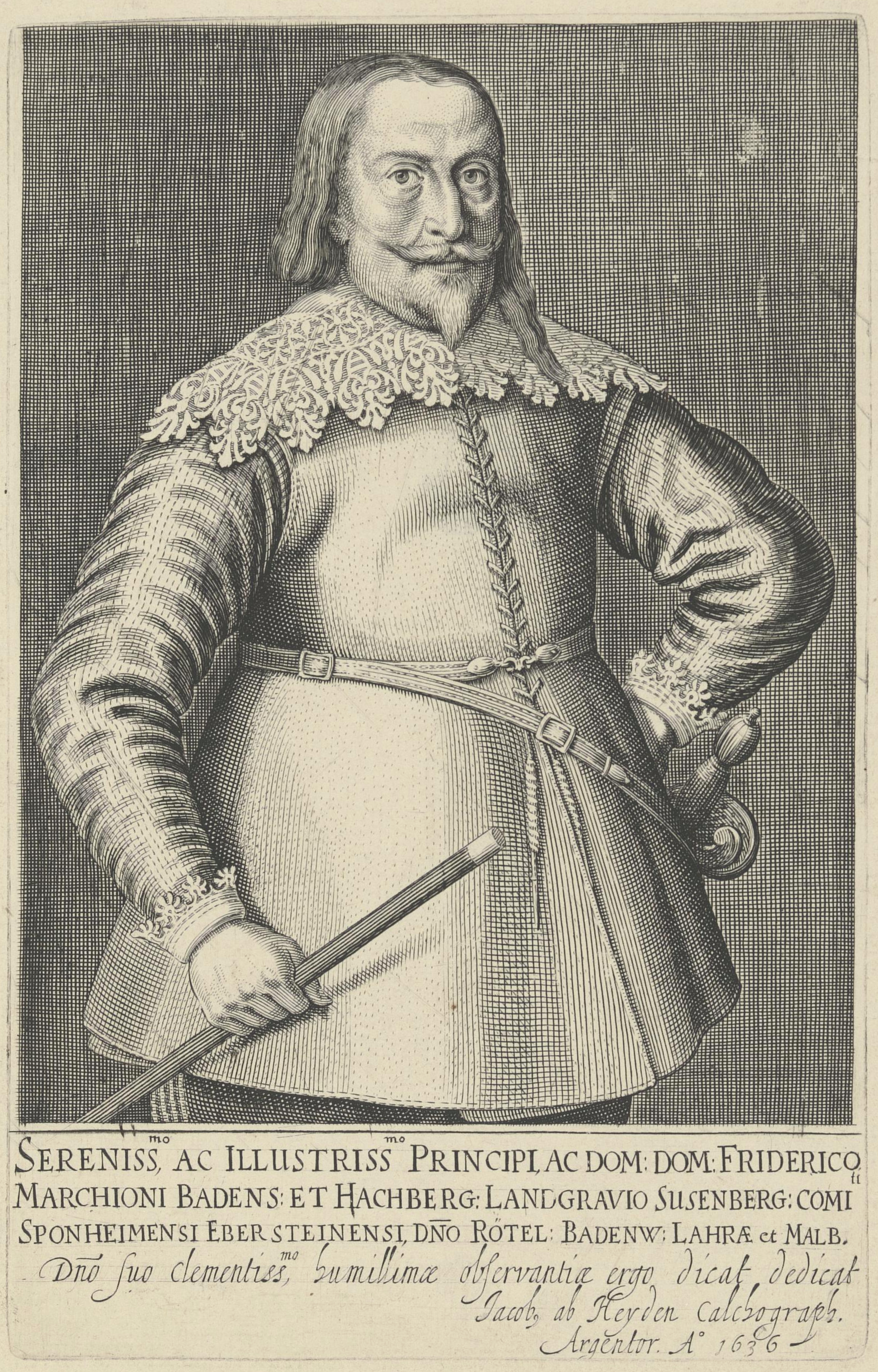
Portrait of Frederick V, Margrave of Baden-Durlach
