= Akagi =

Akagi means (赤城) "red castle," (赤木) "red tree," or (赤来) "red future" in the Japanese language, and may refer to:

- Akagi, Gunma, a village in Gunma Prefecture
- Akagi, Shimane (赤来町), a former town in Shimane Prefecture
- Akagi (manga), a manga by Nobuyuki Fukumoto
- Akagi (surname), a Japanese surname
- Akagi (train), a train service in Japan
- "Akagi", a song performed by Maximum the Hormone
- One of two ships of the Imperial Japanese Navy:
  - Japanese gunboat Akagi, which served in the Sino-Japanese War
  - Japanese aircraft carrier Akagi, which served in World War II
- Mount Akagi, a mountain in the Kantō region of Japan
