= Akagi (surname) =

Akagi (written: 赤城 lit. "red castle" or 赤木 lit. "red tree") is a Japanese surname. Notable people with the surname include:

- Chieko Akagi (赤城 千恵子, born 1966), Japanese sprint canoeist
- Kei Akagi (赤城 恵, born 1953), Japanese-American jazz pianist
- Keiichirō Akagi (赤木 圭一郎, 1939–1961), Japanese actor
- Norihiko Akagi (赤城 徳彦, born 1959), Japanese politician
- Susumu Akagi (赤城 進, born 1972), Japanese voice actor
- Hirofumi Akagi, Japanese electrical engineer, professor

== Fictional characters ==
- Dr. Ritsuko Akagi (赤木 リツコ), character from the anime television series Neon Genesis Evangelion
- Takenori Akagi (赤木 剛憲) and Haruko Akagi (赤木 晴子), two sibling characters from the basketball manga and anime Slam Dunk
- Daidoji Akagi, character and card personality in the L5R games and setting
- Ippei Akagi (赤城 一平), character from Denshi Sentai Denjiman
- Nobuo Akagi (赤木 信夫), character from Unofficial Sentai Akibaranger
- Ryan Akagi, character from Infinity Train
- Shigeru Akagi (赤木しげる), the main character from the manga Akagi (manga)
