= Kellereischloss =

Schloss in Bavaria, Germany

Coordinates: 50°06′52″N 9°53′22″E

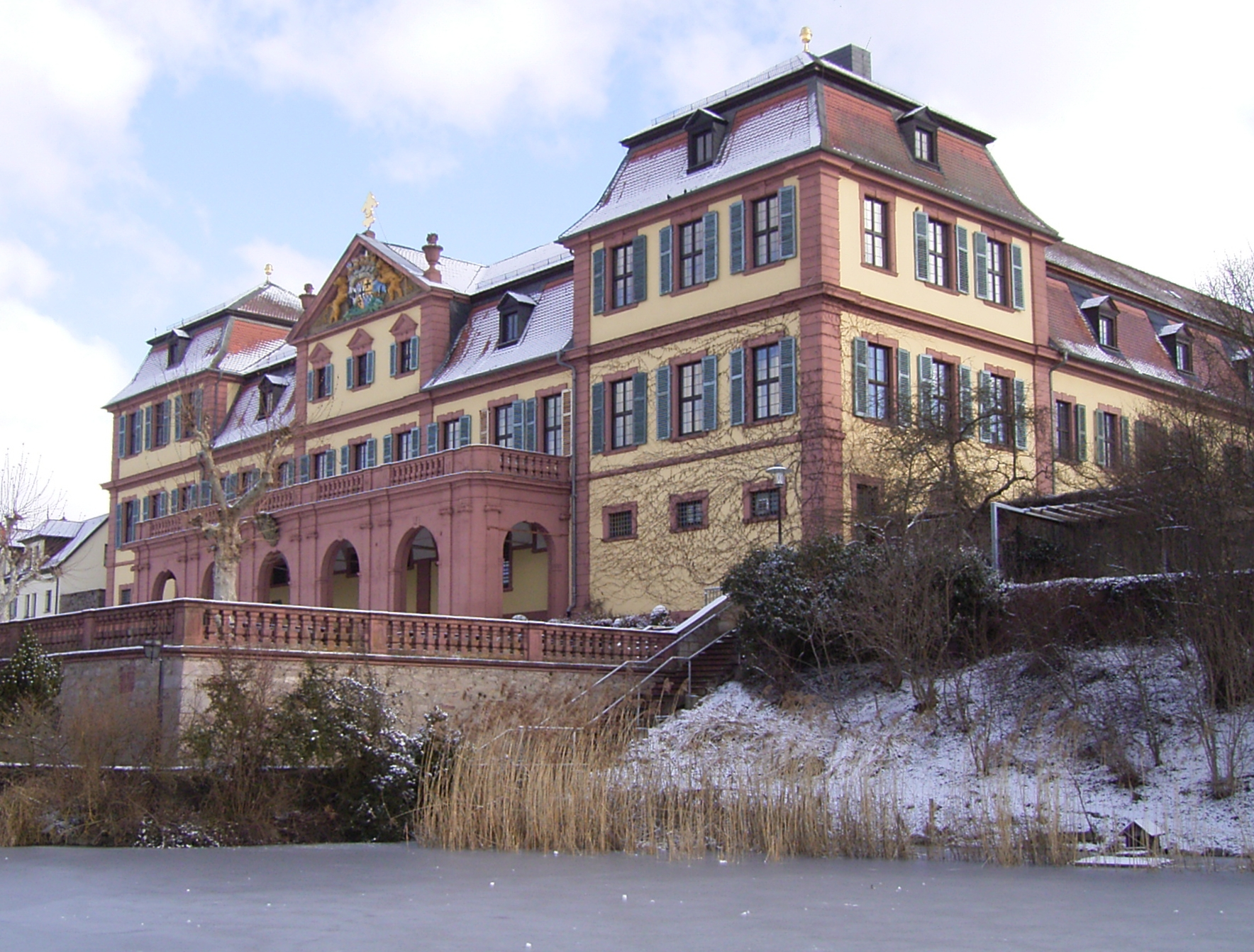
Kellereischloss

Kellereischloss is a Schloss in Hammelburg, Lower Franconia, Bavaria, Germany. It is in the Baroque architectural style.

'Kellereischloss' might be translated into English as 'Wine Cellar Castle'. The building is colloquially known as Rotes Schloss ('Red Castle').

Kellereischloss was designed and built between 1726 and 1731 by Andrea Gallasini (1681-1766), architect to the court of Adolphus von Dalberg, Prince-Abbot of Fulda. The site had been a wine cellar, and the seat of a tax collector, since 1279. The Prince-Abbot now desired a summer residence. It seems to have been to his satisfaction; for, in 1737, he died there.

The giant cellars under Kellereischloss could, at the high point of wine production in Hammelburg at the end of the 18th century, store 101 wine barrels with a total capacity of more than 700,000 litres (150,000 imp gal; 180,000 US gal).
