= Wilhelm Heinrich von Sachsen-Eisenach =

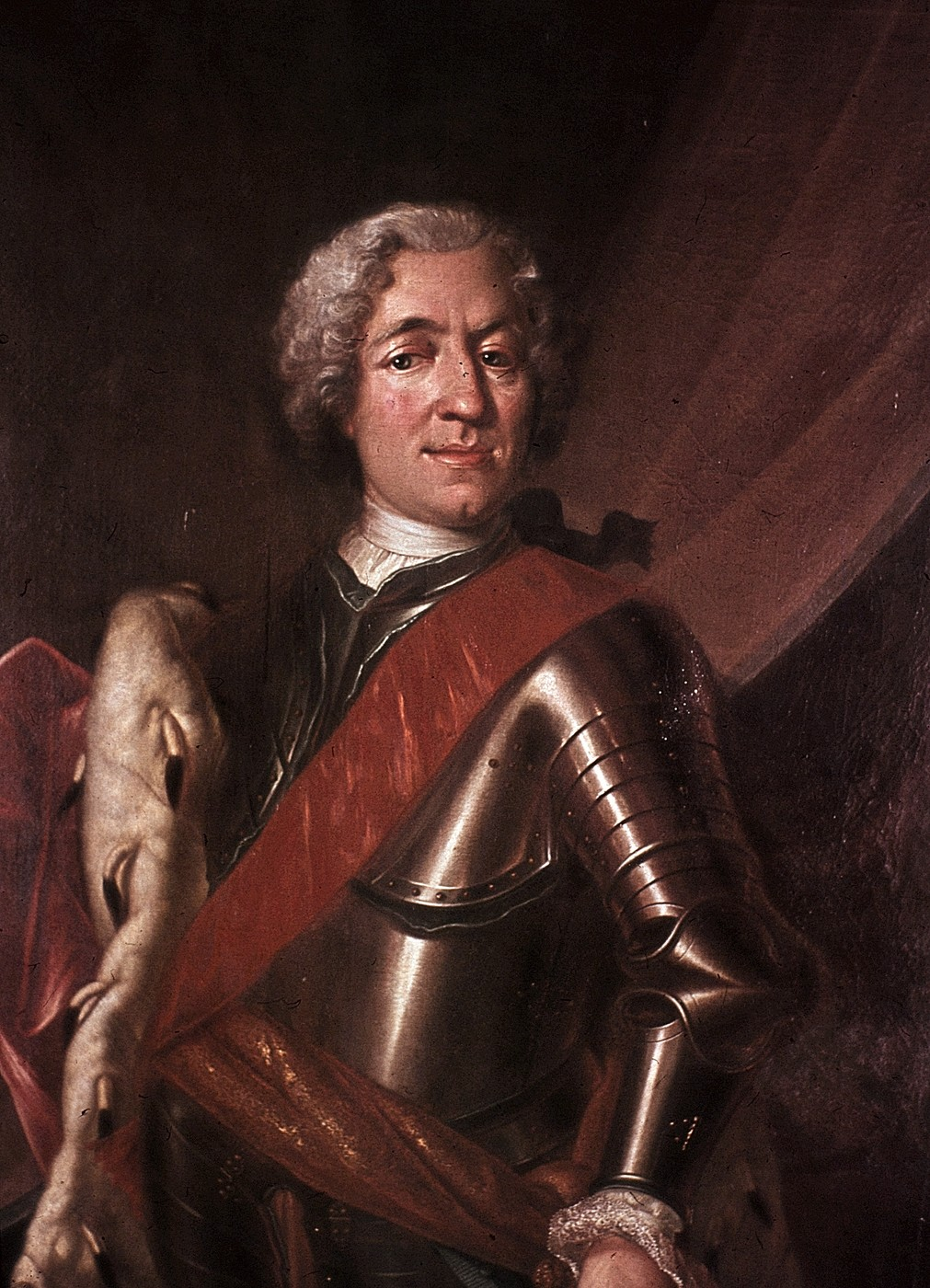
- Portrait of Wilhelm Heinrich, c. 1710–1735

Duke of Saxe-Eisenach
- Reign: 1729–1741
- Predecessor: Johann Wilhelm
- Successor: Ernst August I
- Born: 10 November 1691; Palace of Oranjewoud at Oranjewoud
- Died: 26 July 1741 (aged 49); Eisenach
- Spouse: Albertine Juliane of Nassau-Idstein (m. 1713; died 1722) Anna Sophie Charlotte of Brandenburg-Schwedt (m. 1723)
- House: House of Wettin
- Father: Johann Wilhelm, Duke of Saxe-Eisenach
- Mother: Amalie of Nassau-Dietz
- Religion: Lutheranism

Wilhelm Heinrich von Sachsen-Eisenach (10 November 1691 – 26 July 1741), was a duke of Saxe-Eisenach.

He was born in Oranjewoud, the eldest and only surviving son of Johann Wilhelm, Duke of Saxe-Eisenach and his first wife Amalie of Nassau-Dietz.

Wilhelm Heinrich first married Albertine Juliane of Nassau-Idstein (daughter George August, Count of Nassau-Idstein) in Idstein on 15 February 1713. This marriage was childless. He married his second wife Anna Sophie Charlotte of Brandenburg-Schwedt in Berlin on 3 June 1723, just eight months after the death of Albertine Juliane. The second marriage was also childless.

From 1730 to 1741, Johann Adam Birkenstock served the director of music and the leader of the court orchestra, a position referred to as the Kapellmeister. However the court Kapelle (chapel choir) was disbanded after Wilhelm Heinrich's death in 1741.

Wilhelm Heinrich acceded to the duchy of Saxe-Eisenach in 1729 upon the death of his father and was succeeded by his second cousin, duke Ernst August I of Saxe-Weimar. The personal union between Eisenach and Weimar created by this succession was only nominal until 1809, when the two patrimonies were formally united. He died in Eisenach.

== Life ==
As an 18-year-old, he barely survived a fall from a horse, but sustained a severe kidney injury that would plague him for the rest of his life. In 1729, after the death of his father, he ascended the ducal throne of Saxe-Eisenach.

As early as 1723, through his marriage to a Prussian princess, knight of the Order of the Black Eagle, he showed great interest in everything military. He gave two of his Eisenach regiments into foreign service, for example in the Netherlands and in the Imperial Army. On October 17, 1740, he also promised his nephew by marriage, the Prussian king Friedrich II., another regiment, the later Füsilierregiment No. 40. That already in 1732 The regiment, which was set up with two musketeer battalions, had already fought in the War of Succession to the Polish throne, in imperial service on the Rhine, in northern Italy and on Lake Constance, since 1734 with three battalions. After the Vienna Peace and the return to Eisenach in 1739, it was reduced to a battalion; most officers retired. Sworn to Prussia on October 8, 1739, it was taken over in Magdeburg in 1740 by Colonel Christian Reinhold von Derschau. The duke enlisted 25 non-Eisenachian officers, procured replacements for the second battalion, and became chief of the regiment.

He was buried in the Georgenkirche in Eisenach. With his death, the family of the dukes of Saxe-Eisenach died out, and the principality became an inheritance to Saxe-Weimar. Since then, the two countries were united and known as the Duchy, from 1815 Grand Duchy Saxe-Weimar-Eisenach.

== Marriages ==
Wilhelm Heinrich was married twice. In his first marriage he married Albertine Juliane of Nassau-Idstein in 1713. In his second marriage he married Anna Sophie Charlotte of Brandenburg-Schwedt in 1723. Both marriages remained childless.

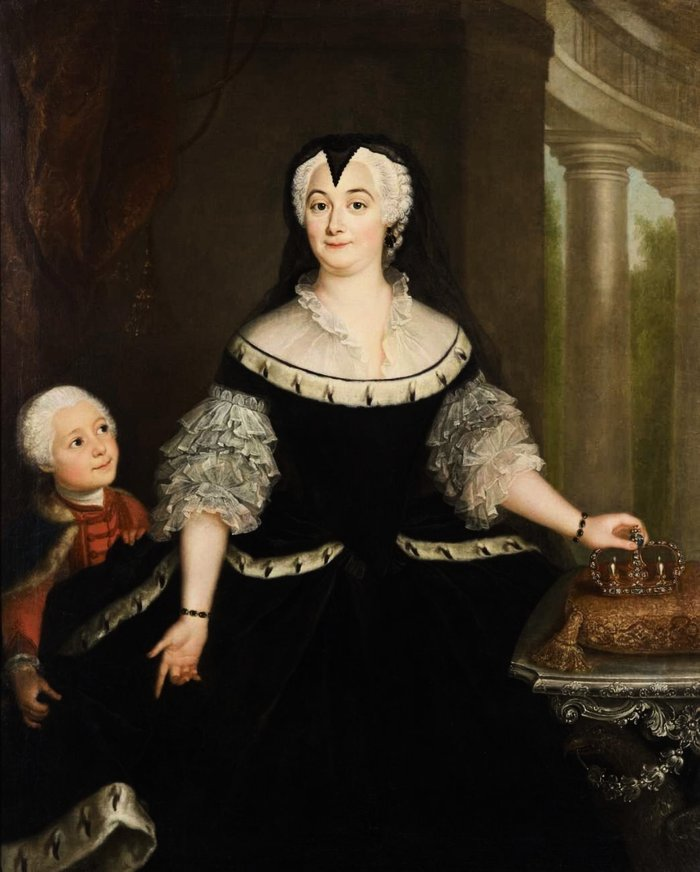
Anna Sophie Charlotte of Brandenburg-Schwedt; Portrait by Anna Rosina de Gasc

Anna Sophie Charlotte of Brandenburg-Schwedt (24 December 1706 – 3 January 1751), was a German noblewoman and member of the House of Hohenzollern and by marriage Duchess of Saxe-Eisenach.

Born in Berlin, she was the third of seven children born from the marriage of Margrave Albert Frederick of Brandenburg-Schwedt (a younger brother of King Frederick I of Prussia) and Maria Dorothea Kettler, by birth Princess of Courland and Semigallia. From Anna Sophie's six other siblings, one sister (Sophie Fredericka Albertine, by marriage Princess of Anhalt-Bernburg), survived to adulthood and had offspring.

In Berlin on 3 June 1723 Anna Sophie married Wilhelm Heinrich, Hereditary Prince of Saxe-Eisenach as his second wife. They had no children. She became in Duchess consort of Saxe-Eisenach after the accession of her husband on 14 January 1729.

Anna Sophie died in Sangerhausen aged 44, having survived her husband by nine years. She was buried in Halle.

== Literature ==
- Siegrid Westphal: A prince is looking for his fortune – the class lottery under Wilhelm Heinrich von Saxechsen-Eisenach (1691–1741) . In: Annette C. Cremer, Alexander Jendorff (eds.): Decorum and mammon in conflict? Aristocratic economic activity between class profiles, striving for profit and economic necessity (interdisciplinary courtly culture - writings and materials of the Rudolstadt working group on residence culture, vol. 4), Heidelberg University Publishing: Heidelberg 2022, ISBN 978-3-96822-069-7, p. 365-378.

Preceded by Johann Wilhelm	Duke of Saxe-Eisenach; 1729–1741	Succeeded by Ernst August I
