= Magdalena Sibylla of Saxe-Weissenfels (1673–1726) =

Magdalene Sibylle of Saxe-Weissenfels
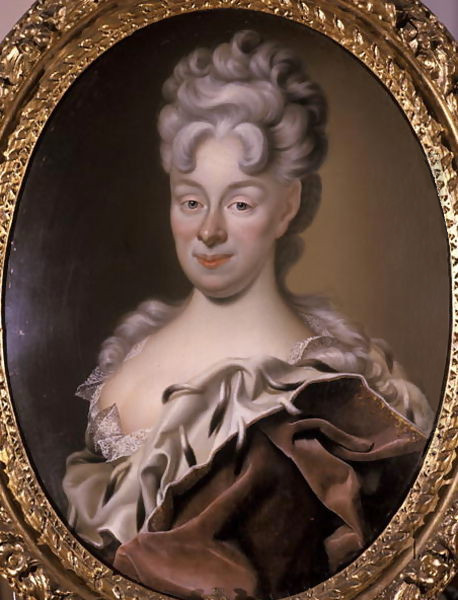
- 1708 portrait

Duchess consort of Saxe-Eisenach
- Tenure: 28 July 1708 – 28 November 1726
- Born: 3 September 1673; Halle
- Died: 28 November 1726 (aged 53); Eisenach
- Spouse: John William III, Duke of Saxe-Eisenach
- Issue: Christiane Wilhelmine, Princess of Nassau-Usingen
- House: House of Wettin
- Father: Johann Adolf I, Duke of Saxe-Weissenfels
- Mother: Johanna Magdalena of Saxe-Altenburg

Magdalene Sibylle of Saxe-Weissenfels (3 September 1673 – 28 November 1726), was a German noblewoman member of the House of Wettin (Albertine line) and by marriage Duchess of Saxe-Eisenach.

== Life ==
Born in Halle, she was the oldest daughter and first child of Duke Johann Adolf I of Saxe-Weissenfels and his wife Johanna Magdalena, the daughter of Duke Frederick William II of Saxe-Altenburg. She was named after her paternal great-grandmother, Duchess Magdalene Sibylle of Prussia.

In Weissenfels on 28 July 1708, Magdalene Sibylle married John William III, Duke of Saxe-Eisenach as his third wife. They had three children, of whom only one survived to adulthood:

1. Johanna Magdalene Sophie (Eisenach, 19 August 1710 - Eisenach, 26 February 1711).
2. Christiane Wilhelmine (Altenkirchen, 3 September 1711 - Idstein, 27 November 1740), married on 26 November 1734 to Charles, Prince of Nassau-Usingen.
3. John William (Marksuhl, 28 January 1713 - Eisenach, 8 May 1713).

She died in Eisenach aged 53 and was buried in the Georgenkirche, Eisenach.

== Notes ==
Magdalena Sibylla of Saxe-Weissenfels (1673–1726) House of Wettin Born: 3 September 1673 Died: 28 November 1726
German royalty
Vacant Title last held by Christine Juliane of Baden-Durlach	Duchess consort of Saxe-Eisenach; 1708–1726	Vacant Title next held by Marie Christine Felizitas of Leiningen-Dagsburg-Falkenburg-Heidesheim
