= Frederick VI of Baden-Durlach =

Margrave of Baden-Durlach (1617–1677)

Frederick VI, Margrave of Baden-Durlach
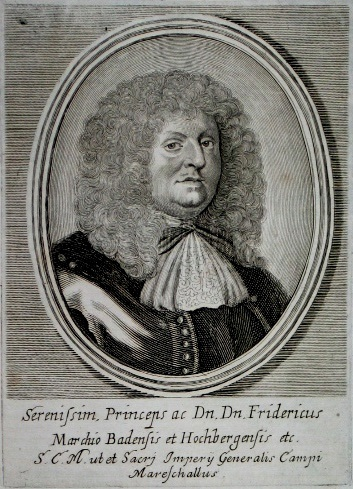
- Frederick VI, Margrave of Baden-Durlach
- Born: 16 November 1617; Karlsburg Castle in Durlach
- Died: 31 January 1677 (aged 59); Karlsburg Castle in Durlach
- Spouse: Christina Magdalena of the Palatinate-Zweibrücken (m. 1642; died 1662): Johanna Bayer of Sendau
- Issue Detail: Christine; Frederick VII, Margrave of Baden-Durlach; Charles Gustav
- House: House of Zähringen
- Father: Friedrich V, Margrave of Baden-Durlach
- Mother: Barbara of Württemberg

Frederick VI, Margrave of Baden-Durlach (16 November 1617 – 10 or 31 January 1677) was the Margrave of Baden-Durlach from 1659 until his death.

== Life ==
He was born at Karlsburg Castle, in Durlach (now part of Karlsruhe) as the son of Friedrich V, Margrave of Baden-Durlach and Barbara of Württemberg. He studied in Strasbourg and Paris where he particularly enjoyed the science of war. Later he participated in the defense of German territories against the Ottoman invasion of 1663. Frederick later also participated in the Franco-Dutch War.

After the end of the Thirty Years' War in 1648 he did not take time out to recover from his war crafts. As early as 1663, the Turks had penetrated deep into Hungary. The imperial army of Emperor Leopold I began to organize a common defense against the Turks and demanded that Baden-Durlach should also provide troops. Frederick VI participated in this war as a Major General.

The Emperor granted, even before the war began, to Frederick and his cousin, Margrave William of Baden-Baden, the right to use the style Serene Highness. This title was hereditary until 1803, when Margrave Charles Frederick of the in 1771 re-united margraviate of Baden was raised to Elector after he had greatly expanded his territory during the German Mediatisation.

In the battle against the Turks, Frederick's cousin Louis William distinguished himself and earned himself the nickname Türkenlouis ("Turk Louis"). After the Turks were defeated, Frederick participated on the Dutch side in the Franco-Dutch War. In 1676, he began a siege on the fortress of Philippsburg; after he captured the city on 17 September of that year, it was added to the Baden-Durlach territories.

He died on 10 or 31 January 1677 at the Karlsburg Castle in Durlach.

== Marriages and issue ==
Frederick VI married his first wife on 30 November 1642 Christine Magdalene (born: 15 May 1616; died: 14 August 1662), the daughter of the Count Palatine John Casimir of Kleeburg. They had the following children:

- Frederick Casimir (born 27 November 1643; † March 1644)
- Christine (born April 22, 1645; † December 21, 1705), married:

firstly, on 27 July 1665, the Margrave Albert of Brandenburg-Ansbach (born: 18 September 1620; died: 22 October 1667)
secondly, on 14 August 1681 Duke Frederick I of Saxe-Gotha (born: 15 July 1646; died: 2 August 1691)

- Eleonore Catherine (born: 4 May 1646; died: 9 July 1646)
- Frederick VII Magnus (born 23 September 1647; died 25 June 1709)
- Charles Gustav (born 27 September 1648; died 24 October 1703)
- Catherine Barbara (born 4 July 1650; died 14 January 1733)
- Johanna Elisabeth (born 6 November 1651; died 28 September 1680), married on 26 January 1673 the Margrave John Frederick of Brandenburg-Ansbach
- Friederike Eleonore (born 6 March 1658; died 13 April 1658)

Frederick VI's second marriage was a morganatic one. His second wife was Johanna Bayer of Sendau, (1636–1699); her descendants are the Barons of Münzesheim.

- Frederick, (died 1678), Baron of Münzesheim
- John Bernhard (born 17 May 1669; died 1734), Baron of Münzesheim

married firstly Sophie Magdalene of Münchingen (1676–1703)
married secondly, in 1704, Juliana Sabine of Remchingen (1681–1763)

== Ancestors ==
Ancestors of Frederick VI of Baden-Durlach

8. Charles II, Margrave of Baden-Durlach
4. Georg Friedrich, Margrave of Baden-Durlach
9. Anna of Veldenz
2. Frederick V, Margrave of Baden-Durlach
10. Frederick I of Salm-Neufville
5. Juliana Ursula of Salm-Neufville
11. Francisca of Salm-Ardennes
1.Frederick VI, Margrave of Baden-Durlach
12. George I of Württemberg-Mömpelgard
6. Frederick I, Duke of Württemberg
13. Barbara of Hesse
3. Barbara of Württemberg
14. Joachim Ernest, Prince of Anhalt
7. Sibylla of Anhalt
15. Agnes of Barby-Mühlingen

== Sources ==
- (in German) Arthur Kleinschmidt: "Friedrich VI.". In: Allgemeine Deutsche Biographie (ADB). Band 7, Duncker & Humblot, Leipzig 1877, p. 461 ff.
- (in German) Arthur Kleinschmidt (1877). "Friedrich VI." . Allgemeine Deutsche Biographie (in German). Vol. 7. Leipzig: Duncker & Humblot. pp. 461–462.
- (in German) "Entry". Zedlers Universallexikon. Vol. 9. p. 1060.

== Footnotes ==
Frederick VI of Baden-Durlach House of Zähringen Born: 16 November 1617 Died: 10/31 January 1677
Preceded by Frederick V	Margrave of Baden-Durlach; 1659–1677	Succeeded by Frederick VII
