= Hammelburg =

- Town
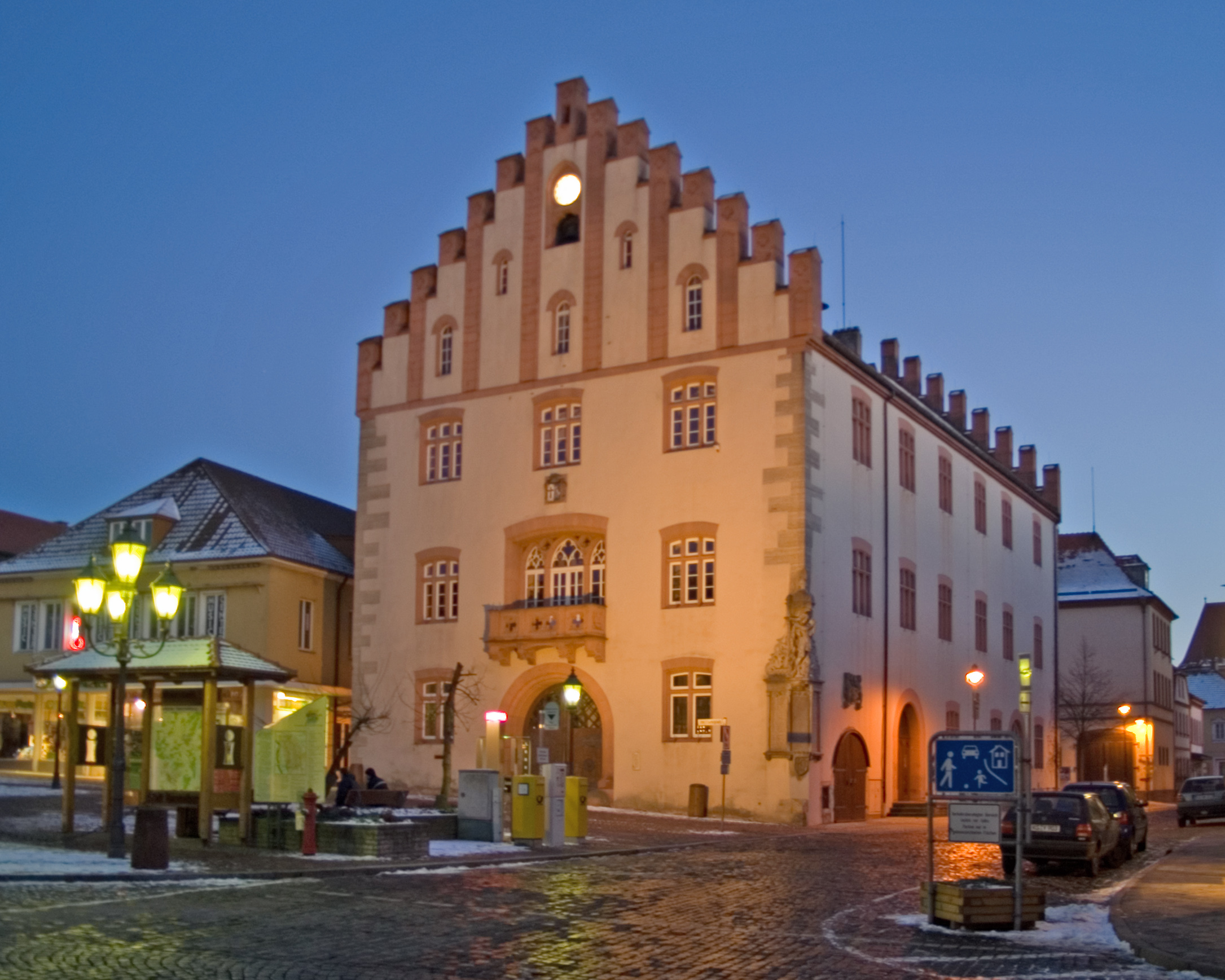
- Town hall

- Coat of arms

- Location of Hammelburg within Bad Kissingen district
- Interactive map of Hammelburg
- Location within Germany Location within Bavaria
- Coordinates: 50°07′N 9°54′E
- Country: Germany
- State: Bavaria
- Admin. region: Unterfranken
- District: Bad Kissingen
- Subdivisions: 10 Stadtteile

Government
  - Mayor (2020–26): Armin Warmuth (CSU)

Area
  - Total: 128.88 km^{2} (49.76 sq mi)
- Elevation: 182 m (597 ft)

Population (2025-12-31)
  - Total: 10,557
  - Density: 81.913/km^{2} (212.15/sq mi)
- Time zone: UTC+01:00 (CET)
  - Summer (DST): UTC+02:00 (CEST)
- Postal codes: 97762
- Dialling codes: 09732
- Vehicle registration: KG, BRK, HAB
- Website: www.hammelburg.de

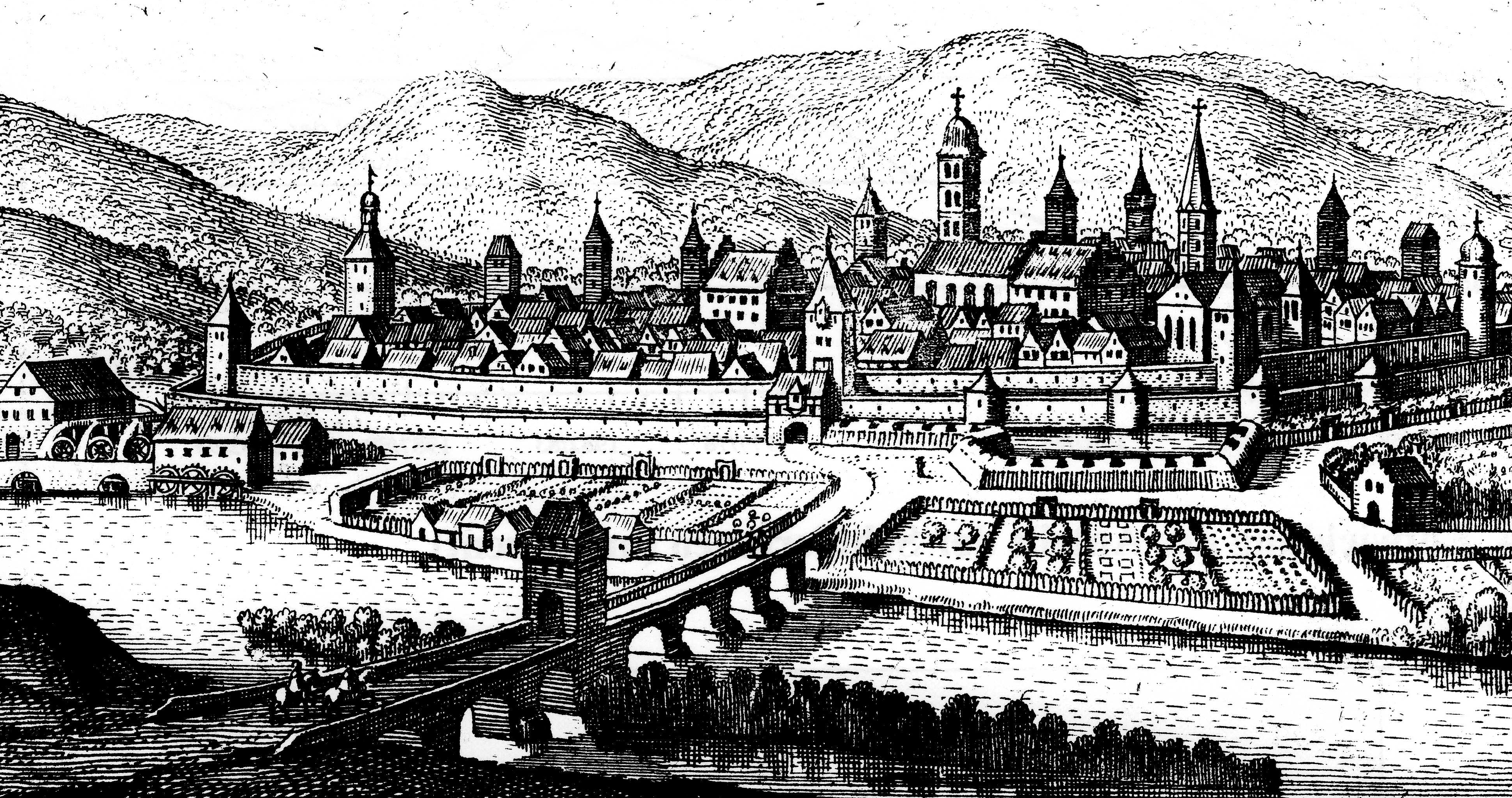
Hammelburg – engraving by Matthäus Merian 1655

Hammelburg (German pronunciation: [ˈhaml̩bʊʁk]) is a town in Bavaria, Germany. It sits in the district of Bad Kissingen, in Lower Franconia. It lies on the river Franconian Saale, 25 km west of Schweinfurt. Hammelburg is the oldest winegrowing town (Weinstadt) in Franconia.

== History ==
Hammelburg was first documented on 18 April 716 as Hamulo Castellum, when Hedan II, Duke of Thuringia, donated the place to Saint Willibrord. In 741, Carloman bequeathed Saint Martin's Church (Martinskirche) to Saint Boniface for the foundation of the Diocese of Würzburg. In 777, Charlemagne donated Hammelburg with its entire municipal area to the Abbey of Fulda. At this time, the fortress (Castellum) was in a favorable location at a ford on the Franconian Saale, and on the intersection of east–west and north–south trade routes.

In the 12th century, the prince-abbots of Fulda built the castle of Saaleck on the heights over the Saale's left bank for Hammelburg's protection, which particularly served for control of the Trimburg established by the Hennebergs. In 1234, Würzburg succeeded in appropriating the Trimburg from the Hennebergs. Fulda answered this by moving closer to the old opponent with the attachment of Hammelburg and to the stronger development of Saaleck Castle. In 1303, under King Albrecht, town privileges were granted to Hammelburg. Walls and ditches surrounded the city, specifically three gate towers (Weiher, upper, and lower) and eleven military towers. From this time the Guardian, Monk and Baderturm, a part of the southern city wall and the Schlossweiher survive. Hammelburger citizens had begun in 1302 to build a church. This Church of Maria (Marienkirche) at the cattle market became a symbol of civil self-sufficiency. The parish church Johannes in the old castle district the Hammelburger was left to the national organization. The Marienkirche fell victim to a fire in 1854 that destroyed several other parts of the city. The gothic-era parish church (1389-1461) survives. Despite the support of Fulda and Würzburg, Hammelburg converted early to the Lutheran faith and only by force did the city return to Catholicism in 1604. 120 Protestant Hammelburger families left their hometown because of it.

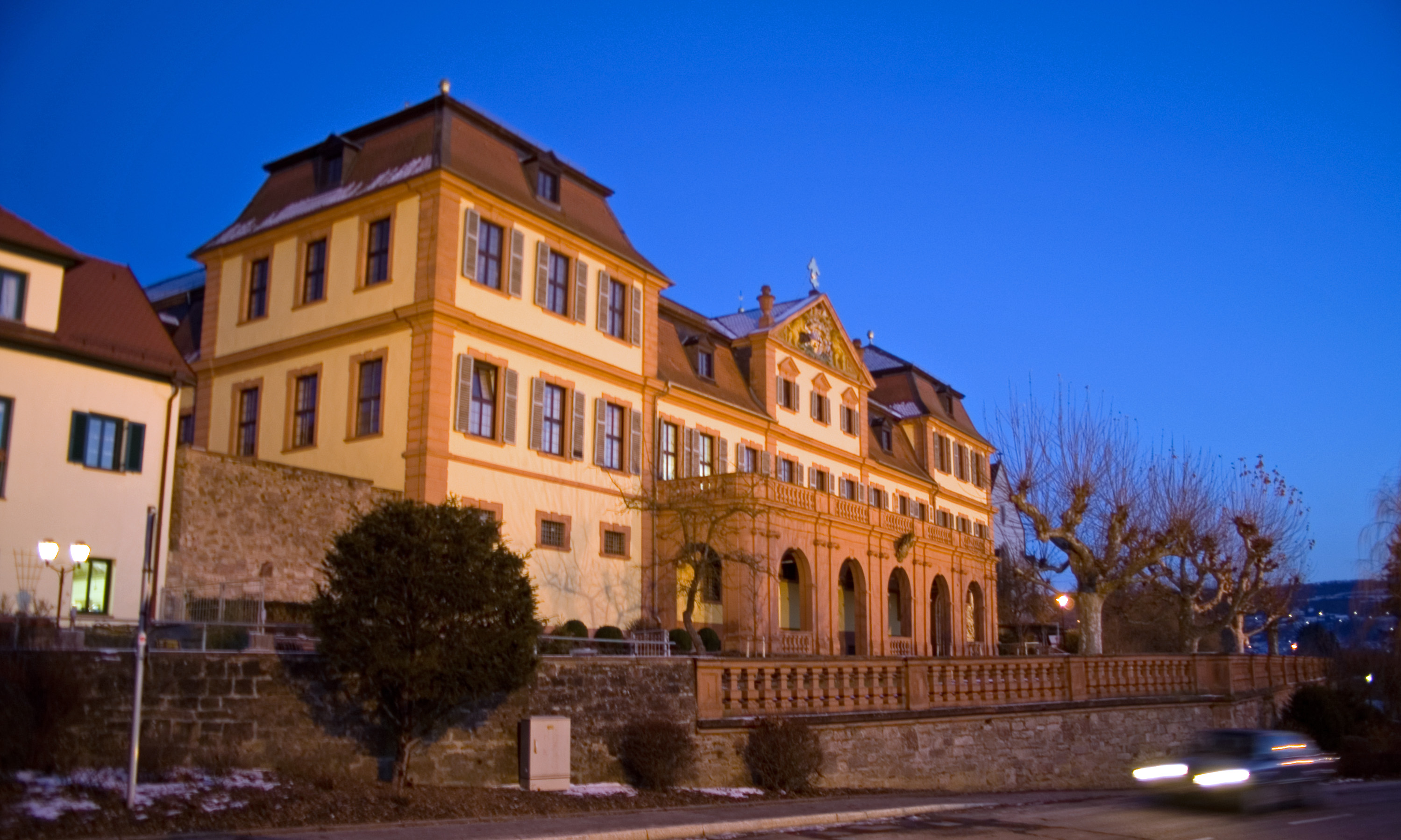
Kellereischloss

A few years later, an epidemic cost the city many citizens. The city did not recover until the 18th century. From this blooming time of the 16th century, came the (1524-1526) city hall, a new building in the Renaissance style, from architect Johannes Schöner, (1529). The first council meeting was held there. Only the lateral stair tower and the city hall cellar remain. The current city hall, built after the fire in the Gothic style, was occupied on 12 December 1859. The Renaissance market well, completed in 1541, is also the work of master builder Schöner.

Until 1803, Hammelburg belonged to Fulda. In the course of the German mediatisation it passed to the Principality of Nassau-Orange-Fulda from 1803-1806. Under Napoleon's brother-in-law, Marshal Murat (1806-1810), the city was under French administration. In 1810, it was assigned to the new Grand Duchy of Frankfurt. After a short Austrian affiliation, the city was integrated in 1816 into the Kingdom of Bavaria.

The Nazi Party placed Hammelburg in Gau Mainfranken. During World War II, Hammelburg was the site of the POW Camps OFLAG XIII-B and Stalag XIII-C, as well as the attempted rescue of POWs from these camps by Task Force Baum in 1945. Lt. Donald Prell of the 106th Infantry Division was one of the POWs liberated by the Task Force. American television sitcom Hogan's Heroes featured a fictional Stalag 13, said to be near Hammelburg — the German Wehrmacht Heer-operated Stalag XIII-C POW camp was located in Hammelburg. The German Army's Infantry School (Infanterieschule) is located there.

During the post-war years the population grew as the town attracted refugees from Eastern Europe and Eastern Germany and starting from 1956 the German Federal Armed Forces reorganization. In those years, the edge municipalities also saw a large population increase. The local reorganisation let the number of inhabitants rise in Hammelburg again. The former municipalities of Westheim, Pfaffenhausen, Untererthal, Obererthal, Feuerthal, Morlesau, and Obereschenbach. Untereschenbach and Gauaschach attached themselves to Hammelburg, which thus reached approximately 12,500 inhabitants.

== Amenities ==
The city can be reached by motorway. Architectural monuments, restaurants and hotels are available. The sports center contains outdoor and indoor swimming pools, indoor tennis courts, large-sport-resounds, a football stadium, a landing area for aircraft, recreation sites and hiking trails

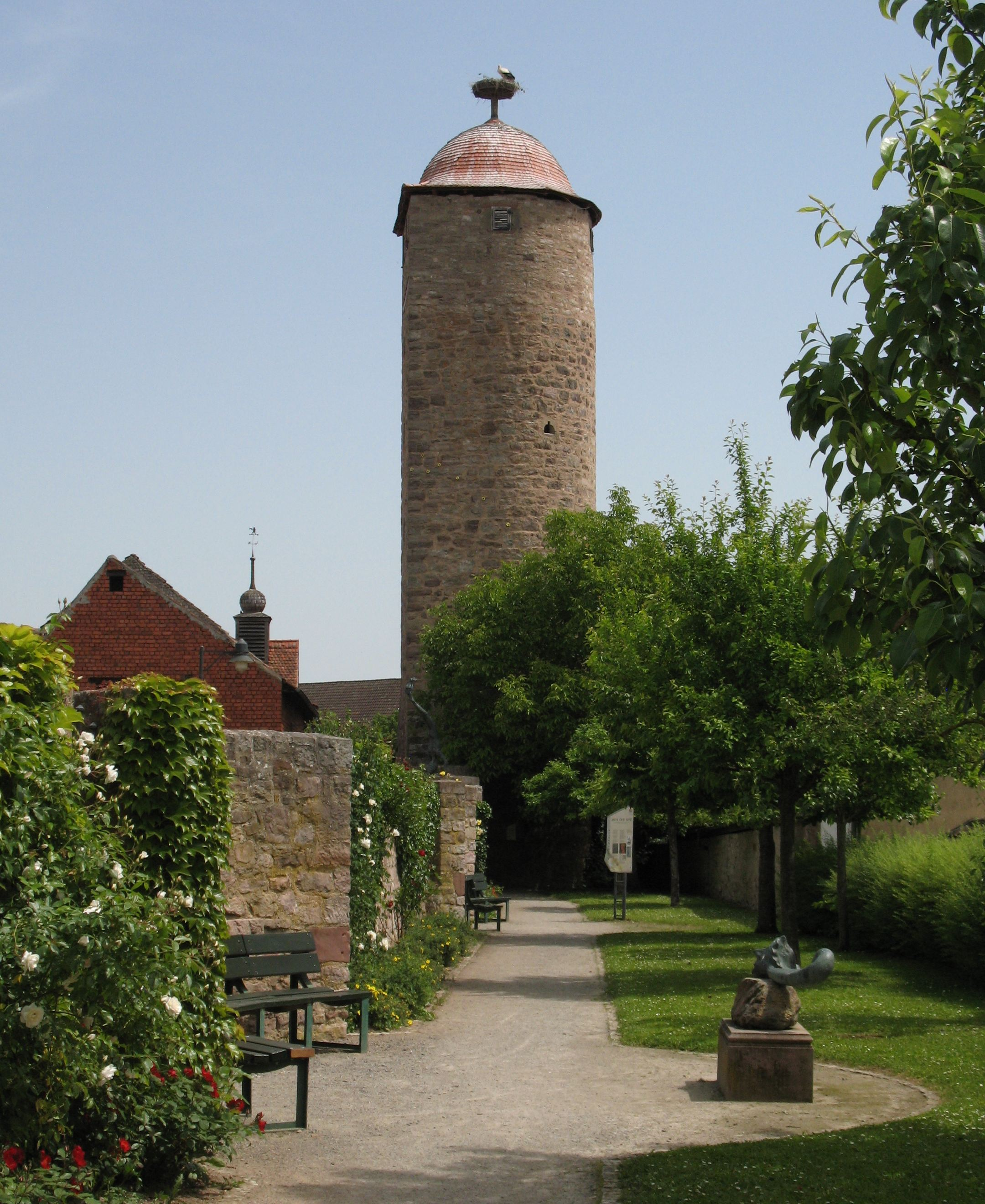
City walls

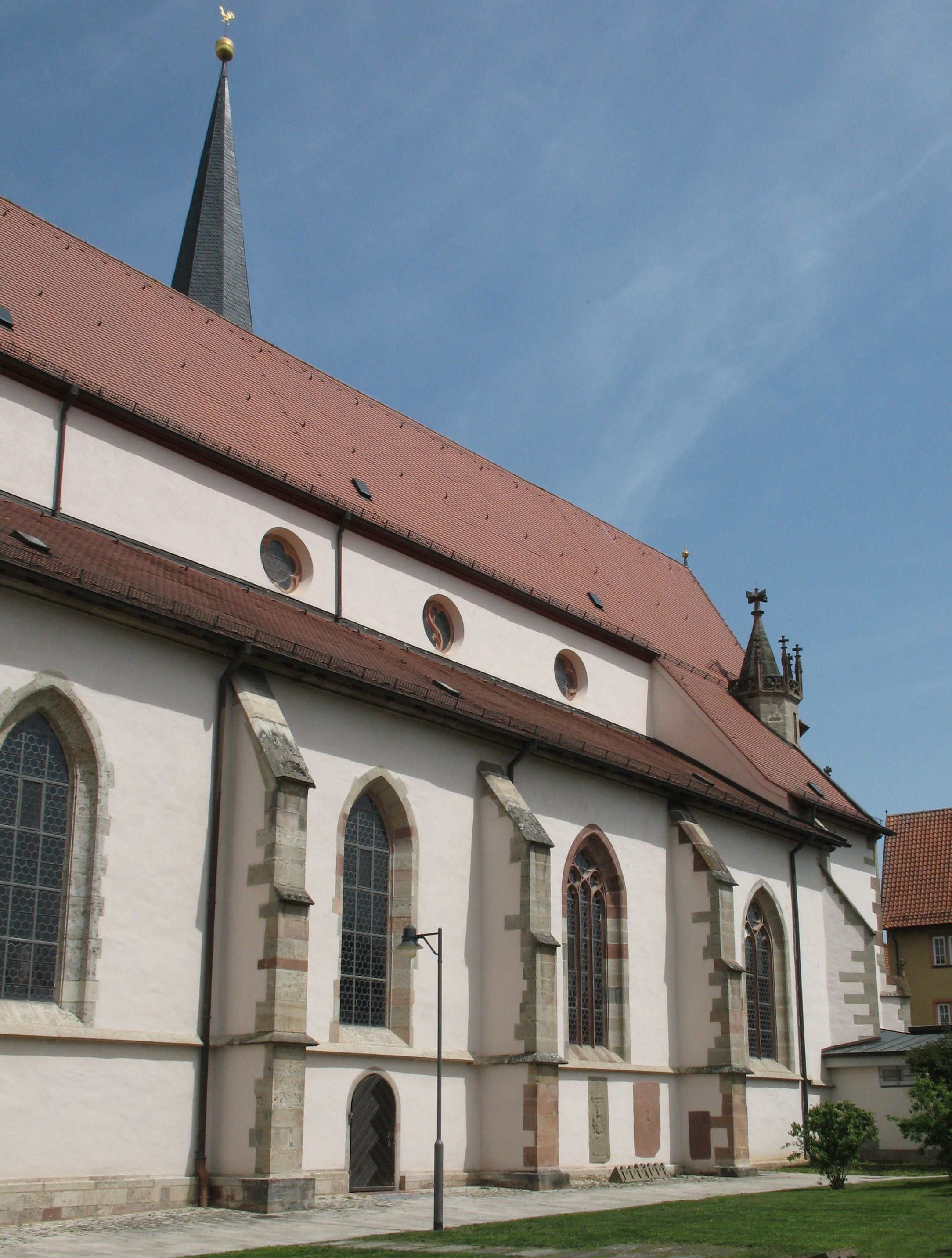
St John the Baptist's Church

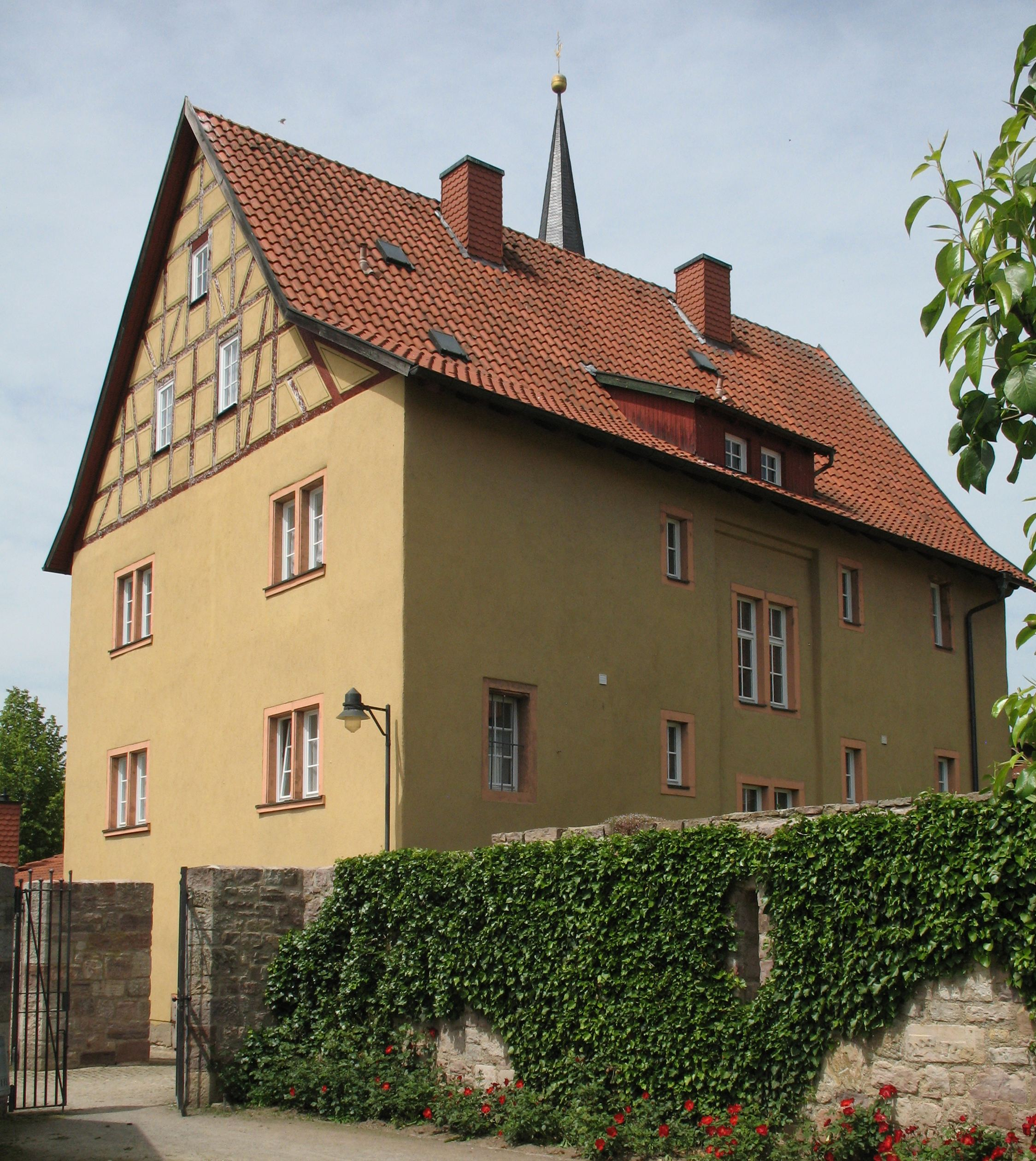
Rectory

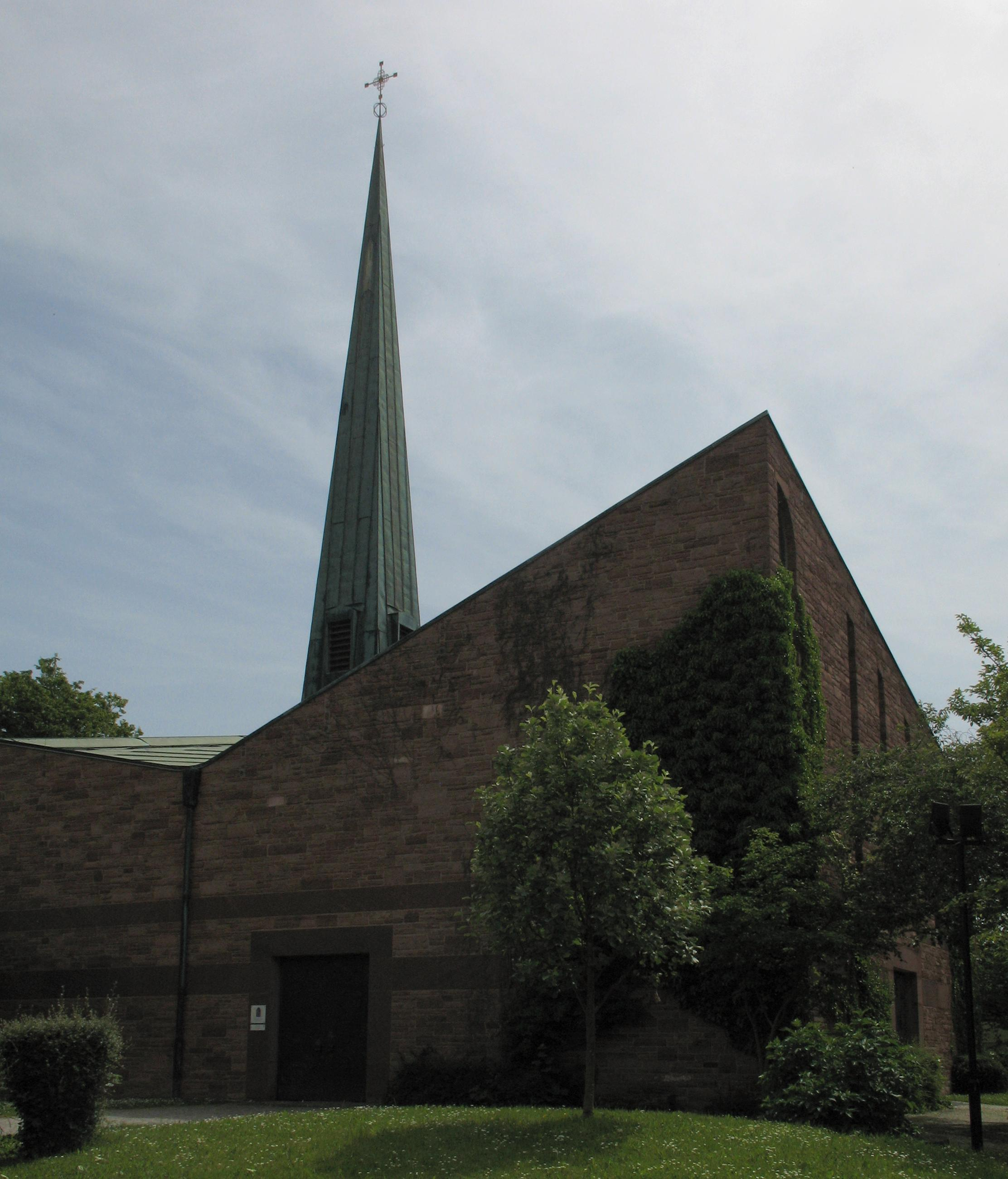
St Michael's church

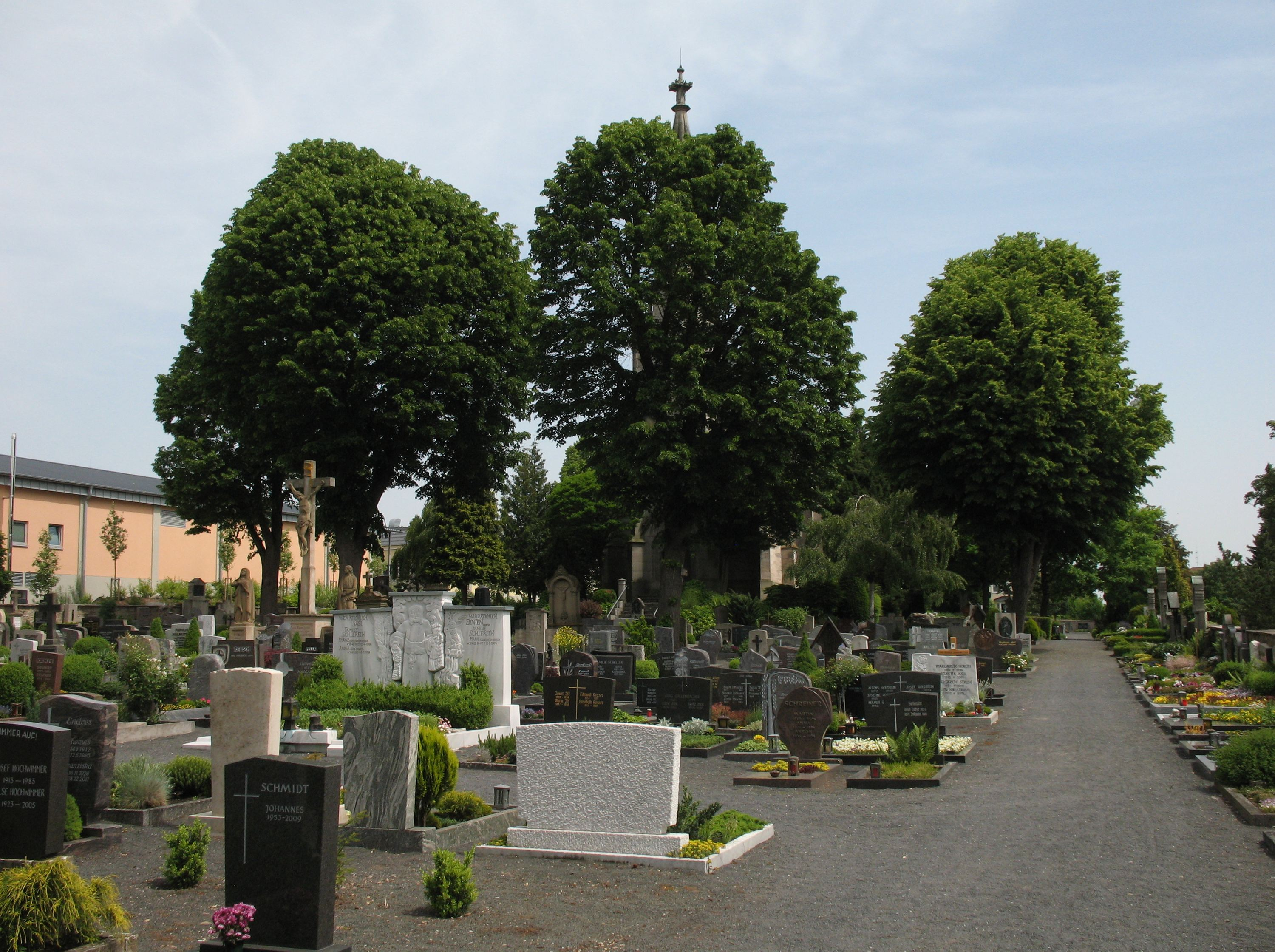
Cemetery

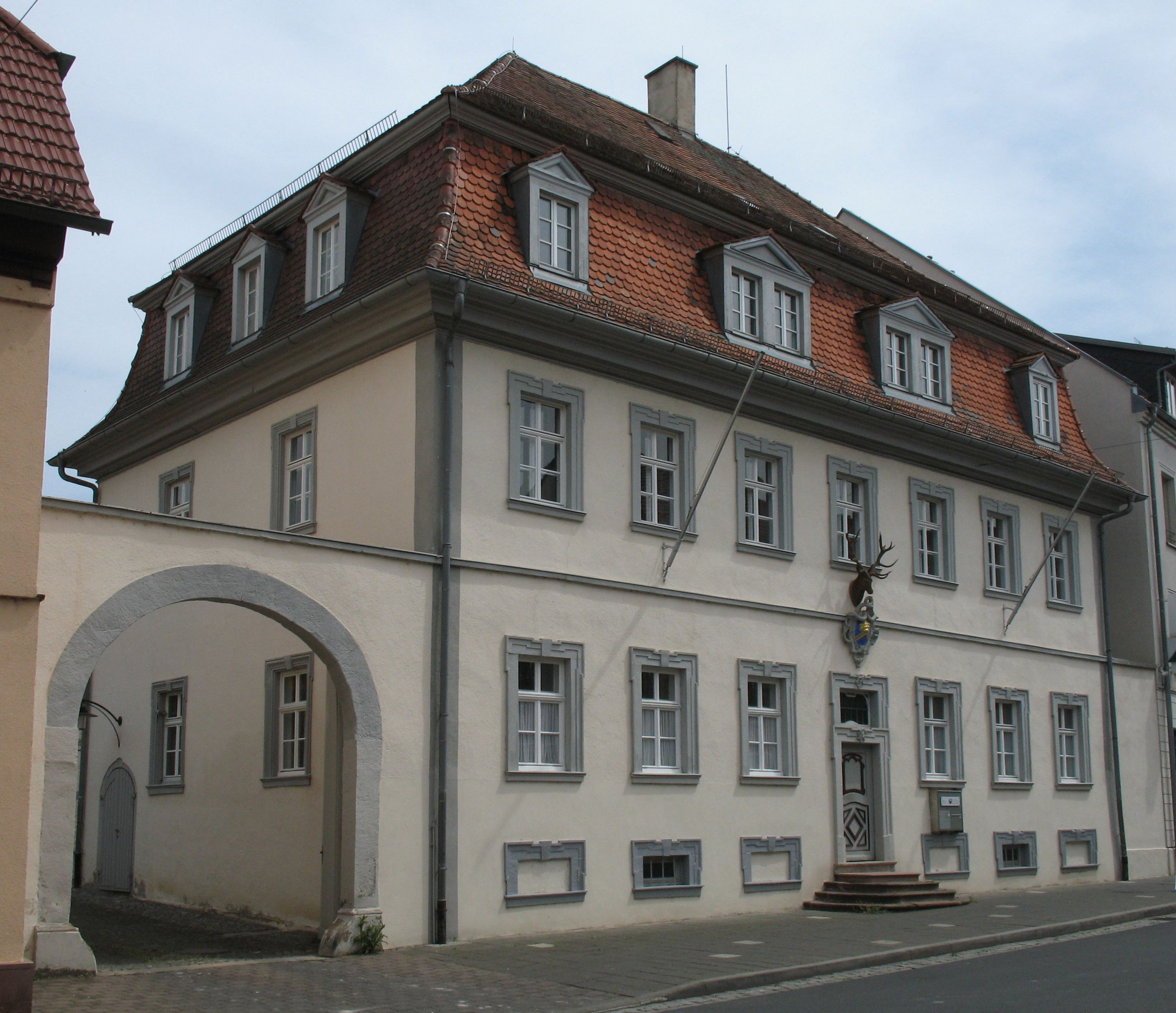
Listed building
