= John George II of Saxe-Eisenach =

John George II
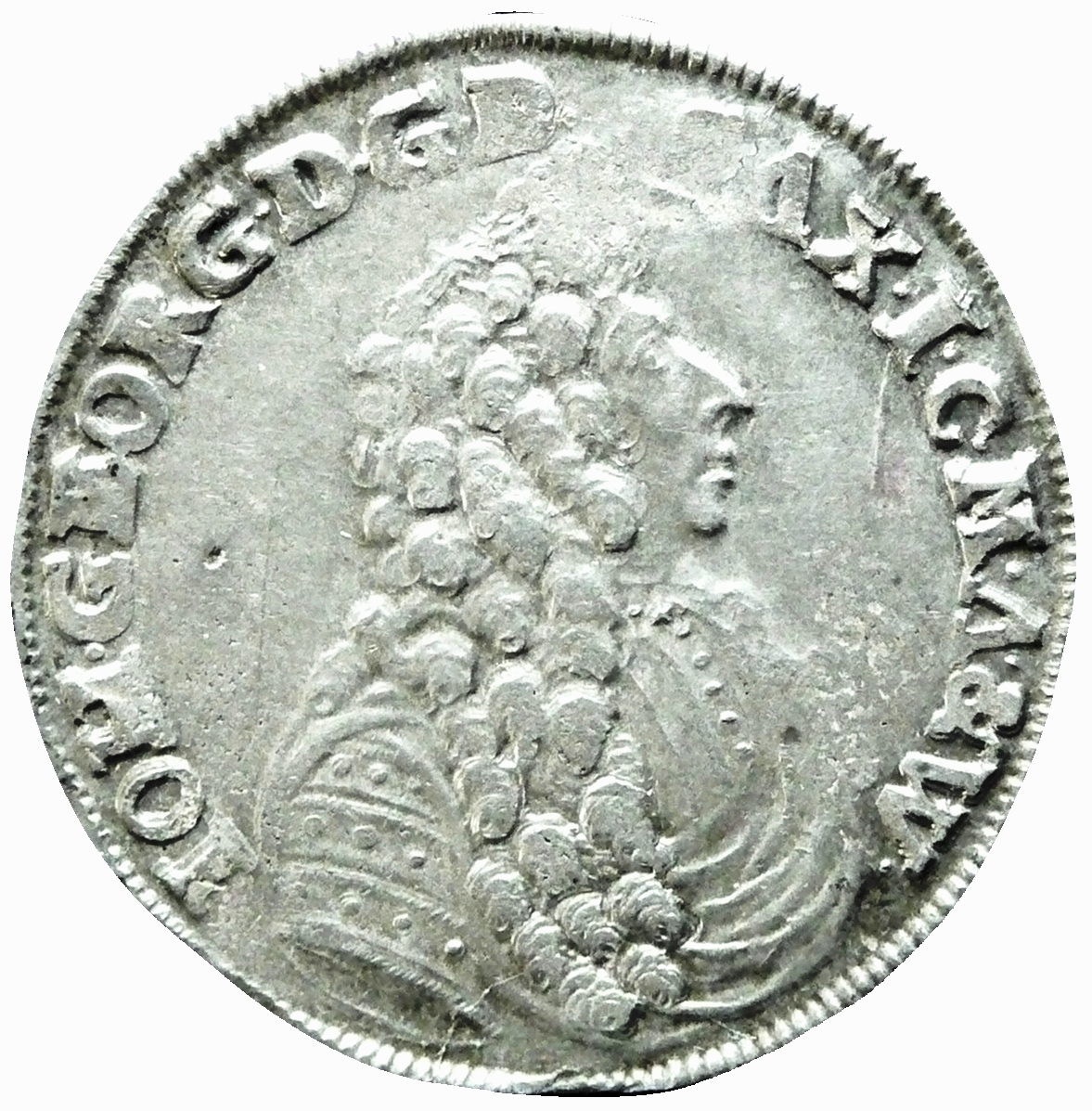

Duke of Saxe-Eisenach
- Reign: 1686–1698
- Predecessor: John George I
- Successor: John William III
- Born: 24 July 1665; Friedewald
- Died: 10 November 1698 (aged 33); Eisenach
- Spouse: Sophie Charlotte of Württemberg (m. 1688)
- House: House of Wettin
- Father: Johann Georg I, Duke of Saxe-Eisenach
- Mother: Johannetta of Sayn-Wittgenstein
- Religion: Lutheran

Johann Georg II, Duke of Saxe-Eisenach (24 July 1665 – 10 November 1698), ruled as duke of Saxe-Eisenach from 1686 to 1698.

Born in Friedewald, he was the second son of Johann Georg I, Duke of Saxe-Eisenach and Johannetta of Sayn-Wittgenstein.

The death of his older brother, Frederick August, who was killed in battle in 1684, made him the new heir of the duchy of Saxe-Eisenach. Two years later (1686), Johann Georg succeeded his father when he died.

In Kirchheim unter Teck on 20 September 1688 Johann Georg married with Sophie Charlotte of Württemberg. This union was childless.

When his cousin, the young Duke Johann Wilhelm of Saxe-Jena died (1690) Johann Georg inherited a part of his duchy, because he was compelled to make a divisionary treaty with the Duke Wilhelm Ernst of Saxe-Weimar, his other cousin and brother-in-law of the late duke.

Johann Georg died suddenly of smallpox in Eisenach, and was succeeded by his brother, Johann Wilhelm.

Preceded by Johann Georg I	Duke of Saxe-Eisenach; 1686–1698	Succeeded by Johann Wilhelm
